= Flags of British India =

India
- Flag of the Viceroy and Governor-General of India
- Proportion: 1∶2
- Adopted: 1869–1947
- Design: Union Jack with the Order of the Star of India in the centre, surmounted by the Tudor Crown.
- Indian Red Ensign
- Use: Civil ensign
- Proportion: 1∶2
- Adopted: 1880–1947
- Design: Red Ensign with the Union Jack occupying one quarter of the field placed in the canton and defaced with the Order of the Star of India.
- Ensign of the Royal Indian Marine, and jack of the Royal Indian Navy
- Use: State and naval ensign
- Proportion: 1∶2
- Adopted: 1876–1947
- Design: Blue Ensign with the Union Jack occupying one quarter of the field placed in the canton and defaced with the Order of the Star of India.

The flags of British India and the British Raj were varied, and the British Empire used several different banners during its rule on the Indian subcontinent. Flags with the Star of India emblem in their design are often referred to as the Star of India flag, and were used to represent India itself and high offices in the government of India. The Viceroy's Union Flag banner, featuring the star emblem, was officially considered the "Flag of India," and the Red Ensign bearing the star was also used as an Indian flag, particularly at international events. The Royal Indian Navy also flew a blue jack flag bearing the Star of India. The East India Company, which ruled India prior to 1858, used a flag featuring the Union Jack with red and white stripes.

During the British Raj, the Union Jack of the United Kingdom was regarded as the "national flag," and in 1913 the imperial government issued a decision that, as the national banner, it could be flown "by any private individual or firm." However, per a 1936 decision, "private bodies and individuals" were not permitted to fly the Viceroy's Star of India banner.

India had a range of flags for different purposes. The Princely states had their own flags which were to be flown alongside the British flag as a symbol of suzerainty. The civil ensign and naval ensign were the Red Ensign or Blue Ensign, respectively, defaced with the Star of India emblem. The Union Jack and the Viceroy's banner were lowered with independence and the adoption of the new national flag in August 1947, although the Union Jack was still to be flown, on a limited basis, while India remained a dominion.

== History ==
Ideas for a flag for areas under British India were initially imperial ones, rather than nationalist ones. After the Indian Rebellion of 1857 and the later establishment of the British Indian Empire, a representative symbol of the new government was pending. Various designs were proposed for the first Star of India flag in 1863, keeping similar flag designs adopted in other British colonies such as Canada and Australia, combining symbols of Imperial authority such as the Union Jack and the royal crown with symbols specific to the colony in question.

=== Company flag ===
Flag of the East India Company from 1600 to 1707.

Flag of the East India Company from 1707 to 1801.

Flag of the East India Company from 1801 to 1858.

Upon receiving Royal Assent to trade in the Indian Ocean by Queen Elizabeth I in 1600, the English East India Company adopted a flag of thirteen red and white stripes with the flag of England in canton. The flag in the canton eventually changed to the flag of Great Britain in 1707 and later to the Union Jack in 1801. These flags were also used during the Company rule in India.

After the Indian Rebellion of 1857, the British government passed the Government of India Act 1858, nationalising the East India Company and taking over all of their possessions within India, where they would be considered legally a part of the British Indian Empire. The striped banner of the Company was thus replaced by the Union Jack.

== Flags ==
=== Blue Ensign ===
Ensign of the Royal Indian Marine (later called the Royal Indian Navy).

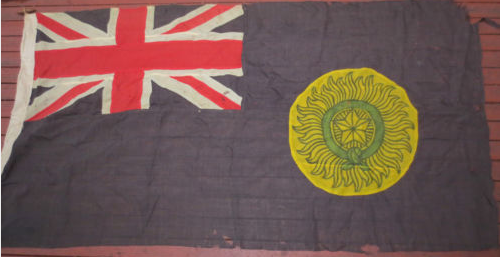
Photograph of the Blue Ensign, used as the naval jack of the Royal Indian Navy

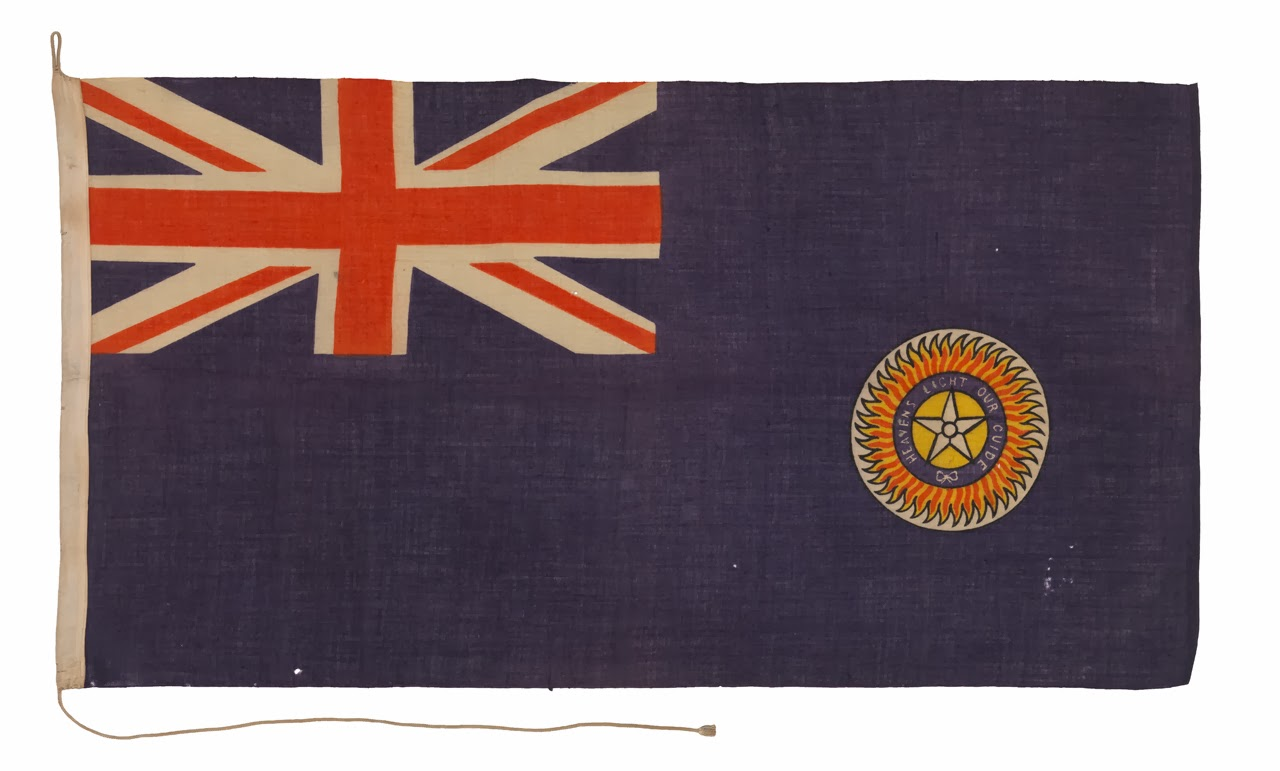
Blue ensign

After Queen Victoria became Empress of India through the proclamation of 1876, a naval ensign with the symbol of the Order of the Star of India was warranted by the Admiralty to the Indian Marine in 1877. It was used on vessels of Her Majesty's Indian Marine (Later called the Royal Indian Navy) and for other military and naval purposes.

Its usage was altered from 1928, when the Royal Indian Navy switched to White Ensign as naval ensign, and the Blue Ensign became the naval jack.

=== Red Ensign ===
Civil ensign of British India, which was also sometimes used to represent India internationally.

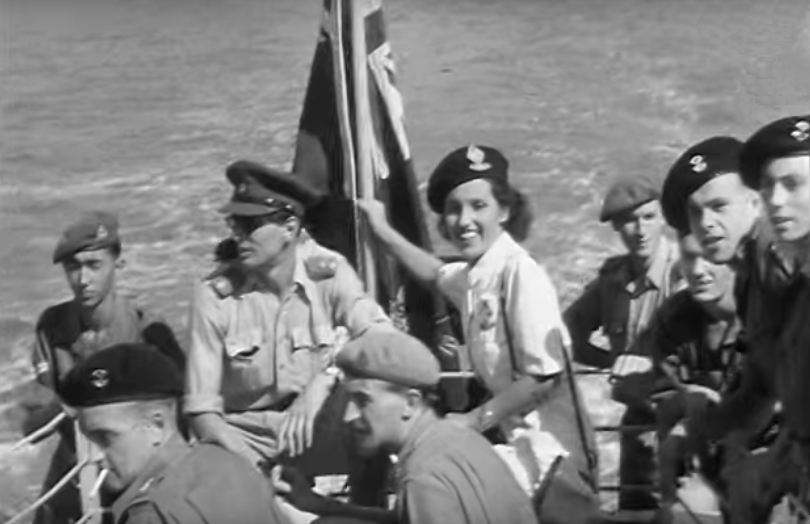
A Somerset Light Infantry Regiment member hoists the Civil Ensign

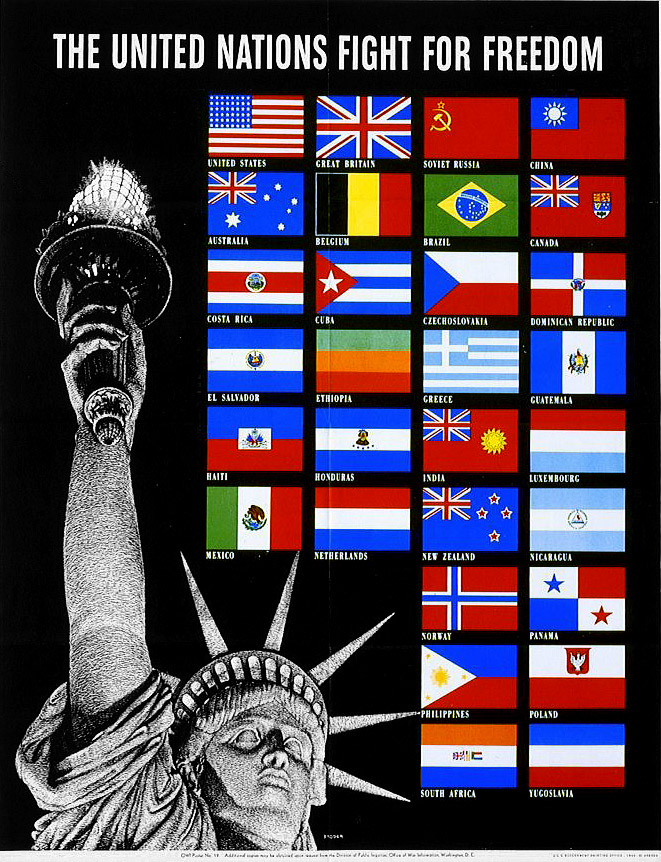
The Red Ensign used to represent India as a member of the Allies in World War II, showing the original United Nations in 1942

While the Blue Ensign was used for military and naval purposes, the Red Ensign was used as the civil ensign and sometimes represented India in international events, notably in the Declaration by United Nations during World War II. The ensign used on merchant ships registered in British Indian ports was the undefaced red ensign.

=== Flag of the Viceroy and Governor-General ===
Flag of the Viceroy and Governor-General of India.

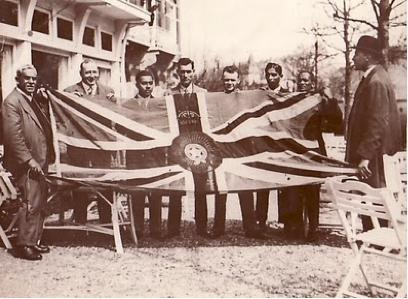
Indian hockey players arrive in the Netherlands for the 1928 Summer Olympics

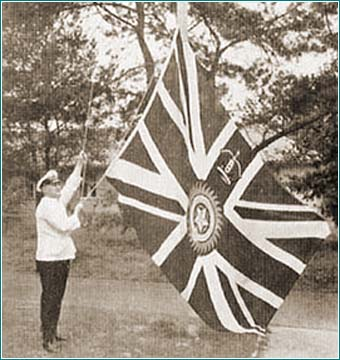
Flag of the Viceroy of India being used to represent India at the 1936 Summer Olympics

From around 1885, the viceroy of India was allowed to fly a Union Flag augmented in the centre with the 'Star of India' surmounted by a Crown. It was often used to represent India, acting as an "unofficial national flag", in international events etc. This flag was not the Viceroy's personal flag; it was also used by governors, lieutenant governors, chief commissioners and other British officers in India. When at sea, only the viceroy flew the flag from the mainmast, while other officials flew it from the foremast.

==== As Independent Dominions ====
Flag of the Governor-General of the Dominion of India (1947–1950).

Flag of the Governor-General of the Dominion of Pakistan (1947–1953) depicted with Tudor Crown.

Flag of the Governor-General of the Dominion of Pakistan (1953–1956) depicted with St. Edward's Crown.

The Star of India series of flags were discontinued from 1947, when the newly independent Dominions of India and Pakistan were established by the Indian Independence Act 1947. The newly formed offices of the governor-generals of India and Pakistan used a dark blue flag bearing the royal crest (a lion standing on the Tudor Crown), beneath which were the words 'INDIA' and 'PAKISTAN' in gold majuscules respectively.

These flags were ultimately discontinued when India and Pakistan when they abolished their Dominion status after becoming constitutional republics in 1950 and 1956 respectively.

=== Flags of the British Indian Army ===
Flag of the Royal Indian Army Service Corps

The Royal Indian Army Service Corps used a Blue Ensign design with the Star of India emblem in the fly; the design was added to the 1930 edition of the Admiralty Flag Book on 20 February 1945, as plate 22c.

=== Flag of Royal Indian Air Force ===
Royal Indian Air Force ensign

Roundel (1942–1945)

The Royal Indian Air Force used the roundel that of Royal Air Force augmented in centre of a star. The roundel is not superimposed on the same "Star of India" emblem seen on the Governor-General's flag or the jack flag of the Royal Indian Marine, but is a somewhat different design. The ensign had a field of air force blue with the United Kingdom's Union Flag in the canton and the Royal Indian Air Force roundel in the fly.

=== Proposed flags ===
Mountbatten's proposed flag for India

Mountbatten's proposed flag for Pakistan

Lord Mountbatten, the last Viceroy of India in 1947 proposed two separate flags for India and Pakistan to be used after Partition of India. The flag for India consisted of the flag of the Indian National Congress defaced with a Union Jack in the canton. It was rejected by Jawaharlal Nehru, as he felt that the more nationalist members of Congress would see the inclusion of the Union Jack on an Indian flag as pandering to the British. The flag for Pakistan consisted of the flag of the Muslim League defaced with a Union Jack in the canton. It was rejected by Muhammad Ali Jinnah, as he felt that a flag featuring a Christian cross alongside the Islamic crescent would be unacceptable to the Muslims of Pakistan.

=== Other flags ===
==== Flag of Home Rule ====
Home Rule flag variants

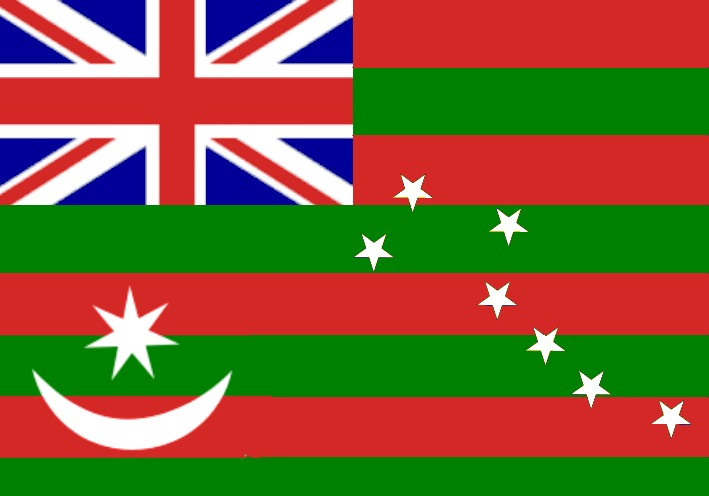

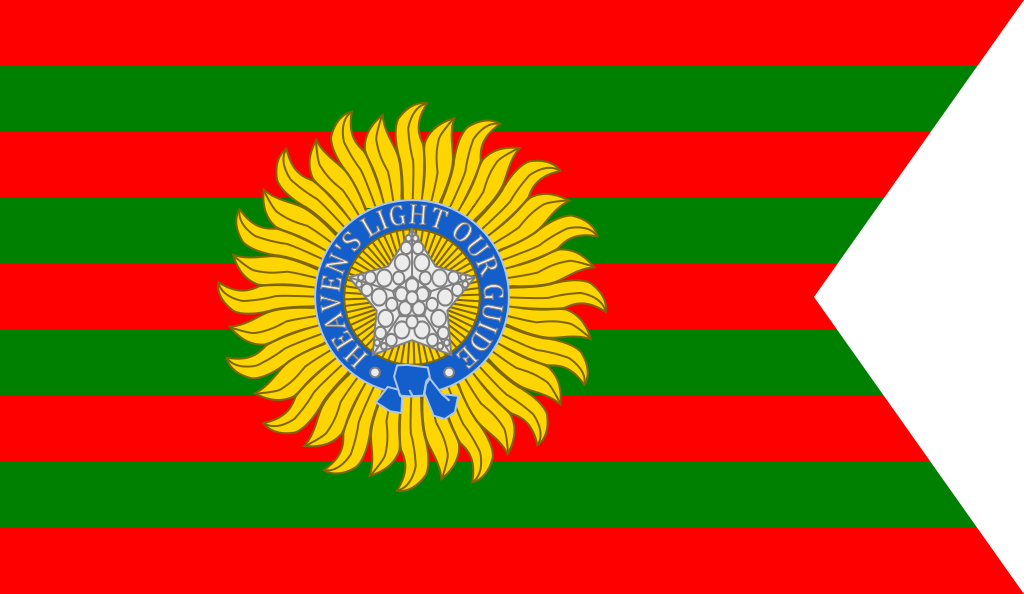

The Indian Home Rule movement used a five red and four green horizontal stripes flag. On the upper left quadrant was the Union Flag, which signified the Dominion status that the movement sought to achieve. A crescent and a seven-pointed star, both in white, are set in top fly. Seven white stars are arranged as in the Saptarishi constellation (the constellation Ursa Major), which is sacred to Hindus. (Note: In 1916, Suraiya Tayyabji submitted thirty new designs, in the form of a booklet funded by members of the High Court of Madras. These many proposals and recommendations did little more than keep the flag movement alive. The same year, Annie Besant and Bal Gangadhar Tilak adopted a new flag as part of the Home Rule Movement. The flag included the Union Jack in the upper left corner, a star and crescent in the upper right, and seven stars displayed diagonally from the lower right, on a background of five red and four green alternating bands. The flag resulted in the first governmental initiative against any nationalistic flag, as a magistrate in Coimbatore banned its use. The ban was followed by a public debate on the function and importance of a national flag.)

==== Coronation Standard ====
Coronation Standard of the British Indian Empire

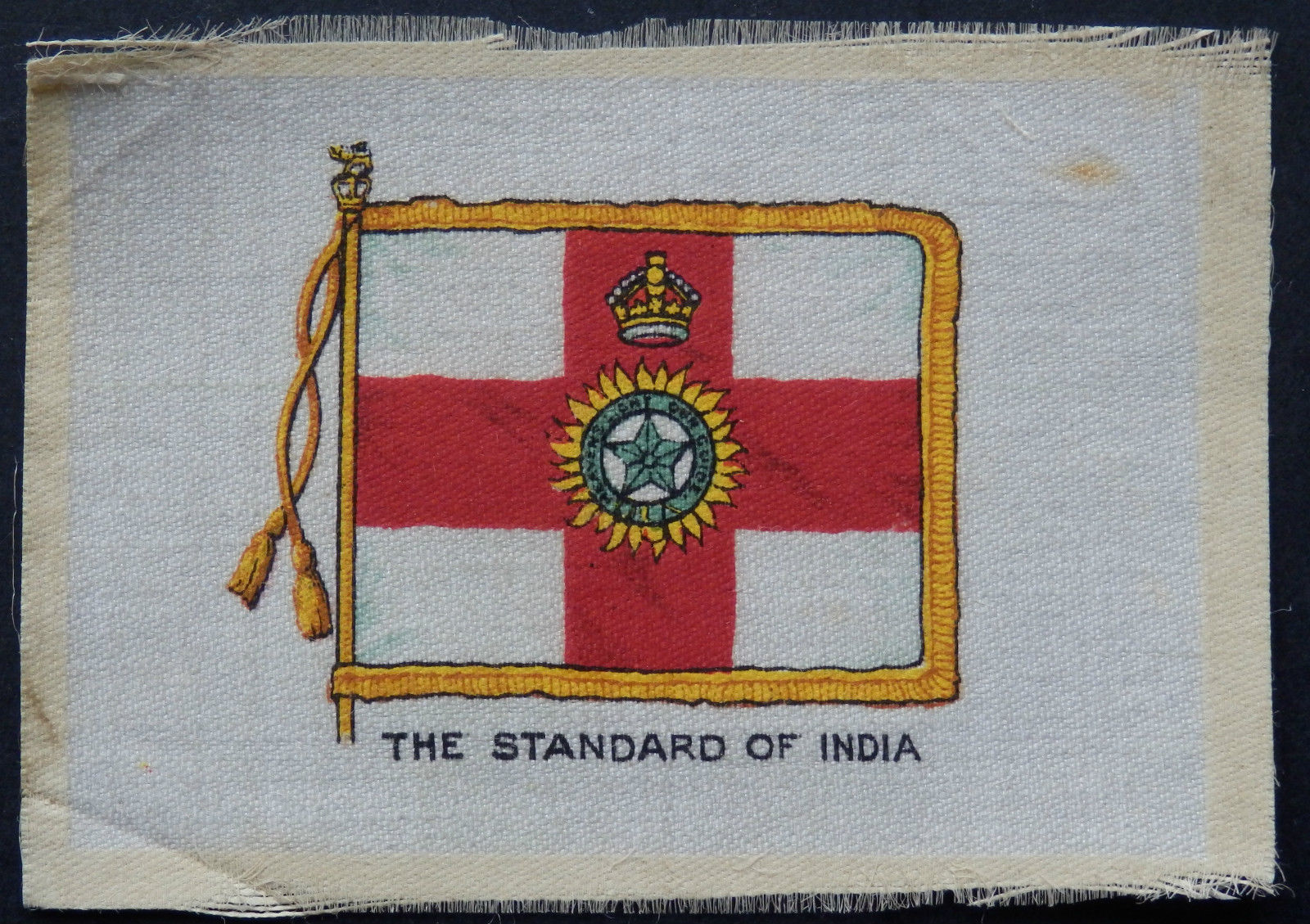
Anon Cigarette Silk (1915)

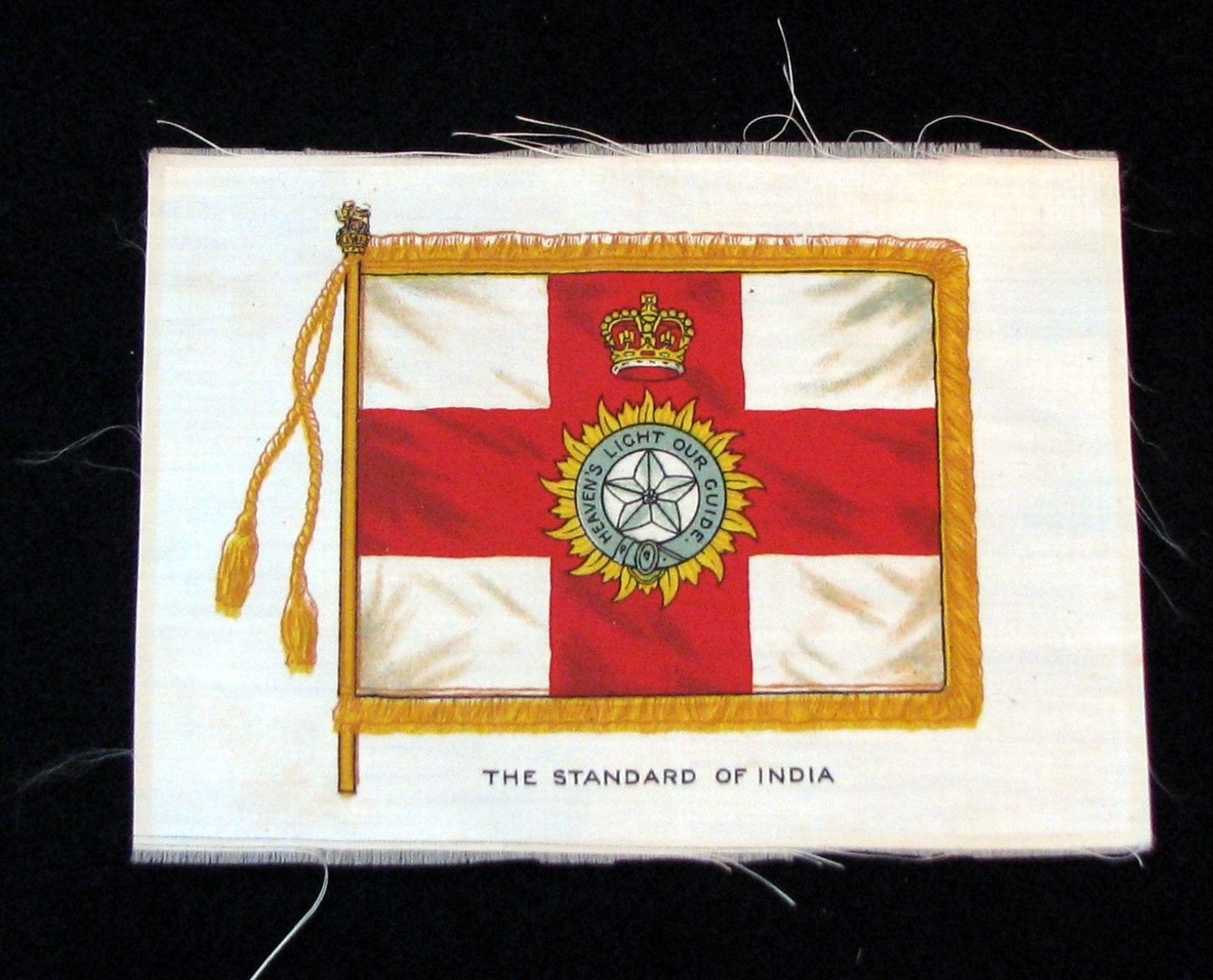
B.D.V. Cigarette Silk

The Coronation Standard of the British Indian Empire had a Saint George's Cross augmented in the centre with the 'Star of India' surmounted by a Crown.

==== Flag of Provinces and Presidencies of British India ====
Province	Flag	Emblem
Bengal Presidency		
Bombay Presidency		
Madras Presidency		
United Provinces of Agra and Oudh		
Punjab Province		
Bihar and Orissa Province		
Central Provinces and Berar		
Delhi		
Assam Province		
Burma Province		
Baluchistan Province		
North-West Frontier Province		

==== Flag of Indian Local Maritime Government ====
Ensign

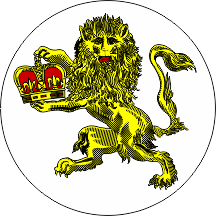
Emblem

The ensign of local naval vessels is a usual defaced blue ensign. The badge is a golden lion rampant guardant holding in front paws a crown. It was not a naval ensign, but the Indian equivalent of a colonial Blue Ensign as used on unarmed vessels.

==== Flag of Commissioners of the Port of Calcutta ====
Flag

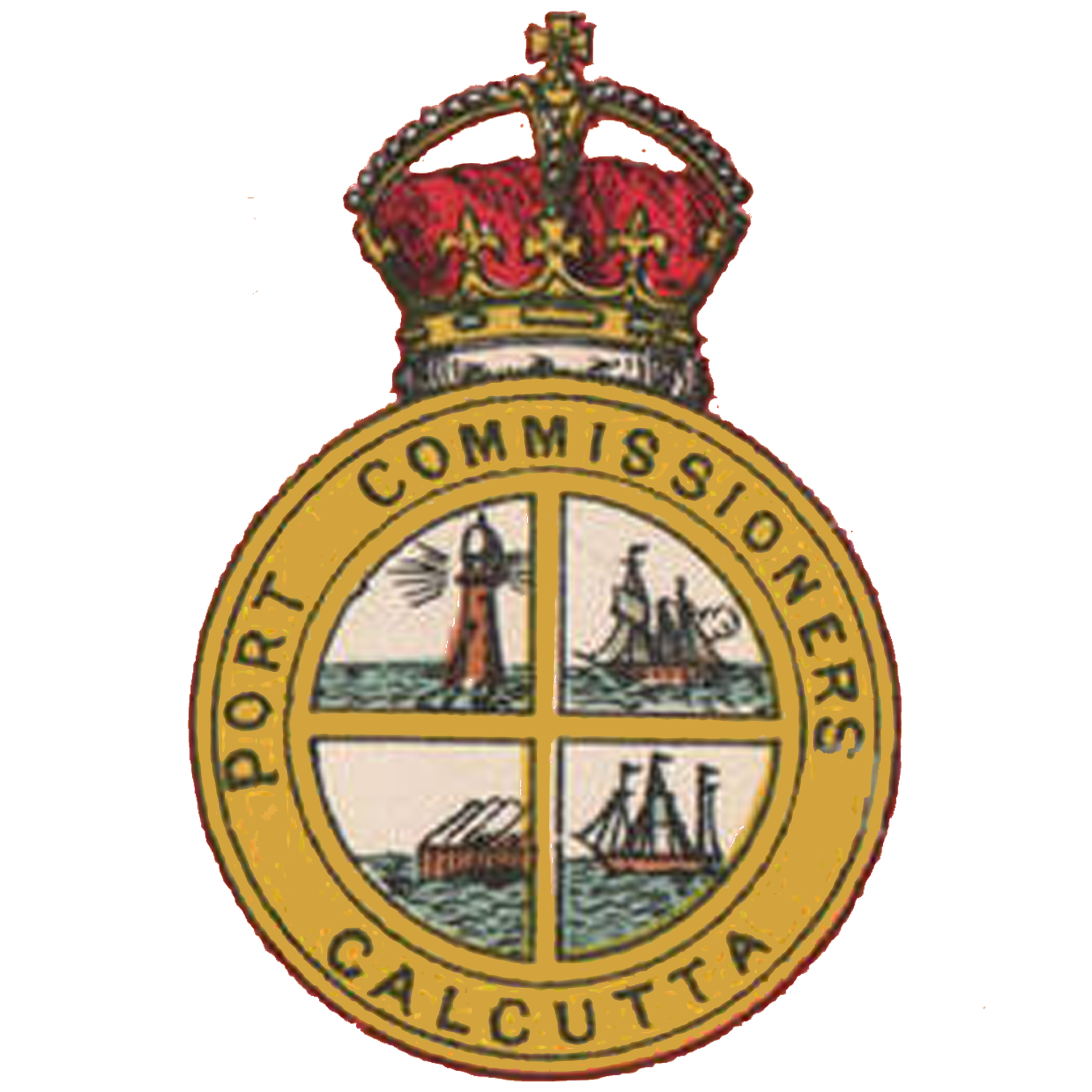
Emblem

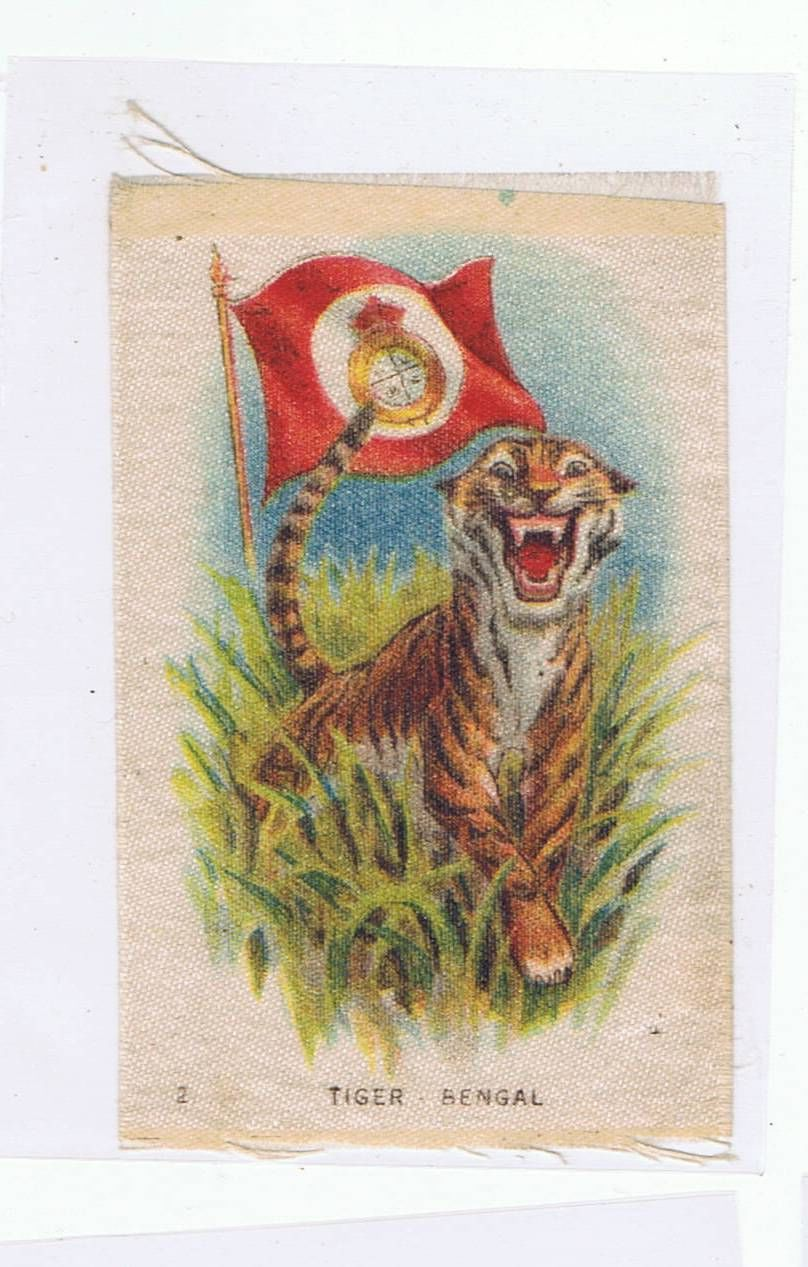
Imperial Tobacco Silk (1915)

On 1 February 1896 an Admiralty Warrant was issued for a Red Ensign defaced by the badge of the Commissioners of the Port of Calcutta as the flag of Commissioners of the Port of Calcutta

==== Flag of the Conservator of the Port of Bombay ====
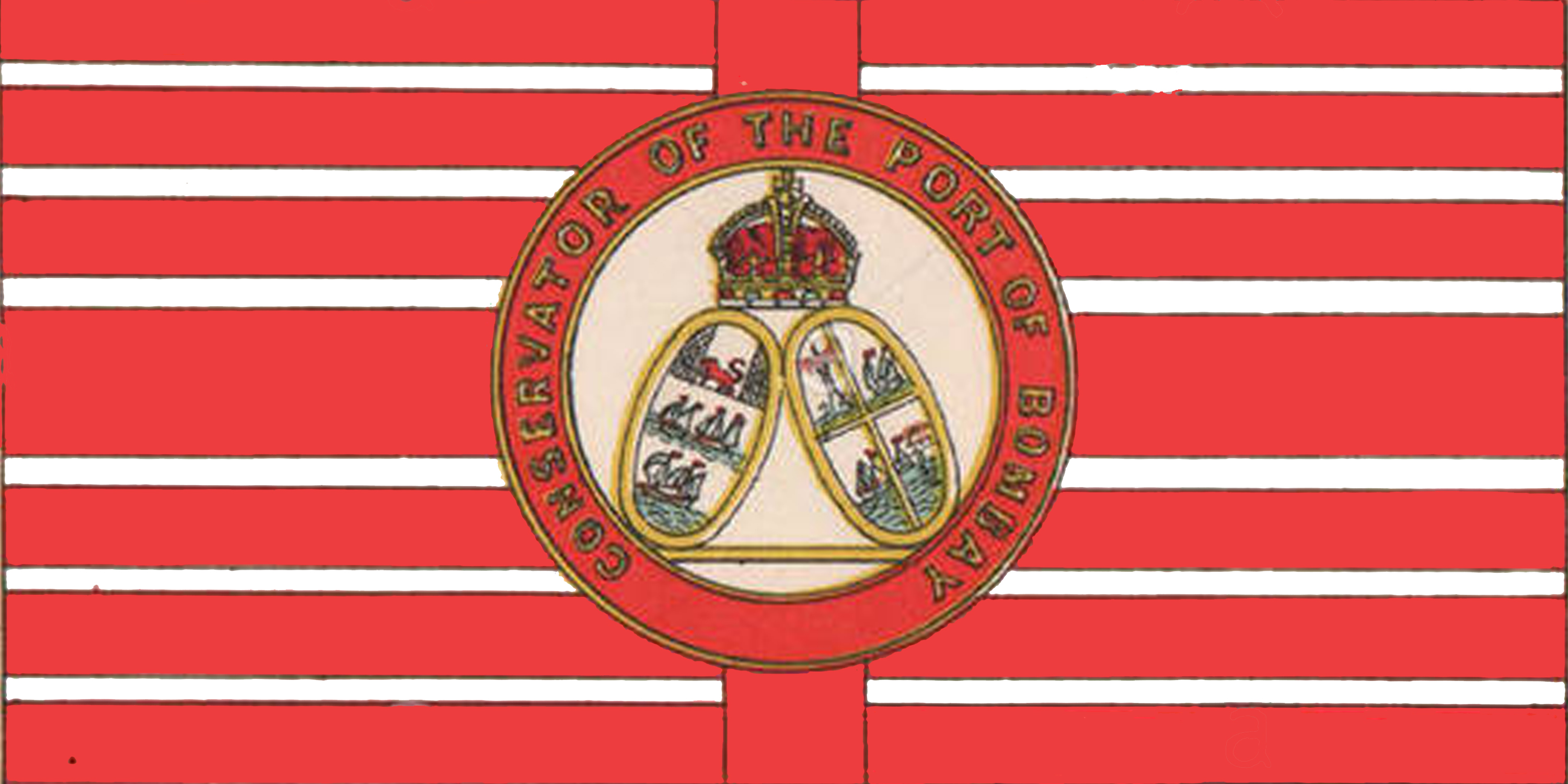
Flag

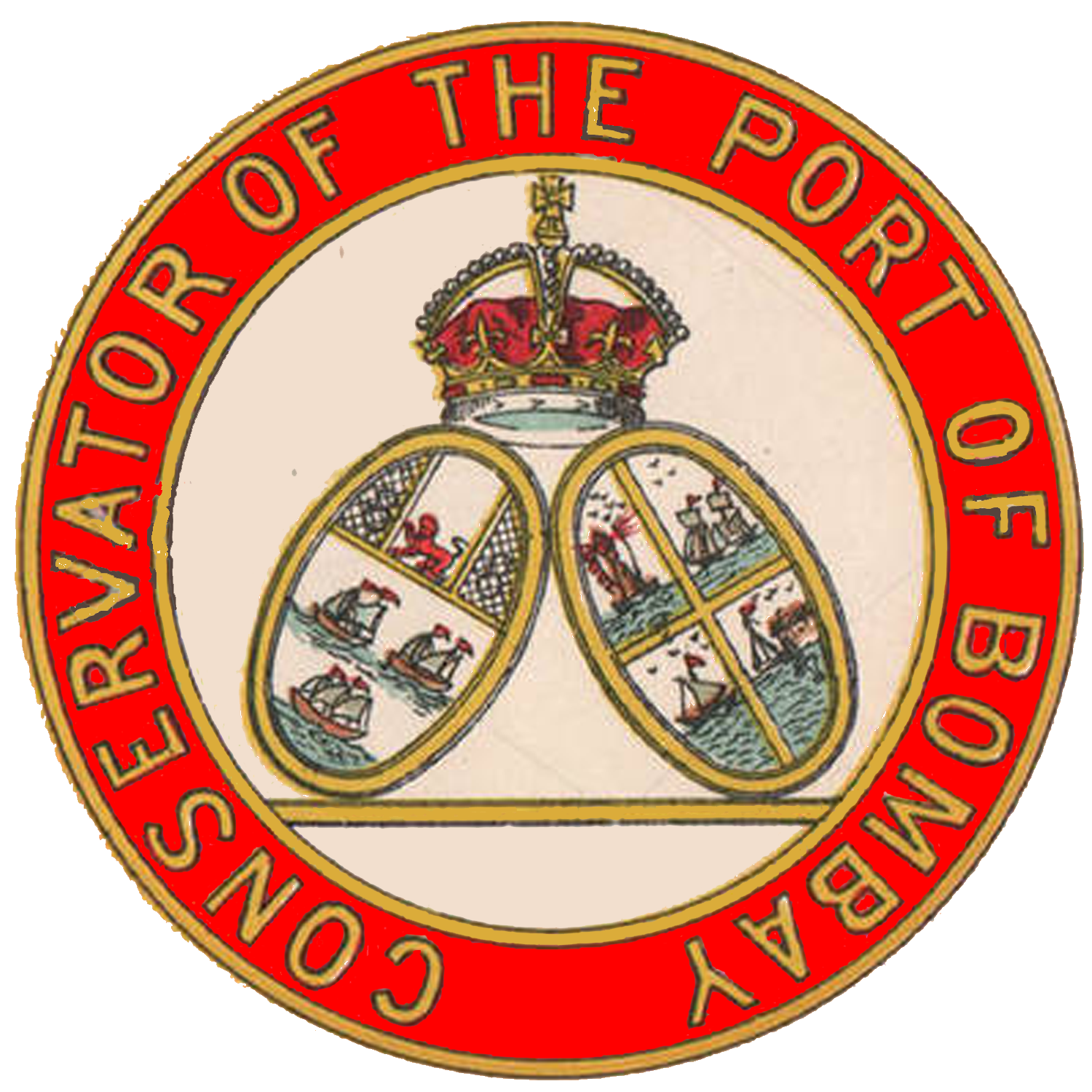
Emblem

An Admiralty Letter of 19 August 1880 authorised a special flag for the Conservator of the Port of Bombay. Red St George's cross on a white field with three narrower horizontal red stripes in each quarter and a large circular badge in centre. The flag was designed by Captain Sir Henry Morland, of the Royal Indian Marine.

The badge consisted of two oval shields, surmounted by a crown, within a red ring bearing the words Conservator of the Port of Bombay. The sinister shield has the four quarters of the flag of the Trustees without the blue St George's cross, while the dexter shield is from the 1877 arms of the City of Bombay; a red lion passant guardant, flanked on each side by an ostrich feather, (alluding to the visit of Edward VII when he was Prince of Wales), above three, three-masted dhows, known as pattimars. Bombay was the first city in the Empire, outside the British Isles, to which arms were granted.

==== Flag of the Trustees of the Port of Bombay ====
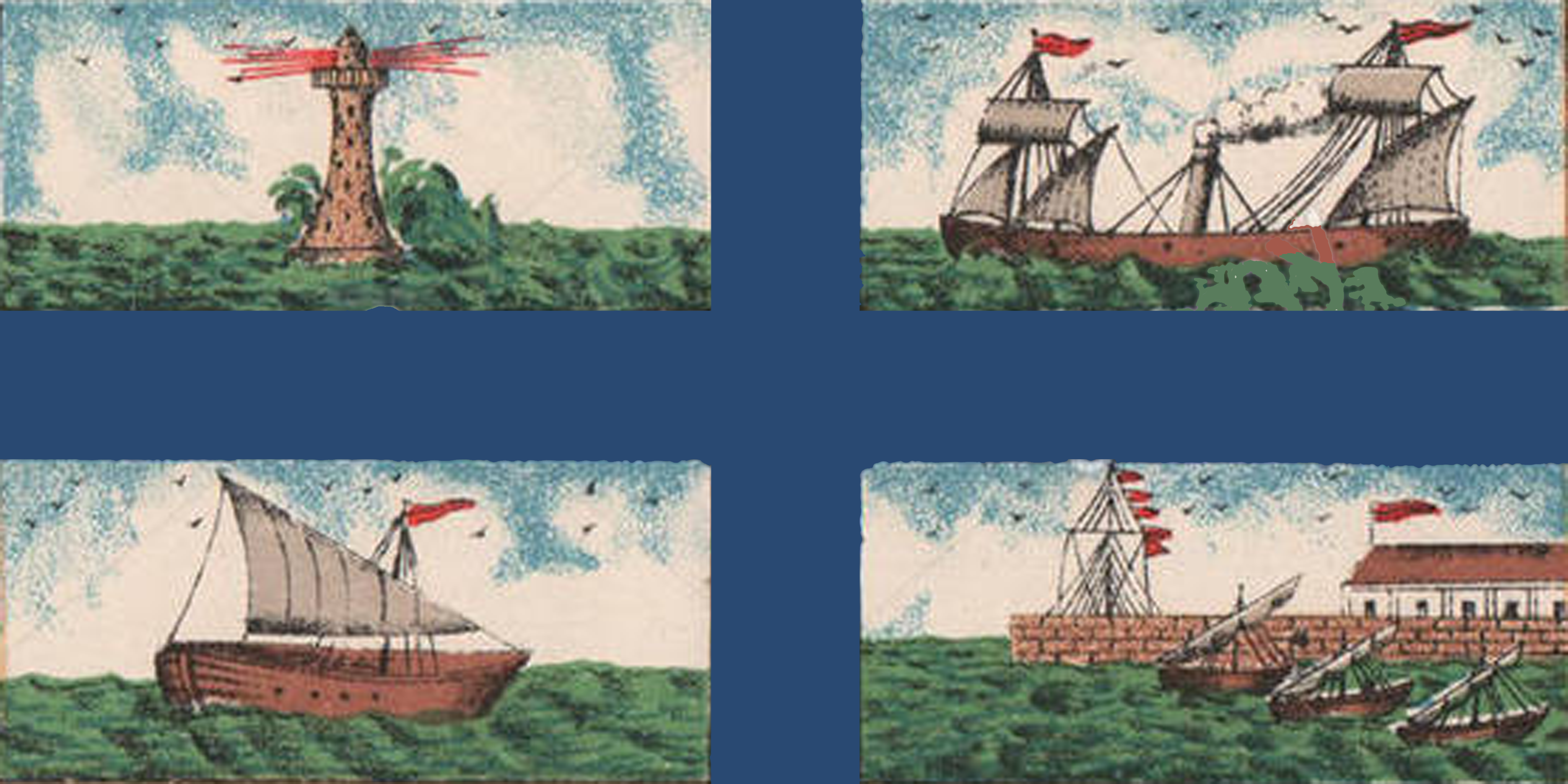
Flag of the Trustees of the Port of Bombay

An Admiralty Letter authorised a special flag for the Trustees of the Port of Bombay. Blue St George's cross with a maritime scene in each quarter; in the first quarter, a lighthouse, in the second a screw-steamer with auxiliary sails, in the third a dhow, and in the fourth a signal station at the end of a harbour wall.

==== Flag of State's Merchant ====
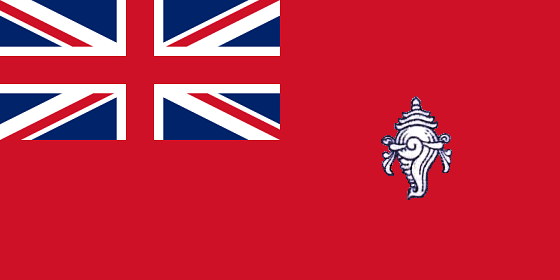
Flag of Travancore State Merchant

Flag of Porbandar State Merchant

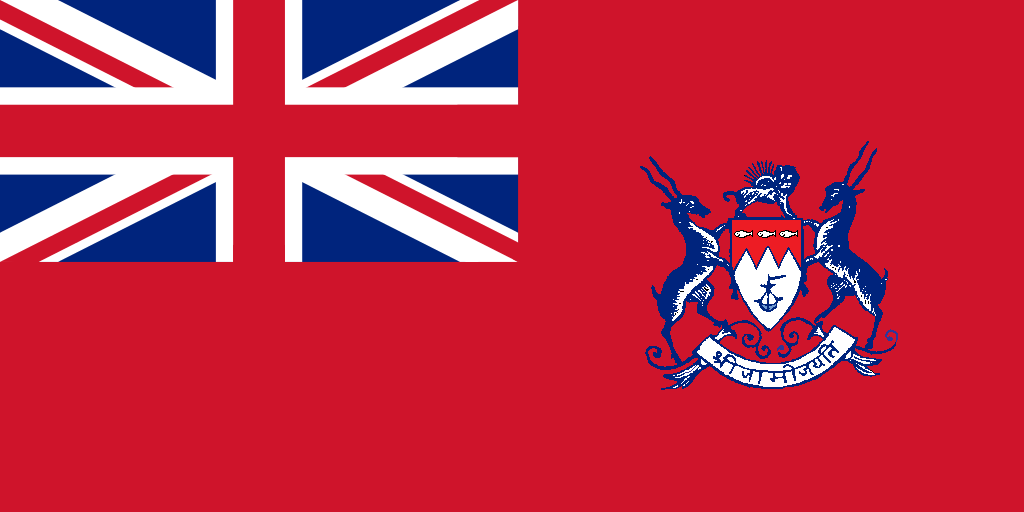
Flag of Nawanagar State Merchant

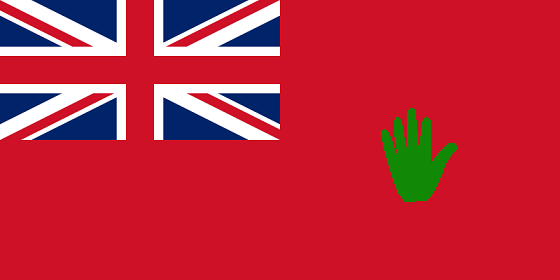
Flag of Sachin State Merchant

Flag of Janjira State Merchant

Flag of Jafarabad State Merchant

Flag of Junagadh State Merchant

Flag of Cutch State Merchant

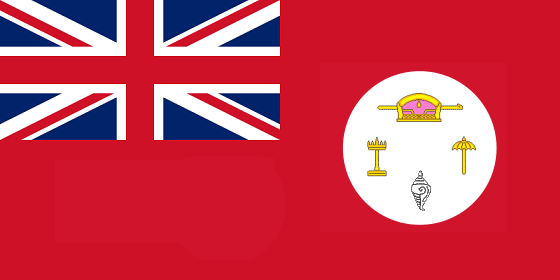
Flag of Cochin State Merchant

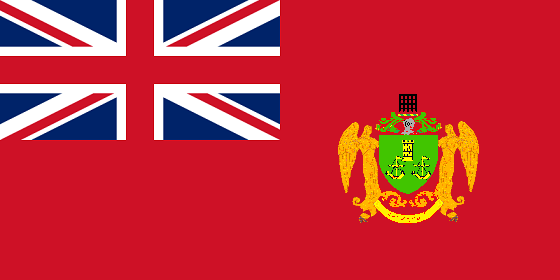
Flag of Cambay State Merchant

Flag of Bhavnagar State Merchant

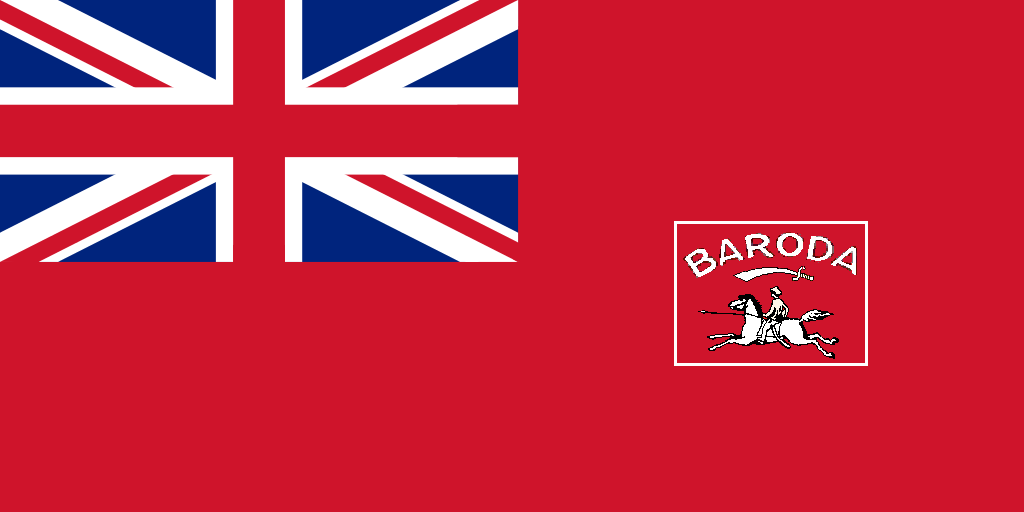
Flag of Baroda State Merchant

==== British Empire flag ====
The Indian variant of the flag design described by the Daily Express (1902)

Flag of the British Empire (1910–1921)

A surviving Empire flag from a Royal Museums Greenwich collection

There were some in the early 1900s who believed that the Union Jack was no longer representative enough to be the flag of the British Empire due to the emergence of new dominions, each of which were beginning to develop their own unique national identities. Attempts were made to create a new flag for the Empire as a whole.

Despite the failure to gain traction for an official Empire flag, an unofficial design with a strong similarity to the proposal originally described by the Daily Express in 1902 became popular among the public in the interwar period. This flag was a White Ensign featuring the symbols of the dominions. Canada was represented by the shield from its coat of arms in the bottom left. The coat of arms of South Africa was placed in the top right, and the coat of arms of Australia was in the bottom right. Four stars on the cross represented New Zealand, and the Star of India was placed in the centre.

== Emblem ==
Star of India
- Armiger: Emperor/Empress of India; Viceroy of India
- Adopted: 1861
- Motto: "Heaven's Light Our Guide"
- Order: Order of the Star of India
- Use: Emblem of the Indian Empire, alongside the Coat of Arms of the United Kingdom

Badge of the Viceroy of India (1876–1904) depicted with St. Edward's Crown

Badge of the Viceroy of India (1904–1947) depicted with Tudor Crown
Emblem used by the Royal Indian Army Service Corps

Star and Collar of a Knight Grand Commander of the Order of the Star of India

The Star of India was the symbol of the Order of the Star of India, a chivalric order of knighthood. It was a rayed five-pointed silver star, decorated with diamonds and surrounded by a sunburst having twenty-six large rays alternating with twenty-six small rays. In the centre of the sunburst was a light blue ribbon bearing the motto of the Order, Heaven's Light Our Guide. The motto chosen was neutral so as to appeal to people of different faiths due to the religious diversity of India, with Heaven also referring to the stars, and their light that sailors used to circumnavigate to India. Unlike most British symbols, the Star did not have Christian connotations, as they were deemed unacceptable to the Indian Princes.

== Legacy ==
The flags were replaced by the Tiraṅgā (Indian Tricolour) after Independence on 15 August 1947 in the independent Dominion of India, and by the Parcam-e Sitārah o-Hilāl (Flag of the Star and Crescent) in the independent Dominion of Pakistan, which used the star as the basis of its Coat of Arms.

The emblem was used as a basis for many emblems of British India and continues to be used in modern India. The emblem is still used as a basis for the logos of many organisations such as the Oriental Insurance Company, Board of Control for Cricket in India, Greater Mumbai Police etc.

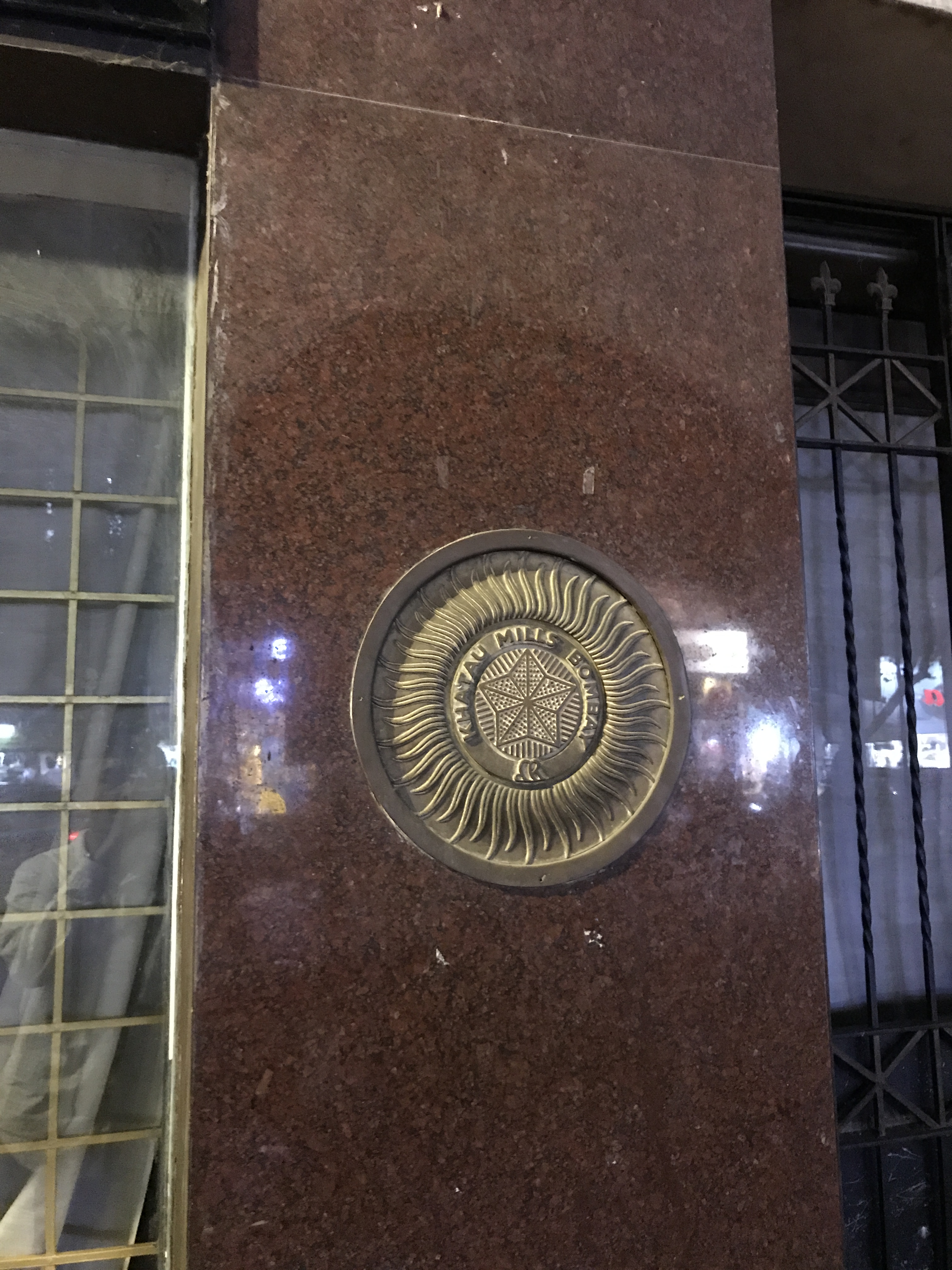
Insignia of Khatau Mills, Bombay.

== List of flags used in British India ==
Flag	Date	Description
	1733–1858	Flag of the Governors of the Presidency of Fort William (Bengal). Flag of the East India Company.
	1801–1947	Flag of the United Kingdom, the official flag of the British Empire.
	1869–1947	Flag of the Viceroy and Governor-General of India. Often used to represent India in international events etc.
	1880–1947	Civil ensign of British India, which was also sometimes used to represent India internationally.
	1876–1947	1876–1928 Naval ensign of the Indian Marine (later called the Royal Indian Marine); 1928–1947 Naval jack of the Royal Indian Marine (later called the Royal Indian Navy).
	1884–1928	Naval jack of the Royal Indian Marine (later called the Royal Indian Navy).
	1928–1950	Ensign of the Royal Indian Marine (later called the Royal Indian Navy). Same as the White Ensign of the Royal Navy.
	1942–1947	Flag of the Royal Indian Army Service Corps.
	1945–1947	Ensign of the Royal Indian Air Force.
