= Admiralty Peak =

Mountain in South Georgia

- Location within South Georgia Island

Highest point
- Elevation: 3,100 ft (940 m)
- Coordinates: 54°13′S 36°50′W

Geography
- Location: Location on South Georgia

Admiralty Peak (Spanish: Pico Almirantazgo) is a peak, 3,100 feet (945 m) high, lying east of Wilckens Peaks in the central part of South Georgia. Charted by Discovery Investigations in 1926–30 and named after the Board of Admiralty.
