= Admiralty Navy War Council =

Former war planning council of the British Royal Navy

Council overview
- Formed: 1909
- Dissolved: 1911
- Superseding Council: Admiralty War Staff
- Jurisdiction: Government of the United Kingdom
- Headquarters: Admiralty Building Whitehall London
- Parent department: Admiralty

The Admiralty Navy War Council was a temporary war planning and naval strategy advising committee of the Admiralty established in October, 1909 under Admiral Sir John Fisher it existed until 1911 when it was later replaced by the Admiralty War Staff.

== History ==
In May 1909, the Director of Naval Intelligence, Rear-Admiral Alexander Bethell, submitted a written report for the creation of a "Navy War Council" following the outcome of the Beresford Inquiry and recommendations that followed; it was to be made up of the following personnel: the First Sea Lord as president; the Director of Naval Intelligence acting as vice-president; an "Assistant Director for War"; the President, and the Captain of the Royal Naval War College; the Naval Assistant to the First Sea Lord. The head of the War Division of the Naval Intelligence Department's and the Commander of the Royal Naval War College acting as Joint Secretaries. Other Admiralty department heads could be summoned, to act as members of the council as and when their expertise was required. Its role acted as a precursor to the establishment of a professional naval staff function; it would initially devise on naval war plans, and also given an advisory role on naval strategy matters The council held a series of nine meetings between 13 October 1909 and 10 June 1911 before it was abolished and replaced by the Admiralty War Staff in January 1912.

== Council members ==
The Council had of four members, including

- First Sea Lord, and President of the War Council and Chief of Staff.
- Director of Naval Intelligence.
- Director of Naval Mobilisation.
- Secretary of the Navy War Council who was the Assistant Secretary to the Admiralty.

== Attribution ==
Primary source for this article is by *Harley, Simon and Lovell, Tony (2015).Navy War Council, dreadnoughtproject.org, Harley and Lovell.

== Sources ==
- Grimes, S. (2012). Probes into Admiralty War Planning, 1908–9. In Strategy and War Planning in the British Navy, 1887-1918, Boydell and Brewer, ISBN 9781843836988.
- Harley Simon, Lovell Tony, (2017), Navy War Council, dreadnoughtproject.org, http://www.dreadnoughtproject.org.
