= Department of the Permanent Secretary (Royal Navy) =

UK Civil Service department

Department overview
- Formed: 1702
- Dissolved: 1964
- Jurisdiction: Government of the United Kingdom
- Headquarters: Admiralty Building Whitehall London
- Department executives: Permanent Secretary to the Admiralty; Deputy Permanent Secretary to the Admiralty
- Parent Department: Admiralty

The Department of the Permanent Secretary also formally known as the Department of the Permanent Secretary to the Admiralty or the Department of the Secretary was the Civil Service department responsible for the control, direction and guidance of all administrative functions of the British Admiralty from 1702 to 1964, it was headed by the Permanent Secretary to the Admiralty.

== History ==
Prior 1869, the Admiralty Secretariat, charged with carrying special duties that were not usually dealt with by other departments, was also conduit from which departmental submissions would be submitted to the Lords Commissioners, when the commissioners had reached a decision this was usually communicated back to all relevant departments by correspondences that had been written by the secretariat staff which was then signed by the Secretary

As this was the system that was operating no important decision could be made without the knowledge and approval of the Secretary's department. All orders from the Board of Admiralty were conveyed through this system and this department effectively became a center for official admiralty knowledge.

In 1869 a number of changes were introduced in to modify this system then existing, mainly due to the complication caused by duplication of business and the resulting delays that it caused by a number of departments that were instructed to communicate directly to the board and always action the orders given by the offices of the various commissioners, without the approval of this secretariat.

Between 1879 and 1880 further re-structuring took place the formally known "Naval Department" was renamed the "Secretary's Department," following a report that was produced by the Massey Lopes Committee. The purpose of the formation of this committee was to investigate and conclude possible recommendations for restricting the secretariats role in relation to other departments, the word Naval was dropped as that implied military and replaced with civil terminology.

In 1932 following re-structuring with the Admiralty the Department of the Accountant-General of the Navy was abolished and some of its divisions responsible for finance were merged within the Secretary's department, the same year the Admiralty Records Office that had existed since 1802 was now part of this department. The department existed until 1964 when the post of "Permanent Secretary" was abolished and replaced by a new Navy Department and a Permanent Secretary to the Navy.

== Secretary's Department ==
The Permanent Secretary was initially assisted by a Chief Clerk then re-styled a Principal Clerk later re-designated an Assistant Secretary from 1911 (not a Deputy Secretary, which post didn't exist until after 1920), whose duties were defined in March, 1913, as: The Assistant Secretary acts for the Permanent Secretary in his absence and relieves him of such part of his ordinary duties as the Permanent Secretary may assign to him, the Permanent Secretary continuing to be responsible to the Board. He is responsible for the detailed supervision of the departmental organisation for war, and in this capacity is connected with the Admiralty War Staff, and attends and acts as Secretary at the periodical Staff Meetings. He exercises a general supervision over the Secretary's Department, under the direction of the Permanent Secretary. He also has general charge of office arrangements, including the allocation of accommodation and the superintendence of the Messenger Staff. After 1911 a number of Assistant Secretary's were created responsible for dealing with work in specialist area's such as Civil Administration, Finance, Materials and Estimates, Naval Personnel and Staff from 1920 onward they would report to the Deputy Secretary.

=== Senior support staff ===
Principal Clerks originally called Chief Clerks

- Thomas Wooley 1876–1880
- Edwin N. Swainson, 1880–1885
- Richard D. Awdry, 1885
- Henry J. Van Sittart Neale, 1896–1900
- C. Inigo Thomas, 1902–1907

Principal Assistant Secretaries

- Sir W. Graham Greene, 1907–1911

Assistant Secretaries

- Sir Oswyn A. R. Murray, 1911–1917
- Charles Walker, 1917–1918
- John W. S. Anderson, 1918–1920

Deputy Secretaries

- Charles Walker, 1931

=== Specialist duties support staff ===
A number of assistant secretaries specialising in certain area's were created they included:

Assistant Secretary for Finance Duties (F)

- Vincent W. Baddeley, 1911 – 1920.

Assistant Secretary Civil Administration (C)

- Robert R. Scott, 1917 – 1920.

Assistant Secretary Naval Personnel (N)

Assistant Secretary Material and Estimates (ME)

- Francis Dunnell, 1917 – 1919.

Assistant Secretary Staff (S)

- John W. S. Anderson, 1917 – 1918.
- Walter F. Nicholson, 1918 – 1920.

== Admiralty Secretariat ==
The Admiralty Secretariat was the organisation staffed by civilian members of the Admiralty initially charged initially with assisting the First Lord of the Admiralty, until the creation of the office of Secretary to the Admiralty and Second Secretary to the Admiralty in the execution of their responsibilities. The structure of secretariat was divided into various branches one responsible for each member of the Board of Admiralty. they included a Civil Branch (‘C Branch’) liaised with the Treasury on matters relating to finance, the Legal Branch or (‘L Branch’) to deal with Justice Department and Admiralty Court's system, the Military Branch or (‘M Branch’), liaises with First Sea Lord's, office dealt with the fleet; the Naval Branch or (‘N Branch’), liaises with Second Naval Lord's, dealt with personnel. The Ships Branch (‘s Branch’), liaises with the Surveyor of the Navy later Controller of the Navy dealt with procurement. The secretariat is conducted under the direct personal orders of the Board, and the branches were administered until 1907 by a Principal Clerk later called (Assistant Secretary's) except the Civil Branch, which is in charge of the Secretary himself. The Secretariat existed from as early as 1693 until the Admiralty department was abolished in 1964, however it continued under the new Ministry of Defence but the structure and responsibilities of the agency changed over time.

== Responsibilities ==
From 1693-1964

Responsibilities
Administer secretarial duties of Military Branch.
Administer secretarial duties of other Branches.
Administer secretarial duties of Admiralty and Navy Board, Admirals’ Journals and Ships’ Logs.
Administer Foreign Intelligence and Geographical Information.
Advise on the handling of all inter-departmental Admiralty business and precedents.
Conduct all other Admiralty secretarial work.
Co-ordinate Admiralty non-technical business.
Ensure the non-duplication of work of the Departments.
Ensure the non-duplication of work of the Naval Staff Divisions.
Process Captured Enemy Documents.
Process reports from Flag Officers.
Process correspondence from Officers.
Process correspondence from other Naval Boards.
Process correspondence from Naval Yards.
Process correspondence from Marine Establishments.
Process correspondence from other Naval Officials and Establishments.
Process correspondence other Officials and Departments.
Process correspondence, In-letters.
Process correspondence, Out-letters.
Process correspondence, General Correspondence.
Provide all common secretarial services.
Undertake all work that free's up the specialist duties of Naval Officers and Professional Admiralty civilian staff e.g. Scientists and Researchers.

== Record office ==
Charged with responsibility for collecting, filing and managing official Admiralty documents (1809-1964)

== Secretariat branches ==
The branches of the department were directly administered by the Secretary, whose duties consist of obtaining a practical knowledge into all Admiralty business, concerning whatever department it is; conduct and process all Admiralty administrative matters; signing all letters in the name of the Board, from which ever department it comes from; Monitor all Departments to ensure they do not act independently of each other.

=== Air branch ===
Role: The Secretariat served as intermediaries between Ministers and the Office of the Fifth Sea Lord and Chief of Naval Air Services
The Air branch or (A Branch), was added in 1938 and was responsible for examining and advising all matters in regard to Air Requirements.

=== Civil branch ===
Role: The Secretariat served as intermediaries between Ministers and the Office of the Permanent Secretary to the Admiralty
The civil branch or (C Branch) generally dealt with civil matters in regard to all appointments, promotions, retirements, pay, allowances, and leave of all salaried persons (including naval officers at the Admiralty) in Admiralty establishments, and of all persons on day pay, as well as with Civil Service examinations for these classes. The branch is further occupied in matters relating to civil appointments and fees at Greenwich Hospital, and civil superannuations and gratuities. Again, it deals with compensation to officers for wounds and injuries, with naval and Greenwich Hospital pensions, etc., to seamen and marines, with medals for long service, conspicuous gallantry, and meritorious service, with widows' pensions, compassionate allowances to children of naval and marine officers, and much else.

=== Legal branch ===
Role: The Secretariat served as intermediaries between Ministers and the Judicial Department
The Legal Branch or (L Branch) deals with questions of discipline, courts-martial, courts of inquiry and naval courts, desertions, discharges with disgrace, prisons and prisoners, punishment returns, etc. It also supervises the inspection returns of ships, and deals with matters concerning the slave trade, flags, colours, ensigns, and uniforms; and questions relating to the Queen's Regulations, and the legal aspect of blockades, prizes, etc., fall within its range. The Record Office, in which papers are stored upon an admirable system, is also attached to the Secretariat, in addition to the Registry and Copying Branches.

=== Military branch ===
Role: The Secretariat served as intermediaries between Ministers and the Office of the First Sea Lord
Military Branch or (M Branch) - having its most important duty in time of peace in regard to the commissioning, distribution, and paying off of ships, their complements and questions of leave - takes charge also of political correspondence, the suppression of piracy, and the protection of trade and fisheries, matters of quarantine, scientific exploration, signals and signal books, salutes, and much other like business. This branch is the secret and political office of the Admiralty, and is entrusted with the conduct of confidential affairs, and, in war time, would be generally the directing channel of operations, charged with questions relating to home and colonial defence, blockades, embargoes, prizes, and other matters incidental to hostile operations.

=== Naval branch ===
Role: The Secretariat served as intermediaries between Ministers and the Office of the Second Sea Lord

The Naval Branch or (N Branch) is largely occupied with the great work of officering and manning the fleet, and is therefore the main channel of the Second Sea Lord's operations. Here all general arrangements and regulations are made for the entry of men and boys, and the work of training ships, and the badges, promotion, and discharge of men. Again, the branch is concerned with all that relates to the education of officers, and to appointments, promotions, leave, retirements, removals, restorations, services, and claims of officers, good service and other pensions, and generally of honours, distinctions, decorations, medals, etc. The establishment and internal economy of the Corps of Royal Marines, and the general arrangements and regulations of the Coastguard and Reserves, are also within the scope of this branch, with other work relating to the personnel.

=== Ship Branch ===
Role: The Secretariat served as intermediaries between Ministers and the Office of the Third Sea Lord.
The Ship branch or (S Branch) that was previously under the domain of the Third Sea Lord was responsible for examining all Naval Shipbuilding Estimates. It also handled all correspondence in relation to the planning and procurement process and in matters concerning shipbuilding yards.

== Sources ==
- Primary source for this article is by Harley Simon, Lovell Tony, (2017), Permanent Secretary to the Board of Admiralty, dreadnoughtproject.org, http://www.dreadnoughtproject.org.
- Hamilton, Admiral Sir. Richard. Vesey, G.C.B. (1896). Naval Administration: The Constitution, Character, and Functions of the Board of Admiralty, and of the Civil Departments it Directs. London: George Bell and Sons.
- Hamilton, C. I. (2011). The Making of the Modern Admiralty: British Naval Policy-Making, 1805–1927. Cambridge University Press. ISBN 9781139496544.
- Haydn, Joseph; Ockerby, Horace (1890). The Book of Dignities; containing Lists of the Official Personages of the British Empire, Civil, Diplomatic,
- Logan, Karen Dale (1976). The Admiralty: Reforms and Re-organization, 1868–1892. Unpublished Ph.D. dissertation. University of Oxford.
- Precis of the Division & General Mode of Conducting the Business of the Admiralty at Whitehall." Dated 21 June 1844. The National Archives. ADM 1/5543.
- "Return "of the Distribution of Business under the Lords of the Admiralty under the Old and New Arrangement for conducting the business of the Department."" H.C. 84, 1869. Copies in Greene and Milne Papers. National Maritime Museum. GEE/2 and MLN/146/1.
- Rodger. N.A.M., (1979) The Admiralty (offices of state), T. Dalton, Lavenham, ISBN 978-0900963940.
- Smith, Gordon (2014), British Admiralty, Part 2 - Changes in Admiralty Departments 1913–1920, Naval-History.Net.
