= Admiralty Record Office =

British naval office responsible for Admiralty records

Agency overview
- Formed: 1809
- Dissolved: 1964
- Jurisdiction: Government of the United Kingdom
- Headquarters: Admiralty Building Whitehall London
- Parent department: Department of the Permanent Secretary

The Admiralty Record Office was a former office of the British Admiralty responsible for the collection, filing and management of all official Admiralty documents from 1809 until 1964.

== History ==
The record office was established in the Admiralty in 1809 to only manage the collections and to devise a central system of digesting and indexing. It existed until 1964 when the Admiralty Department was abolished and merged within a new Ministry of Defence.

== Responsibilities ==
Before the First World War the Admiralty was usually divided up for administrative reasons into branches, departments, divisions and sections, they were all individually responsible for the managing and maintaining their own records, each function were supposed to send all their finished documents to the record office for filing and preservation, this however did not happen due to constant organisational changes that were common place at the Admiralty. Those branches that were outside the remit of the Admiralty Secretariat did not always adhere correctly to internal procedures resulting in a loss of crucial documents.

== Example of the types of records kept ==
Now held at The National Archives included:

- ADM 1 (Admiralty correspondence 1660-1976)
- ADM 2 (Admiralty out-letters)
- ADM 3 (Admiralty minutes 1657-1881)
- ADM 4 (Admiralty: Letters Patent, Lord High Admiral and Lords of Admiralty Appointments 1707-1964)
- ADM 5 (Admiralty and predecessors: Letters Patent, Navy Board, Transport Board, Vice-Admiralty and Commissions of Inquiry Appointments 1746-1890)
- ADM 6 (Admiralty: Service Records, Registers, Returns and Certificates 1673-1960)
- ADM 7 (Admiralty miscellanea 1563-1956)
- ADM 8 (Admiralty: List Books 1673-1909)
- ADM 9 (Admiralty: Survey Returns of Officers' Services 1817-1848)
- ADM 10 (Admiralty: Officers' Services, Indexes and Miscellanea 1660-1933)
- ADM 11 (Admiralty: Officers' Service Records (Series I) 1741-1903)
- ADM 12 (Indexes and digests for 1793-1913)
- ADM 13 (Supplementary Admiralty records 1803-1917)
- ADM 116 (Admiralty Record Office cases 1852-1965)
- ADM 137 (records used to compile the official history of the First World War)

ADM records go up to ADM 363 plus one additional filed ADM 900.

== Historical researchers criticisms ==
The Record Office within the Admiralty consisted of very limited space, and as a result of those decisions, 98% of all routine, original and official papers were destroyed.

== Sources ==
- Archives. National ADM (1205–1998) Records of the Admiralty, Naval Forces, Royal Marines, Coastguard, and related bodies concerning all aspects of the organisation and operation of the Royal Navy and associated naval forces. http://discovery.nationalarchives.gov.uk/browse/Admiralty Records/ADM.
- Hamilton C. I. (2011) The Making of the Modern Admiralty: British Naval Policy-Making, 1805–1927, Cambridge Military Histories, Cambridge University Press, ISBN 978-1139496544
- Rodger. N.A.M., (1979) The Admiralty (offices of state), T. Dalton, Lavenham, ISBN 978-0900963940.
