= Wilckens Peaks =

Mountain in South Georgia

The Wilckens Peaks (54°12′S 36°57′W) are a group of mountain peaks, the highest 1,375 m, in the form of an arc which extends from the north side of Keilhau Glacier to the north side of Neumayer Glacier in South Georgia. The peaks were roughly located in 1928–29 by Ludwig Kohl-Larsen who gave the name "Wilckenskette" after Otto Wilckens of Bonn University. An English form of the name has been accepted.
