= Henry Morland =

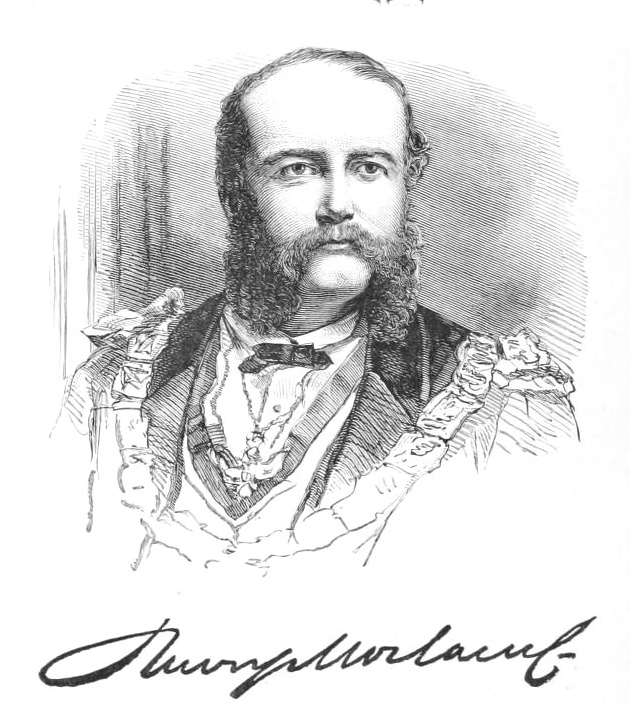

Sir Henry Morland (9 April 1837 – 28 July 1891) was an Indian Navy officer and colonial administrator. He was also a member of several learned societies.

The third son of John Morland, a barrister-at-law, and Elizabeth, daughter of James Thompson, Henry was schooled at Heversham and Bromsgrove apart from the tutorship of Dr Webster of Christ's Hospital. In 1852, he went to join the Indian Navy, posted initially on Akbar and later as a midshipman on the steamer Queen. He worked off the northeastern coast of Africa and saw action at Suhgra in 1853.

In November 1857, he became first mate on Dalhousie. He saw action again at Perim in January 1857 and at Jeddah in July 1858 and rose to become fourth lieutenant on Assaye.

On 30 April 1863, the Indian Navy was abolished and he was put on the retired list and he moved to the Bombay and Bengal Marine (under the British government) and worked on submarine cable laying from 1864 to 1865. He worked during the Abyssinian expedition of 1867 supervising the transport of men and material. He became a transport officer at Bombay and then a conservator of the Bombay port from 1873 and briefly as acting secretary at the Bombay port trust.

He also took interest in the Bombay municipal works and became a member of the corporation in 1868 and the town council in 1877. He headed the committee for the Bombay jubilee address which he presented to the Queen leading to his being knighted on 30 June 1887.

== Affiliations ==
He was a member of the Bombay Geographical Society, a fellow of the Bombay University and a grandmaster in the freemasonry establishment in India.

== Personal life and legacy ==
He married Alice Mary Critchley in 1870 and after her death in 1871, he married Fanny Helen Hannah Carandini in 1875. He died on 28 July 1891. Morland Road in Mumbai was named after him.
