= Naval Works Department (Royal Navy) =

Former authority in the United Kingdom

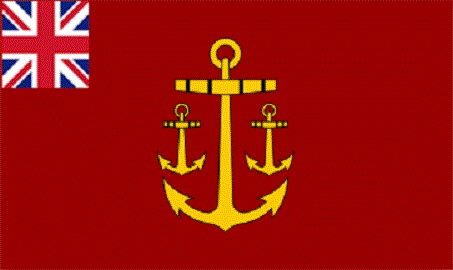
- Flag of the Navy Board

Agency overview
- Formed: 25 March 1796
- Dissolved: 1813
- Superseding agency: Department of the Surveyor of Buildings
- Jurisdiction: Government of the United Kingdom
- Headquarters: Admiralty Navy Office, London
- Agency executives: Inspector-General of Naval Works; Civil Architect and Engineer of the Navy
- Parent department: Admiralty (1796-1808); Navy Office (1808-1813)

The Naval Works Department was the department of the Inspector-General of Naval Works, Brigadier-General Sir Samuel Bentham, who in 1796 had been given responsibility (over and above that of the Navy Board) for modernising and mechanising the Royal Navy dockyards. The department was established under the direct authority of the Board of Admiralty on 25 March 1796. In 1808 Bentham's job title was changed to Civil Architect and Engineer of the Navy, and he and his department were placed under the oversight of the Navy Board. In 1812 Bentham was dismissed and the department dissolved; most of its responsibilities were taken over by a new Department of the Surveyor of Buildings.

== History ==
In the late 18th century, reforming members of the Board of Admiralty were critical of the Navy Board and its management of the Royal Dockyards. The naval dockyards were judged to have fallen short of their civilian counterparts in keeping abreast of developments in the wake of the Industrial Revolution. In 1794 Earl Spencer, newly-appointed First Lord of the Admiralty, visited the private workshop of an 'engineering polymath', Samuel Bentham (erstwhile apprentice shipwright in the Royal Dockyards, who had spent a decade modernising Naval manufacturing establishments in Russia, for which he was knighted by Catherine the Great). When Bentham then offered to assist the Admiralty with modernising and mechanising the Dockyards, he was swiftly put to work. In 1795 the Board of the Admiralty notified the Navy Board that Bentham would shortly be visiting each Dockyard with a view to introducing improvements. The following year his appointment was formalised as Inspector General for Naval Works and the Naval Works Department was established to support him.

In 1807, Bentham's department was renamed the Department of the Civil Architect and Engineer, and oversight was transferred from the Admiralty to the Navy Board. In 1813 the department was abolished and replaced by the Department of the Surveyor of Buildings. The department primarily dealt with constructing new civil engineering works in the Royal Navy Dockyard's such as the church at Chatham Dockyard but was also responsible managing and maintaining existing dockyards, buildings and industrial works. The department was abolished in 1813 when the Admiralty started to directing attention towards architectural works which saw the creation of a new post and department under the Surveyor of Buildings to oversee this transition this in turn led to the creation of a new specialist Architectural and Engineering Works Department in 1837 to be headed by a Director of Naval Works.

== Head of department ==
- Samuel Bentham, Inspector-General of Naval Works (25 March 1796–October 1807)

=== Subsidiary offices ===
Included the following:

==== Office of the architect and engineer of naval works ====
This office was created in 1796. In 1807 responsibility for the Naval Works Department transferred from the Admiralty under the Board of Admiralty to the Navy Board when the officer holder was renamed Assistant Civil Architect and Engineer of the Navy.

Office holders issued by Admiralty warrant included:

- Mr. S. Bunce, 25 March 1796 – 3 January 1804.
- Mr. Edward Holl, 3 January 1804 – 1807.

==== Office of the chemist of naval works ====
This office was created in 1796. In 1807 responsibility for the Naval Works Department transferred from the Admiralty under the Board of Admiralty to the Navy Board when the office was abolished.

Office holders issued by Admiralty warrant included:

- Mr. J. Sadler, 25 March 1796 – 1807.

==== Office of the mechanist of naval works ====
This office was created in 1796. In 1807 responsibility for the Naval Works Department transferred from the Admiralty under the Board of Admiralty to the Navy Board when the officer holder was renamed Mechanist under the Civil Architect and Engineer of the Navy.

Office holders issued by Admiralty warrant included:

- Mr. S. Reke, 25 March 1796 – 25 October 1799.
- Mr. S. Goodrich, 25 October 1799 – 1807.

==== Office of the metal master of naval works ====
The office was created in 1803. In 1807 responsibility for the Naval Works Department transferred from the Admiralty under the Board of Admiralty to the Navy Board when the office was abolished.

Office holders issued by Admiralty warrant included:

- Mr. W. E. Sheffield, 26 April 1803 – 1807.

==== Office of the secretary of naval works ====
The office was created in 1796. In 1807 responsibility for the Naval Works Department transferred from the Admiralty under the Board of Admiralty to the Navy Board when the office was renamed Extra Assistant to the Civil Architect and Engineer of the Navy.

Office holders issued by Admiralty warrant included:

- Mr. J. Peake, 25 March 1796 – 1807.

=== Support offices ===
Included

Draftsmen Office 1796-1805
The office was established in 1796 and then abolished in 1805.

- Mr. J. Burr, 25 March 1796 – 1805

Clerical Office, 1796-1807
A clerical support office was established in the Naval Works Department in 1796. In 1807 when responsibility was transferred from the Board of Admiralty to the Navy Board, the office of the first clerk of naval works was renamed Clerk to the secretary of the Navy Board, whilst the office of the second clerk of naval works was abolished.

Office of the First Clerk

- Mr. T. Darch, 25 March 1796 – 5 January 1801.
- Mr. R. Upsal, 5 January 1801 – 5 July 1804.
- Mr. H. Rodgers, 5 July 1804 – October 1807.

Office of the Second Clerk

- Mr. J. Heidekoo, 25 March 1796 – 22 May 1797.
- Mr. R. Upsal, 22 May 1797 – 5 January 1801.
- Mr. W. Heard, 5 January 1801 – 30 January 1806.
- Mr. D. Drummond, 30 January 1806 – October 1807.

Messengers Office, 1796-1807
The office was created in May 1796 and transferred from the Admiralty Office to the Navy Office in 1807.

- Mr. J. Fetter, 13 May 1796 – 14 July 1803.
- Mr. J. Fetter, 14 July 1803 – October 1807.

== Office of the Civil Architect and Engineer of the Navy (1808 to 1813) ==
=== Head of department ===
- Samuel Bentham, Civil Architect and Engineer of the Navy (3 December 1808 – 25 November 1812).

=== Subsidiary offices ===
Included the following:

==== Office of the assistant civil architect and engineer of the navy ====
The office was created in 1808 when responsibility for the Naval Works Department transferred from the Admiralty under the Board of Admiralty to the Navy Board.

- Mr. Edward Holl, Assistant Civil Architect and Engineer 29 December 1808 – 1812.

Following Bentham's dismissal in 1812, Edward Holl was appointed to head up a new department as Surveyor of Buildings.

==== Office of the draftsmen to the civil architect and engineer of the navy ====
In 1805 following the abolition of the office of the Inspector General of Naval Works the draft men's office ceased to exist after which three new assistant draftsmen posts were created in its place. In 1809, during restructuring talks between the Board of Admiralty Admiralty and the Navy Board, the three assistants were re-appointed as Draftsmen to the Civil Architect and Engineer of the Navy when his office was abolished in 1812 the draftsmen's function was transferred to the Department of the Surveyor of Buildings.

Office holders included:

- Mr. W. Miller, 12 April 1809 – 5 June 1809.
- Mr. W. Heard, 5 June 1809 – 5 June 1809.
- Mr. G. Ainslie, 5 June 1809 – 1812.

==== Office of the mechanist under the civil architect and engineer of the navy ====
The office was created in 1808 when responsibility for the Naval Works Department transferred from the Admiralty under the Board of Admiralty to the Navy Board when the office was renamed mechanist under the civil architect and engineer of the navy from mechanist of naval works.

Office holders included:

- Mr. S. Goodrich, 29 December 1808 – 1812.

==== Office of the extra assistant to the civil architect and engineer of the navy ====
The office was created in 1808 when responsibility for the Naval Works Department transferred from the Admiralty under the Board of Admiralty to the Navy Board when the office was renamed extra assistant to the civil architect and engineer of the navy from secretary of naval works.

Office holders included:

- Mr. J. Peake, 29 December 1808 – 1812.

== Timeline ==
- Navy Board, Inspector General of Naval Works, 1796-1812
- Navy Board, Surveyor of Buildings, 1813-1832
- Board of Admiralty, Surveyor of Buildings, 1832-1837
- Board of Admiralty, Architectural and Engineering Works Department, 1837-1919
- Board of Admiralty, Civil Engineer in Chiefs Department, 1919-1960
- Board of Admiralty, Navy Works Department, 1960-1963

== See also ==
- Navy Office

== Sources ==
- Office-Holders in Modern Britain: Volume 4, Admiralty Officials 1660-1870, ed. J C Sainty (London, 1975), British History Online http://www.british-history.ac.uk/office-holders/vol4 [accessed 16 July 2017].
- Office-Holders in Modern Britain: Volume 7, Navy Board Officials 1660-1832, ed. J M Collinge (London, 1978), British History Online http://www.british-history.ac.uk/office-holders/vol7 [accessed 16 July 2017].
- Rodger, N.A.M. (1979). The Admiralty. Offices of State. Lavenham: T. Dalton. ISBN 0900963948.
