= Cecil Wakeley =

British surgeon

Sir Cecil Pembrey Grey Wakeley, 1st Baronet KBE CB PRCS FRSE (5 May 1892 – 5 June 1979) was a 20th-century British surgeon.

== Life ==
He was born the eldest son of 12 children at Meresborough House, a country estate near Rainham, Kent, the son of Percy Wakeley (1860–1954) and his first wife Mary ("May") Sophia Pembrey (1865–1940). He was educated at King's School, Rochester and Borden Grammar School, both in Kent and then from 1907 to 1910 at Dulwich College.

In 1910 he went to King's College Hospital, where he received the Jelf Medal for surgery and qualified in 1915. He joined the Royal Navy and spent part of World War I as a temporary surgeon aboard the hospital ship HMHS Garth Castle at Scapa Flow. In 1922 he was appointed to the staff at King’s College, London and was senior surgeon from the age of 41 until his retirement.

In 1926 he was elected a Fellow of the Royal Society of Edinburgh. His proposers were David Waterston, Reginald Gladstone, John Millar Thomson and Joseph Strickland Goodall.

In the Second World War he was again a surgeon serving the Royal Navy at the honorary rank of rear admiral. He was made a baronet in 1952.

In 1947 he founded the Annals of the Royal College of Surgeons of England which he continued to edit until 1969. He was president of the college from 1949 to 1954 during the period of establishment of the Faculty of Anaesthesia. He was elected President of the Hunterian Society for 1961.

Wakeley was active in creationist circles and was a member of the Evolution Protest Movement (now Creation Science Movement).

He died in London on 5 June 1979.

== Family ==
He married Elizabeth Muriel Nicholson-Smith (1896–1985) on 21 July 1925 in Kent. They had three sons:

- Sir John Cecil Nicholson Wakeley, 2nd Baronet, father of Charles Wakeley (President of the British Society of Skeletal Radiologists)
- Richard Michael Wakeley
- William Jeremy Wakeley

Baronetage of the United Kingdom
New creation	Baronet (of Liss); 1952–1979	Succeeded by John Cecil Nicholson Wakeley

== Selected publications ==
- Surgical Pathology (1929) [with St. John Dudley Buxton]
- The Pineal Organ (1940) [with Reginald John Gladstone]
- Modern Treatment Therapeutics (1950)
- Sir George Buckston Browne (1957) [with Jessie Dobson]
- Editor of the "Rose and Carless" Manual of Surgery
- Editor of the "British Journal of Surgery"
