= Joshua Field (engineer) =

British civil engineer and mechanical engineer

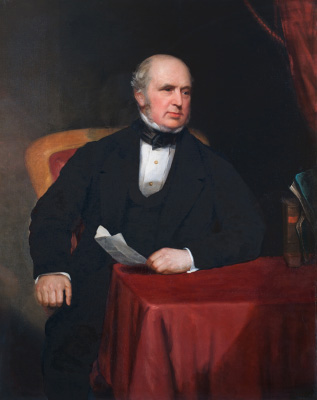
- Joshua Field
- Born: 1786; Hackney, Middlesex
- Died: 11 August 1863 (aged 76–77); Surrey
- Engineering career
- Discipline: Civil engineer, mechanical engineer
- Institutions: Institution of Civil Engineers (president); Fellow of the Royal Society; Fellow of the Royal Society of Arts

Joshua Field FRS (1786 – 11 August 1863) was a British civil engineer and mechanical engineer.

Field was born in Hackney in 1786, his father was John Field a corn and seed merchant who was later to become Master of the Worshipful Company of Merchant Taylors. Field was a pupil of dockyard engineer Simon Goodrich from 1803 to 1805. Commissioned by Samuel Bentham, the Inspector-general of naval works, he worked with Samuel Goodrich to develop tools for mass-producing ships' blocks at Portsmouth Dockyard. The block mills they designed required ten unskilled men to take the place of 110 skilled craftsmen, and have been recognised as the first use of machine tools for mass production. They were built by Henry Maudslay between 1802 and 1806, and represented the first steam-powered manufactory in any dockyard.

He then joined Maudslay to form the firm of Messrs. Maudslay, Sons and Field of Lambeth. One of their projects was to build engines for the SS Great Western's Atlantic crossing of 1838.

He was a prolific engineer working with the Atlantic Telegraph Company on machinery for cable laying, the Metropolitan Board of Works on sewage systems and Isambard Kingdom Brunel on his steamships.

Field joined seven other young engineers who, in 1817, decided to found the Institution of Civil Engineers as a more accessible institution than the established but élitist Society of Civil Engineers founded by John Smeaton in 1771. He served as their vice-president in 1837, and he continued to hold that office until elected president on 18 January 1848, being the first mechanical engineer to hold the presidency and the only one of the original proposers to hold the post. In his inaugural address, delivered on 1 February, he alluded particularly to the changes which had then been introduced into steam navigation which allowed for a greater capacity and speeds. On 3 March 1836 he became a fellow of the Royal Society, and was also a member of the Society of Arts.

Field died at his residence, Balham Hill House, Surrey, on 11 August 1863, aged 76 and was interred at West Norwood Cemetery in a Portland stone sarcophagus.

== Family ==
His daughter, Matilda Field, married Dr Thomas H. Gladstone. Their children included the embryologist, Reginald John Gladstone FRSE (1865-1947).

Reginald married his first cousin (i.e. also a grandchild of Field) Ida Millicant Field in 1912.

== Notes ==
Attribution

This article incorporates text from a publication now in the public domain: "Field, Joshua". Dictionary of National Biography. London: Smith, Elder & Co. 1885–1900.

Professional and academic associations
Preceded by John Rennie	President of the Institution of Civil Engineers; January 1848 – December 1849	Succeeded by William Cubitt
