= Architectural and Engineering Works Department =

British authority

Department overview
- Formed: 1837
- Preceding Department: Naval Works Department
- Dissolved: 1919
- Superseding Department: Civil Engineer in Chief's Department
- Jurisdiction: Government of the United Kingdom
- Headquarters: Emsworth, England
- Parent Department: Admiralty

The Architectural and Engineering Works Department was the main civil engineering department of the British Royal Navy responsible constructing, and maintaining naval buildings, dockyards, ports and managing civil engineering staff from 1837 to 1919 it was superseded by the Civil Engineer in Chief's Department.

== History ==
A specific post with responsibility for the navies expanding civil works programs led to the creation of an Inspector-General of Naval Works in 1796 who's managed civil engineering works in the dockyards under the supervision of the Navy Board. In 1813 the department was renamed to Department of the Surveyor of Buildings administered by the Surveyor of Buildings. Following the abolition of the Navy Board the department was placed under Admiralty control. In 1837 the department, it was renamed the Architectural and Engineering Works Department under a then new Director of Works responsible to the Civil Lord Civil Lord of the Admiralty who managed the Royal Navy's buildings and works departments and land estates. . In 1919 the department was renamed the Civil Engineer in Chief's Department. In January 1960 it became the Navy Works Department under a Director-General, Navy Works. In April 1963 the department ceased to exist when responsibility for building and civil engineering works for the armed services was transferred to the Ministry of Public Building and Works, later Department of the Environment.

== Head of department ==
=== Civil Architect ===
Incomplete list of post holders included:

- Mr. G. L. Taylor Esq. 1837–1837

=== Superintendent of Works, Buildings, and Machinery ===
Incomplete list of post holders included:

- Captain H. R. Brandreth, RE. 1840–1844

=== Director of Architectural and Engineering Naval Works ===
Incomplete list of post holders included:

- Captain H. R. Brandreth, RE. 1845

== Timeline ==
- Navy Board, Inspector General of Naval Works, 1796–1813
- Navy Board, Surveyor of Buildings, 1813–1832
- Board of Admiralty, Surveyor of Buildings, 1832–1837
- Board of Admiralty, Architectural and Engineering Works Department, 1837–1919
- Board of Admiralty, Civil Engineer in Chiefs Department, 1919–1960
- Board of Admiralty, Navy Works Department, 1960–1963

== See also ==
- Admiralty

== Sources ==
- Archives, The National. "Admiralty: Architectural and Engineering Works Department, later Civil Engineer in Chief's Department: Photographs of Works". discovery.nationalarchives.gov.uk. National Archives UK, ADM 195, 1857-1961.
- Morriss, Roger (2004). Naval Power and British Culture, 1760-1850: Public Trust and Government Ideology. Farnham, England: Ashgate. ISBN 9780754630319.
- "REVIEWS The Royal Dockyards 1690-1850: Architecture and Engineering Works of the Sailing Nav". The Mariner's Mirror. The Society for Nautical Research. Vols: 76-77: 285. 1990.
