= Simon Goodrich =

British navy engineer (1773–1847)

Simon Goodrich (1773–1847) was an engineer to the British Navy Board.

== Life ==
He was said to have been born 28 October 1773 in Suffolk. His education and training is unknown. In 1796 he was appointed draughtsman in the office of Sir Samuel Bentham, Inspector General of Naval Works, and in 1799 was promoted to the post of Mechanist and Bentham's deputy. On the incorporation of the Naval Works Department with the Navy Board in 1808, he was given the title of Mechanist under the Civil Architect and Engineer. The office was discontinued on 25 Dec. 1812 on the abolition of the office of Civil Architect, when it was provided that Goodrich should have preference over others of his profession whenever his services were wanted.

Goodrich was responsible to Bentham for the management of the installation of the machinery at the Portsmouth Block Mills, and for the Metal Mills and millwright's shop at Portsmouth. He was also responsible for the mechanical engineering work at all the other Naval Dockyards, and travelled incessantly on Naval business.

As well as his main responsibilities over time he was involved in devising machinery for testing anchor chains; for investigating different firefighting apparatus used on shipboard; reporting on machinery for making rope and cordage, and on saw-milling apparatus; for making seagoing trials of steam vessels. He was also involved greatly in the day-to-day management of the manufacturing staff. He was in close contact with many of the important engineers of the time, including Richard Trevithick, Matthew Murray, Henry Maudslay, Sir Marc Isambard Brunel and, particularly, Joshua Field.

== Family ==
Goodrich married Susanna Lloyd on 25 December 1797 at the Navy church of Saint Martin in the Fields, Westminster and had two daughters. He lived at 9 Upper Eton St Pimlico in 1811 and in various locations in Portsmouth. On his retirement Goodrich moved to Lisbon, and died there 3 September 1847 and was survived by his wife.

== Legacy ==
After his death, Goodrich's papers and drawings were returned to England, and by 1875 were in a library collection somewhere (the location has yet to be discovered). They were later transferred to the library of the Science Museum, London which has now been transferred to Wroughton, Swindon. The SML accessioning records give no clue about the origins. The Simon Goodrich papers are a source of detailed information about what is something of a dark age in our knowledge of the engineering background to the Industrial Revolution.
