= George Fordyce =

British chemist (1736–1802)

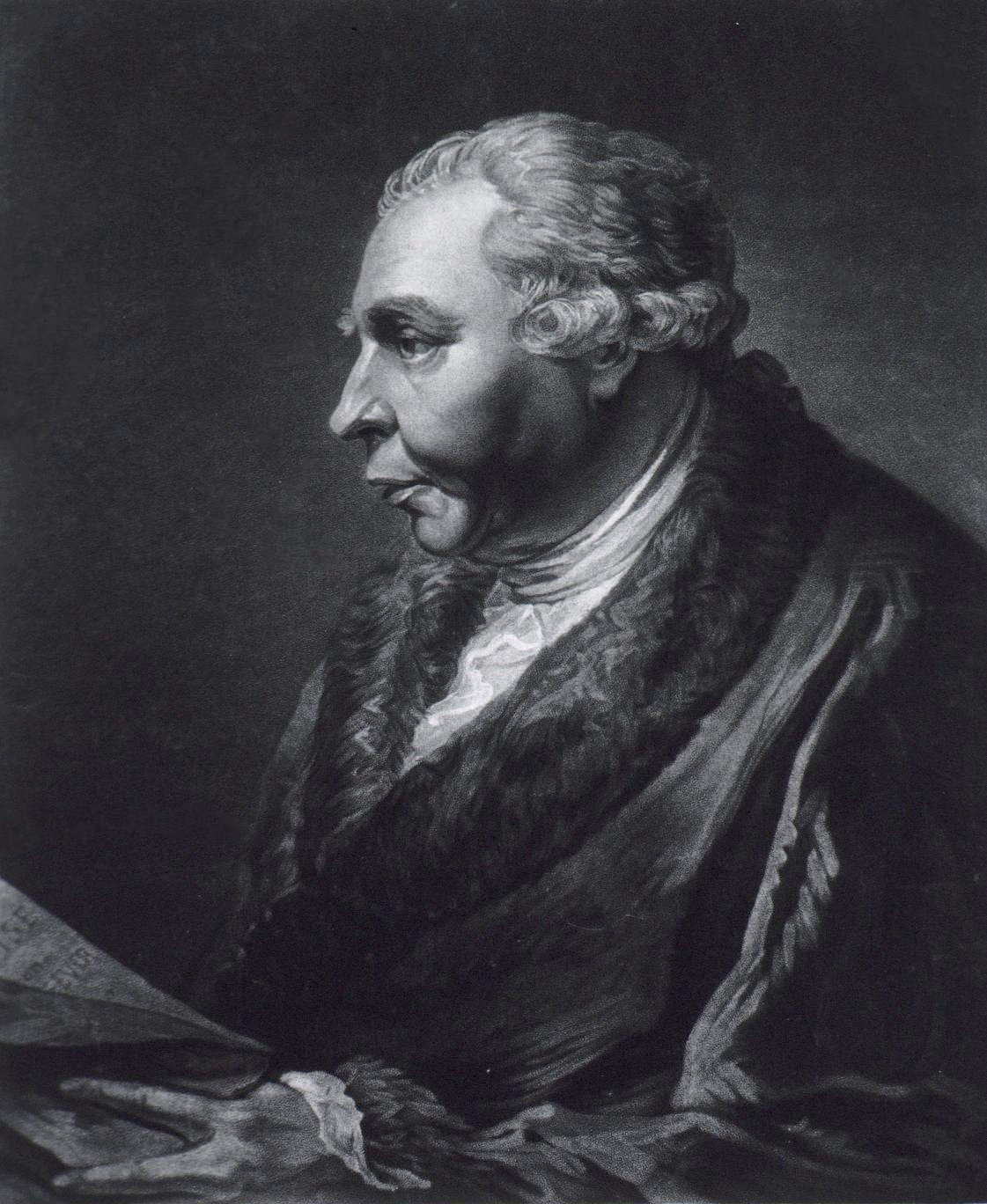
- Born: 18 November 1736; Aberdeen, Scotland
- Died: 25 May 1802 (aged 65); London, England
- Education: University of Aberdeen; University of Edinburgh
- Scientific career
- Academic advisors: William Cullen

George Fordyce FRS FRCP (18 November 1736 – 25 May 1802) was a Scottish physician, lecturer on medicine, and chemist, who was a Fellow of the Royal Society and a Fellow of the Royal College of Physicians.

== Early life ==
George Fordyce was born at Aberdeen in 1736, a short time after the death of his father, George Fordyce, proprietor of a small landed estate called Broadford, near the city. He was taken from home at the age of two following his mother's remarriage and was sent to Foveran, Aberdeenshire, where he received his schooling. Following that he attended the University of Aberdeen where he attained the degree of Master of Arts at the age of 14.

== Career ==
Fordyce had decided to study medicine and was apprenticed to his uncle, Dr. John Fordyce, in Uppingham, in Rutland. He later returned to the University of Edinburgh, where he took his degree of M.D. in 1758; his inaugural dissertation was on catarrh. From Edinburgh he went to Leyden, where he studied anatomy under the famous anatomist Bernhard Siegfried Albinus.

In 1759 he returned to England, having decided to settle in London as a teacher and medical practitioner. Despite his relations' disapproval, he persisted, and by the end of 1759 had commenced a course of lectures upon chemistry. In 1764, he also began to lecture upon Materia medica and the practice of physic. He delivered these lectures for nearly 30 years. According to the Dictionary of National Biography, his habits had always been such as to try his constitution; and in early life, it is said, he often reconciled the claims of pleasure and business by lecturing for three hours in the morning without having gone to bed the night before.

In 1765 he became a licentiate of the Royal College of Physicians and in 1770 was elected physician to St Thomas' Hospital. In 1774 he was chosen as a member of the Literary Club, in 1776 a Fellow of the Royal Society, and in 1778 a Fellow of the Royal College of Physicians. This latter was chiefly to secure his assistance with a new edition of the college's Pharmacopoeia. He was Harveian Orator in 1791.

In 1783, with John Hunter, he assisted in setting up a small society of physicians and surgeons, which later published several volumes of transactions under the title of Transactions of a Society for the improvement of medical and chirurgical knowledge, and attended its meetings regularly until shortly before his death.

== Dining habits ==
Fordyce was an eccentric, who ate only one meal of meat a day at the same hour in the same place. He would always eat a pound and a half of rump steak and whilst this was being prepared, half a broiled chicken or plate of fish.

As reported in The Epicure's Almanack (1815, page 3), Fordyce dined daily at Dolly's Chophouse:

"At this house the ingenious anatomist and chemical lecturer, Dr. George Fordyce, dined every day for more than twenty years. His research in comparative anatomy had led him to conclude that man, through custom, eats oftener than nature requires, one meal a day being sufficient for that noble animal the lion. He made the experiment on himself at this, his favorite house, and finding it succeeded, he continued the following regimen for the term above mentioned. At four o'clock, his accustomed hour of dining, he entered, and took his seat at a table always reserved for him, on which were instantly placed a silver tankard full of strong ale; a bottle of port wine, and a measure containing a quarter pint of brandy. The moment the waiter announced him, the cook put a pound and a half of rump steak on the gridiron, and on the table a delicate trifle as a bon bouche, to serve until the steak was ready. This morsel was sometimes half a broiled chicken, sometimes a plate of fish: when he had eaten this, he took one glass of his brandy, and then proceeded to devour his steak. We say devour, because he always ate so rapidly that one might imagine that he was hurrying away to a patient, to deprive death of a dinner. When he had finished his meat, he took the remainder of his brandy, having, during his dinner, drunk the tankard of ale, and afterwards the bottle of port. He thus daily spent an hour and a half of his time, and then returned to his house in Essex Street, to give his six-o'clock lecture on chemistry. He made no other meal until his return next day at four o'clock to Dolly's."

== Family ==
In 1762 he married the daughter of Charles Stuart, Esq., conservator of Scottish privileges in the United Netherlands, by whom he had four children: two sons and two daughters. His daughter Mary Sophia Fordyce married Samuel Bentham (Jeremy Bentham's brother).

He died in London in 1802, of disorders connected with gout, and was buried at St Anne's, Soho.

== Bibliography ==
=== Books ===
- Elements of Agriculture and Vegetation (London, 1781). This was a collection of a course of lectures assembled by one of his listeners. Fordyce corrected the copy, and afterwards published it under this title.
- Elements of the practice of Physic (London, 1768–1770). This was used by him as a textbook for a part of his course of lectures on that subject.
- A Treatise on the Digestion of Food (London, 1791). It was originally read before the College of Physicians, as the Guelstonian Lecture.
- Four Dissertations on Fever (1794–1803). A fifth, which completed the subject, was left by him in manuscript form, and posthumously published. Boston 1823 edition.

=== Papers ===
Published in the Philosophical Transactions of the Royal Society:

- Of the Light produced by Inflammation.
- Examination of various Ores in the Museum of Dr W. Hunter.
- A New Method of assaying Copper Ores.
- An Account of some Experiments on the Loss of Weight in Bodies on being melted or heated.
- An Account of an Experiment on Heat.
- The Cronian Lecture on Muscular Motion.
- On the Cause of the additional Weight which Metals acquire on being calcined.
- Account of a New Pendulum, being the Bakerian Lecture.

Published in the Medical and Chirurgical Transactions:

- Observations on the Small-pox, and Causes of Fever.
- An Attempt to improve the Evidence of Medicine.
- Some Observations upon the composition of Medicines.
