= Edward Holl =

Architect

- Died: 1823; Chelsea, London
- Occupation: Architect
- Buildings: Chatham Dockyard buildings, England, United Kingdom; Royal Dockyard Buildings, Bermuda

Edward Holl was an architect to the Navy Board, then later Surveyor of Buildings to the Board of Admiralty of the Royal Navy. His father is presumed to be Edward Holl, a stonemason from Beccles in Suffolk, who died in January 1816.

== Career ==
Edward Holl became an architect in the Navy Board for the Royal Navy in 1804; the second architect employed after Samuel Bunce. He was employed by Brigadier General Sir Samuel Bentham (Inspector General of Naval Works).

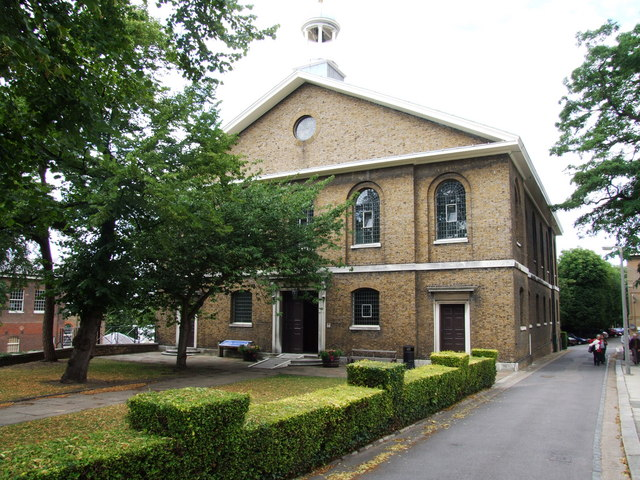
Chatham Dockyard Church, designed by Edward Holl

The Admiralty agreed to the construction of a chapel in Chatham, England in November 1805. Designed by Holl, and built by dock craftsmen, it was completed in 1810.

In 1806 in Chatham Dockyard, Holl designed the No. 1 Smithery which featured three ranges around an open courtyard. Holl supervised William Pilkington who designed and built the Naval Hospital at Great Yarmouth between 1809 and 1811.

Upnor Castle House in Upnor was enlarged and re-fronted in 1807. It was previously a cottage for the senior officer in charge of the castle, which was tasked with protecting warships at nearby Chatham Dockyard. It an example of a Georgian country home. Holl is presumed to be the architect who designed it.

The Inspector General's department was abolished in 1812, resulting in Holl being directly employed by the Navy Board. He assumed a new role, Surveyor of Buildings, which was used during the extensive re-building of the Navy's fleet bases at Portsmouth and Plymouth Dock (Devonport), England. He re-designed the East Ropery building, formerly the spinning house, in Devonport, England. Originally constructed between 1763–71, it had been gutted by fire in 1812. Despite being damaged during World War II, the East Ropery is the only Holl-designed building remaining in the dockyard today.

A new chapel at Plymouth was built in 1814 based on Holl's original designs from 1797. The chapel was destroyed during World War II. In 1815, he drew up plans with John Rennie for Pembroke Dockyard in Wales. The dock included a row of shipbuilding slips, a dry dock, and a single line of buildings including storehouses, offices, kilns, a mould loft, and a pitch house. Various other structures in Pembroke Dockyard were constructed during later years, including the following: the entrance gates and lodges (1817); several terraces of houses (1817–1818); the fleet surgeon's house, the Sunderland House, and the Old Storehouse (all 1822); and the Captain Superintendent's house (1832–1834), later used as a hotel.

Between 1815 and 1817, the School of Naval Architecture at Portsmouth was designed and built according to Holl's designs. The school closed in 1932. Also in 1817, the Navy Board authorised a lead and paint mill at Chatham. Holl designed a fireproof structure with cast-iron pillars, iron beams, yorkstone paving for the floors, and a brick exterior.

Bermuda Royal Naval Hospital was built in 1818 according to the original designs of Holl and John Rennie. Used initially as a quarantine unit, it was later used to treat convicts who were re-building the dockyard. The hospital featured a cast-iron frame and locally sourced limestone stonework. The Royal Navy appointed the surgeon, doctors and medical staff. The hospital was used during World War II to treat many wounded sailors brought in from vessels damaged by torpedoes. The Royal Navy left Bermuda in the 1950s, and the hospital was demolished in 1972.

In 1820, several barracks in the Caribbean (such as those in Barbados, Bermuda, Antigua and St Lucia and St Vincent) were designed by Colonel Sir Charles Smith using Holl's designs.

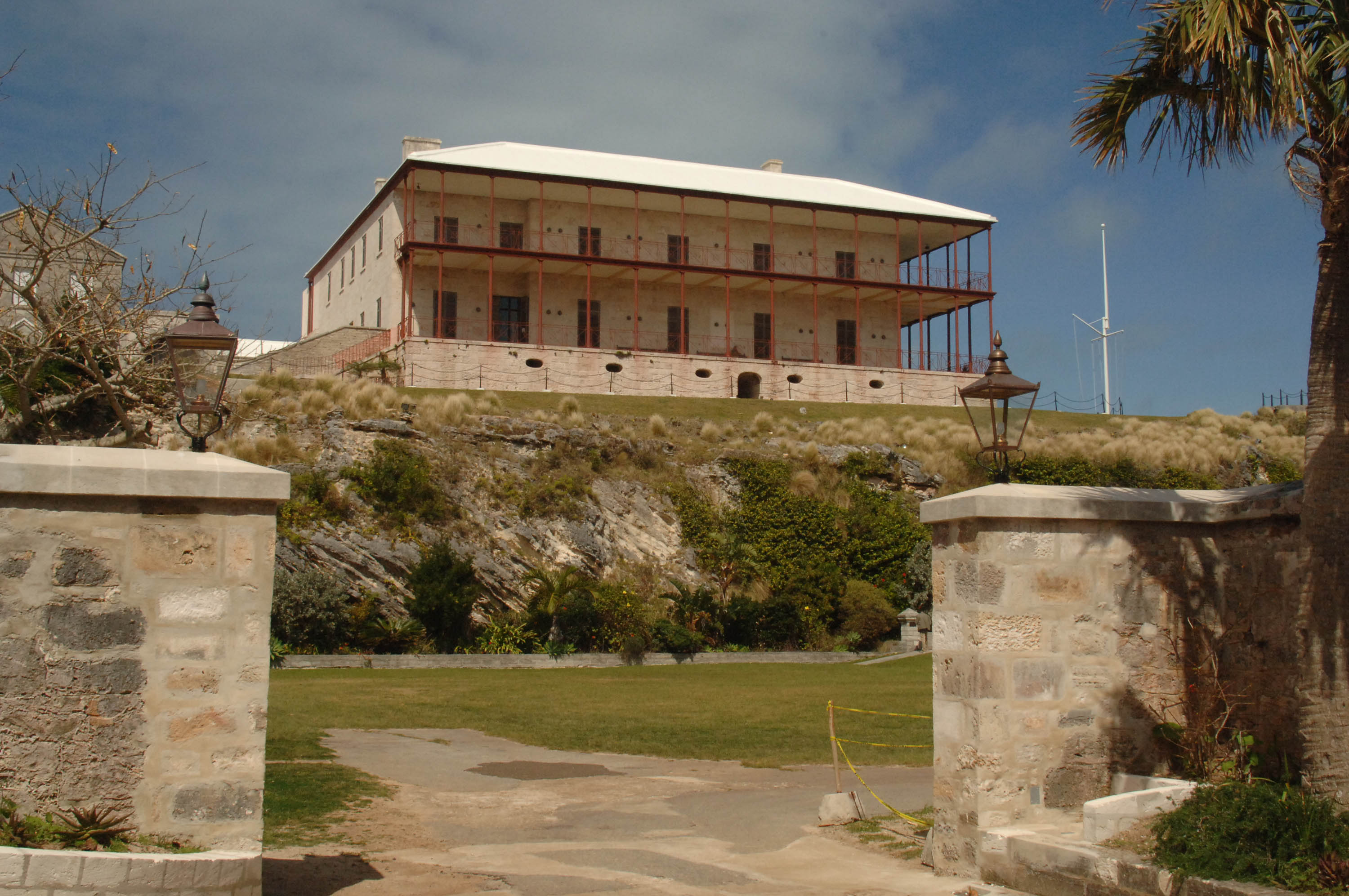
Commissioner's House in Bermuda, designed by Edward Holl

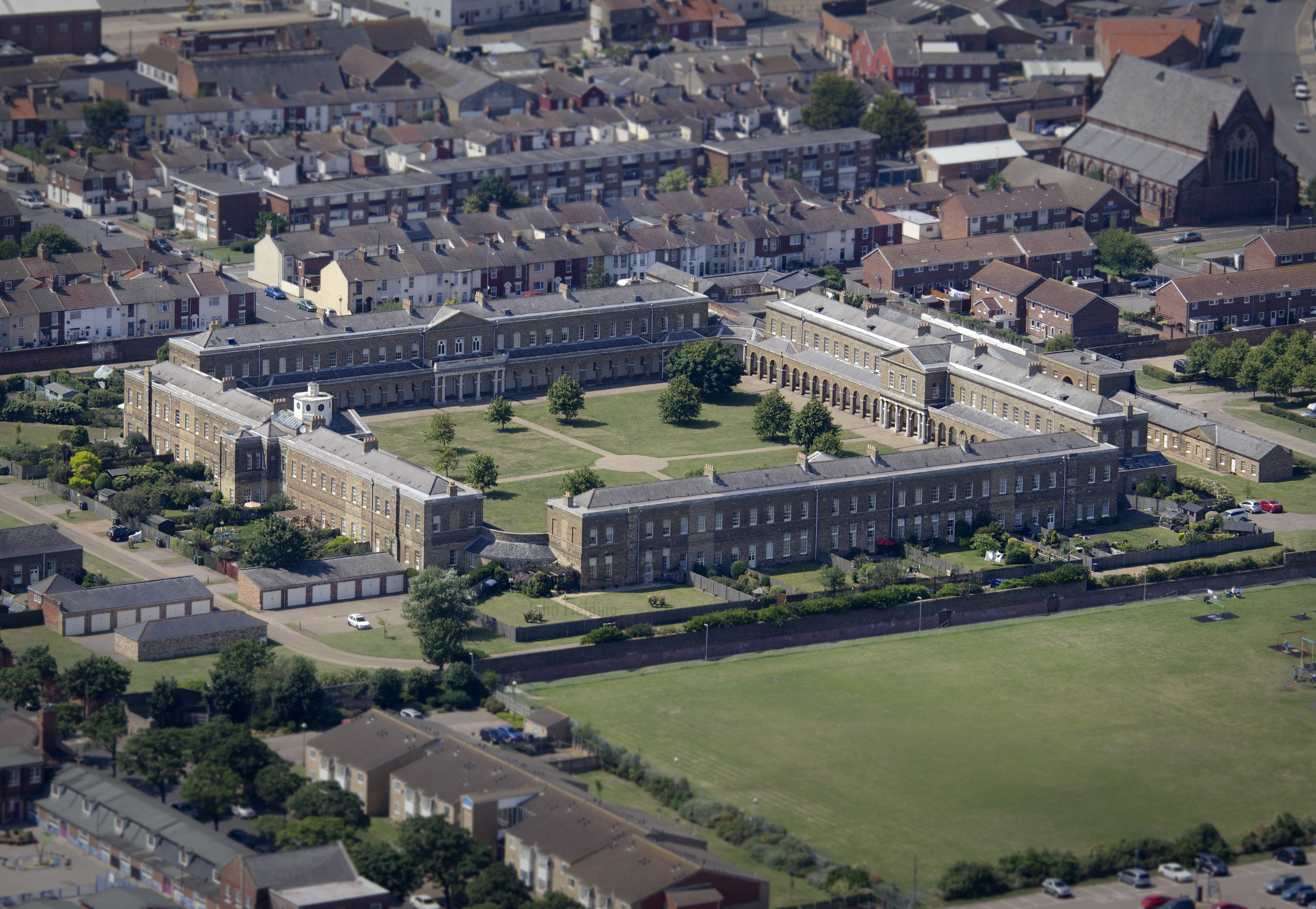
Saint Nicholas Royal Naval Hospital, Great Yarmouth

Bermuda Dockyard was also designed by Holl and included the Commissioner's House. Many of the materials used were pre-fabricated in London and then transported to Bermuda, saving labour and material costs for the project. Featuring iron as its main structural material, the house was later completed by George Ledwell Taylor.

Edward Holl died in Chelsea, England in December 1823. Inside Chelsea Old Church, there is a memorial to "EDWARD HOLL, 1823".

Between 1824–1829, a large storehouse building based on Holl's designs was built at Sheerness Dockyard. The storehouse was constructed with thick, stone brick walls supporting an iron frame and stone floors, and featured a granite entrance leading to a large quadrangle of four-storied ranges. The storehouse was demolished in 1980.

== Major works ==
- 1804–1824 Chatham Dockyard Offices; Chatham Dockyard Chapel; sawmills (with M.I. Brunel); lead and paint mills and pumping station (with John Rennie), England, United Kingdom.
- 1806–1807 Royal Naval Dockyard, Bermuda and Commissioner's House (now used by Bermuda Maritime Museum)
- 1809–1811 St Nicholas Naval Hospital, Great Yarmouth, England, United Kingdom (closed in 1993 and converted into apartments in 1996)
- 1812 Devonport Dockyard, East Ropery building (formerly the spinning house)
