= Surveyor of Buildings (Royal Navy) =

Former authority in the United Kingdom

Office of the Surveyor of Buildings
- Department of the Admiralty
- Reports to: Board of Admiralty, (1796-1807), Navy Board, (1807-1832), Board of Admiralty, (1832-1837)
- Nominator: First Lord of the Admiralty
- Appointer: Prime Minister; Subject to formal approval by the King-in-Council
- Term length: Not fixed (usually for life)
- Inaugural holder: Mr. Edward Holl
- Formation: 1812-1837

The Surveyor of Buildings, also known as the Department of the Surveyor of Buildings, was the civil officer initially a member of the Navy Board then later the Board of Admiralty responsible for superintending, maintaining and improving the British Royal Navy Dockyards, Naval Buildings, and Architectural Works of the Admiralty from 1812 to 1837.

== History ==
The office holder evolved out of an earlier post in 1796 when an Inspector-General of Naval Works was appointed to superintend the Naval Works Department then under the Board of Admiralty with responsibility for all civil engineering works in the royal naval dockyards. In 1806 the Commissioners of Enquiry for Revising and Digesting the Civil Affairs of the Royal Navy produced a fourth report (since 1785) in which they recommended the abolition of the Inspector-Generals Department as a semi-autonomous function and recommended the role be re-styled and its responsibilities broadened. In 1807 the title was changed to the Civil Architect and Engineer of the Navy his department then reported directly to the Navy Board. In 1813 the title and role was changed to Surveyor of Buildings whose responsibilities shifted focus towards architectural works. In 1827 the Surveyors department was expanded to include the duties of managing the buildings belonging to the Victualling Department and including its various yards and stations. In 1832 the Navy Board was abolished and its role and responsibilities were merged into the Admiralty. In 1837 following restructuring the surveyors department was abolished and its functions merged into a new Architectural and Engineering Works Department under a Director of Naval Works who then reported to the Civil Lord of the Admiralty.

== Office holders ==
=== Surveyor of Building (1812-1837) ===
- Mr. Edward Holl, 28 November 1812 - 3 February 1824
- Mr. George Ledwell Taylor, 3 February 1824 - 1837,

== Timeline ==
- Board of Admiralty, Inspector-General of Naval Works, 1796-1807
- Navy Board, Civil Architect and Engineer of the Navy, 1808-1812
- Navy Board, Surveyor of Buildings, 1812-1832
- Board of Admiralty, Surveyor of Buildings, 1832-1837
- Board of Admiralty, Architectural and Engineering Works Department, 1837-1919
- Board of Admiralty, Civil Engineer in Chiefs Department, 1919-1960
- Board of Admiralty, Navy Works Department, 1960-1963

== Sources ==
- Archives, National, (1796-1960), Records of Works Departments, https://discovery.nationalarchives.gov.uk/details/r/C711/Records of Works Departments.
- Clowes. Laird. William. (1899), The Royal Navy, A History from the Earliest Times to Present, Volume IV, and Volume V, Sampson Lowe Marston and Co, London.
- Office-Holders in Modern Britain: Volume 7, Navy Board Officials 1660-1832, ed. J M Collinge (London, 1978), British History Online http://www.british-history.ac.uk/office-holders/vol7 [accessed 9 June 2017].
- Naval works department, in Office-Holders in Modern Britain: Volume 4, Admiralty Officials 1660-1870, ed. J C Sainty (London, 1975), pp. 91–94. British History Online http://www.british-history.ac.uk/office-holders/vol4/pp91-94 [accessed 14 July 2017].
- Rodgers N.A.M. (1979), The Admiralty, Offices of State, Terrance Dalton Ltd, Lavenham, England. ISBN 0900963948
- Skempton A. W. (2002). A Biographical Dictionary of Civil Engineers in Great Britain and Ireland: 1500-1830, Volume 1 of A Biographical Dictionary of Civil Engineers in Great Britain and Ireland. Thomas Telford, England. ISBN 9780727729392
