= Maudslay, Sons and Field =

Engineering company based in Lambeth, London

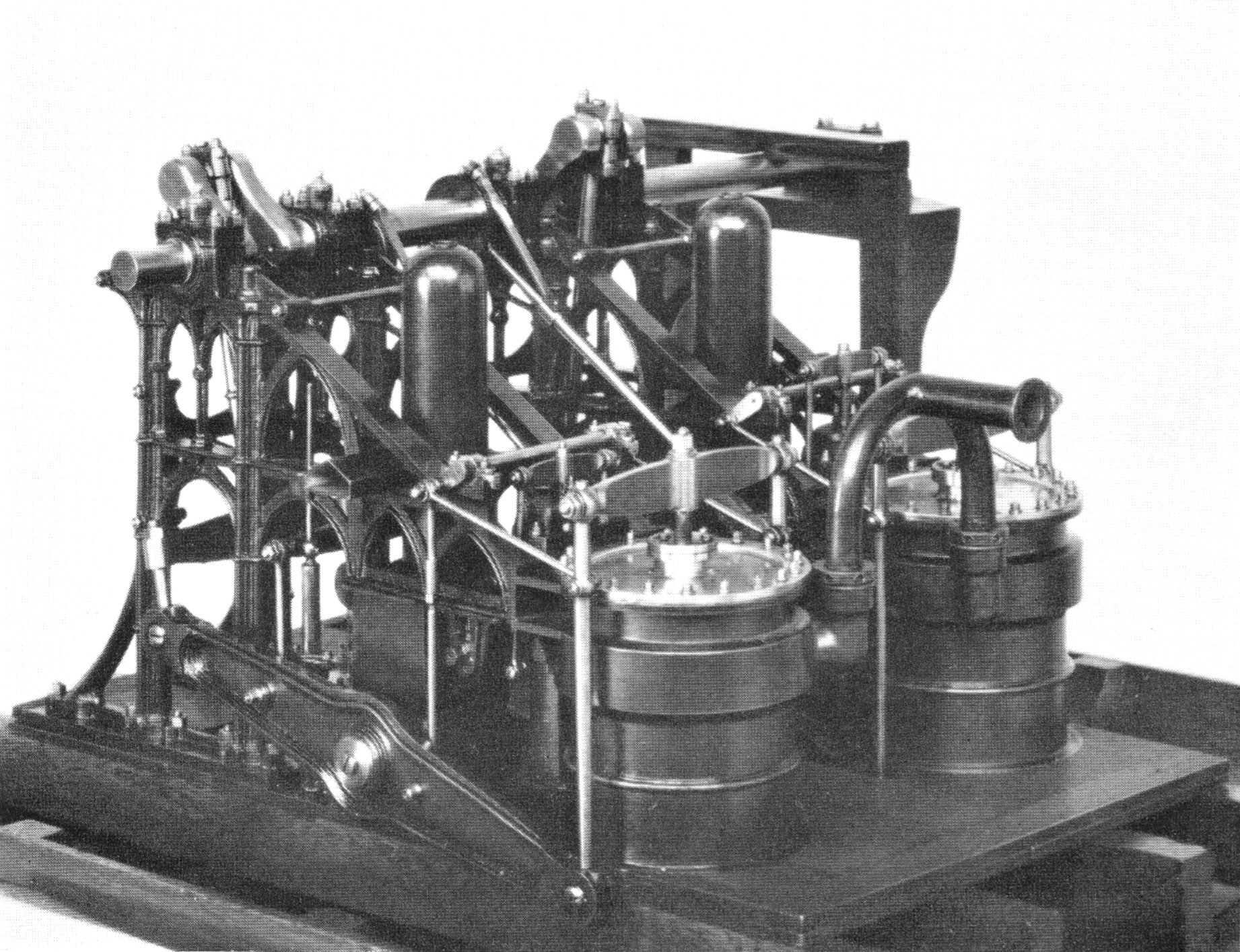
- Industry: Engineering
- Founded: 1798
- Defunct: 1900
- Fate: Closed down, 1900
- Headquarters: Lambeth, London
- Key people: Henry Maudslay, Joshua Field
- Products: Marine steam engines

Maudslay, Sons and Field was an engineering company based in Lambeth, London.

== History ==
The company was founded by Henry Maudslay as Henry Maudslay and Company in 1798 and was later reorganised into Maudslay, Sons and Field in 1833 after his sons Thomas and Joseph, as well as Joshua Field joined the company. It specialised in building marine steam engines. The company produced a special steam-powered mill for the 1852 re-cutting of the Koh-i-Noor.

== See also ==
- Great Wheel
