= Mary Sophia Bentham =

British botanist and author

- Born: c. 1765
- Died: 1858 (aged 92–93)
- Spouse: Samuel Bentham
- Children: George Bentham
- Father: George Fordyce

Mary Sophia Bentham (c. 1765 – 1858) was a British botanist and author.

Bentham was a daughter of chemist George Fordyce (1736–1802), wife of mechanical engineer Samuel Bentham (1757–1831), and mother of botanist George Bentham (1800–1884).
