= Civil Lord of the Admiralty =

Former position of the British Royal Navy

Office of the Civil Lord of the Admiralty
- Seal of H.M. Government
- Department of the Admiralty
- Member of: Board of Admiralty
- Reports to: First Lord of the Admiralty
- Nominator: First Lord of the Admiralty
- Appointer: Prime Minister; Subject to formal approval by the Queen-in-Council
- Term length: Not fixed (typically 3–7 years)
- Inaugural holder: Charles Ross
- Formation: 1830–1964

The Civil Lord of the Admiralty formally known as the Office of the Civil Lord of Admiralty also referred to as the Department of the Civil Lord of the Admiralty was a member of the Board of Admiralty who was responsible for managing the Royal Navy's supporting civilian staff, the works and buildings departments and naval lands from 1830 to 1964.

== History ==
From 1709 the board of admiralty usually had a minimum of two Civil Lord Commissioners, however, there was not a settled arrangement for the distribution of duties amongst the members of the Board. In 1805 the First Lord of the Admiralty Charles Middleton, the Lord Barham, began a period of reform of the commissioners responsibilities during his tenure. He initially gave a new name to the Naval Lord Commissioners now referred to as "Professional Naval Lords", whilst the Civil Lords were given the duty of signing off all official documents.

In 1830 when Sir James Graham was appointed First Lord he also underwent further re-organising of the board following the abolition of the Navy Board each of the members were given particular responsibility for different areas of naval administration from this year it was fixed in principle that, other than the First Lord, there should be four Naval Lords; and one Civil Lord who was added in 1832. This arrangement was subject to minor variations. In 1834-5 there were three Naval and two Civil Lords.

Between 1830 and 1868 he had main responsibility for Naval Finance, this however changed when Parliamentary Secretary was re-designated the Parliamentary and Financial Secretary. In January 1869 the civil lord through an order in Order in Council was designated an assistant to the First Lord of the Admiralty. These orders usually had a much wider remit in that they outlined the general regulations of governance of the Naval Service.

In March 1872 another order in council was issued this time the civil lord would have specific duties assigned to them by the First Lord defining on this occasion the structure of the board. In 1874 the civil lord was given much wider powers. Exceptional changes to these rules meant that during wartime periods additional civil lords (though not officially styled so until after 1882) were added to the board to ease the burden of workload on the Civil Lord. The office existed until 1964 when the Admiralty was abolished and replaced by the Navy Department within a new Ministry of Defence.

== Responsibilities ==
The Civil Lord assisted the First Lord in political and parliamentary duties, between 1830 and 1964 his remit changed from time to time but generally included the following responsibilities:

- Deal with all special questions relating to the retirements, pay, and allowances of naval and marine officers and men.
- Direct Civil Engineering Works.
- Manage all Admiralty buildings including repairs and the construction as well as the storing of building materials that were within the Works Department.
- Manage business within the Greenwich Hospital Department.
- Manage compassionate allowances, the admiralty charitable fund, the allowances to ministers of religion, the various Dockyard and Marine Schools.
- Manage leasing arrangements in regards to coastguard stations.
- Superintendence of all Admiralty works and labour services.
- Superintend all civilian staff at naval establishments, including: classifications, appointments, promotions, pay, allowances, and pensions, excluding appointments and promotions in London, and of professional officers of the Controller's Department of Dockyards.
- Superintends the Contracts Department.
- Superintends the Department of the Accountant General of the Navy. (in 1932 this department is abolished its financial functions were merged within the Department of the Permanent Secretary.

== Civil Lords of the Admiralty ==
Included:

- Charles Ross, July 1830 – May 1832
- Henry Labouchere, 1st Baron Taunton, June 1832 – December 1834
- Lord Ashley, December 1834 – March 1834 (held jointly with Maurice Fitzgerald)
- Sir Maurice FitzGerald, December 1834 – March 1835 (held jointly with Anthony Ashley Cooper, Lord Ashley)
- Archibald Primrose, Lord Dalmeny, 1835 – July 1841
- Henry Lowry-Corry, 1841–1845
- Henry FitzRoy, 1845–1846
- William Cowper, 1846–1854
- Sir Robert Peel, 1855–1857
- Thomas George Baring, 1857–1858
- Lord Lovaine, 1858–1859
- Frederick Lygon, March–April 1859
- Samuel Whitbread, June 1859 – March 1863
- Marquess of Hartington, March–April 1863
- James Stansfeld, May 1863 – April 1864
- Hugh Childers, 1864–1865
- Henry Fenwick, January–April 1866
- Captain Lord John Hay, April–May 1866
- George Shaw-Lefevre, May–July 1866
- Sir Charles du Cane, 1866–1867
- Frederick Stanley, 1868
- Sir George Otto Trevelyan, 1868–1870
- Robert Haldane-Duncan, 3rd Earl of Camperdown, 1870–1874
- Sir Massey Lopes, 1874–1880
- William Caine, 1884–1885
- Ellis Ashmead-Bartlett, 1885–1885
- Robert Abercromby, 1886–1886
- Ellis Ashmead-Bartlett, 1886–1892
- Edmund Robertson, 1892–1895
- Austen Chamberlain, 1895–1900
- Colonel Arthur Lee, 1903–1905
- George Lambert, 1905–1915
- Sir Arthur Pease
- Sir Bolton Eyres-Monsell, 1921–1922
- Frank Hodges, 1924–1924
- George Hall, 1929–1931
- Kenneth Lindsay, 1935–1937
- John Llewellin, 1937–1939
- Sir Austin Hudson, 1939–1942
- Sir Richard Pilkington, 1942–1945
- Stoker Edwards, 1945–1951
- Simon Wingfield-Digby 1951-1957
- Thomas Galbraith, 1957–1959
- Ian Orr-Ewing, 1959–1963
- John Hay, 1963–1964

== Departments under the civil lord ==
Included:

- Office of the Additional Civil Lord of the Admiralty
- Architectural and Engineering Works Department
- Contracts Department
- Civil Engineer in Chief's Department
- Department of the Accountant General of the Navy
- Department of the Director of Contract Labour
- Department of Dockyards
- Dockyard Schools
- Greenwich Hospital Department
- Marine Schools
- Navy Works Department
- Works Department
- Works Loan Department

== Attribution ==
Primary source for this article is by Harley Simon, Lovell Tony, (2016), Civil Lord of the Admiralty, dreadnoughtproject.org, http://www.dreadnoughtproject.org.

== Sources ==
- Admiralty. Return "of the Distribution of Business under the Lords of the Admiralty under the Old and New Arrangement for conducting the business of the Department." H.C. 84, 1869. Copy in Greene Papers. National Maritime Museum. GEE/2.
- Hansard (1803–2005), Offices, Civil Lord of Admiralty, https://api.parliament.uk/historic-hansard/offices/civil-lord-of-admiralty.
- The Orders in Council for the Regulation of the Naval Service. Vol. III. London: For Her Majesty's Stationery Office. 1873.
