= Annals of the Royal College of Surgeons of England =

- Language: English
- Edited by: Professor Benedict Rogers

Publication details
- Publisher: Royal College of Surgeons of England
- Frequency: 8/year
- Impact factor: 1.220 (2019)

Standard abbreviations
- ISO 4: Ann. R. Coll. Surg. Engl.

Indexing
- ISSN: 0035-8843

Links
- Journal homepage

Annals of the Royal College of Surgeons of England is a medical journal published eight times a year by the College, in January, March, April, May, July, September, October and November. The sister journal of the Annals is the Bulletin of the Royal College of Surgeons of England.

The Annals publishes peer reviewed papers on all branches of surgery, with emphasis on clinical research. It also includes: letters and comments, a technical section, news from NICE, discussion of controversial topics, CORESS feedback, and book reviews. There is in addition a selection of trainee presentations from England and Wales. The editorial board consists of members of the College Council and experts from surgical specialties.

The current Editor-in-Chief of the Annals is Professor Benedict Rogers. Back issues from one year ago or more are archived on PubMed Central and thus may be accessed free of charge. Current and recent issues can be accessed online via Ingenta Connect.

As of 2019, the impact factor for the Annals is 1.220.

The journal is indexed in PubMed and Science Citation Index.
