= Portsmouth Block Mills =

Building in Portsmouth, Hampshire, England

Coordinates: 50.8035°N 1.1093°W

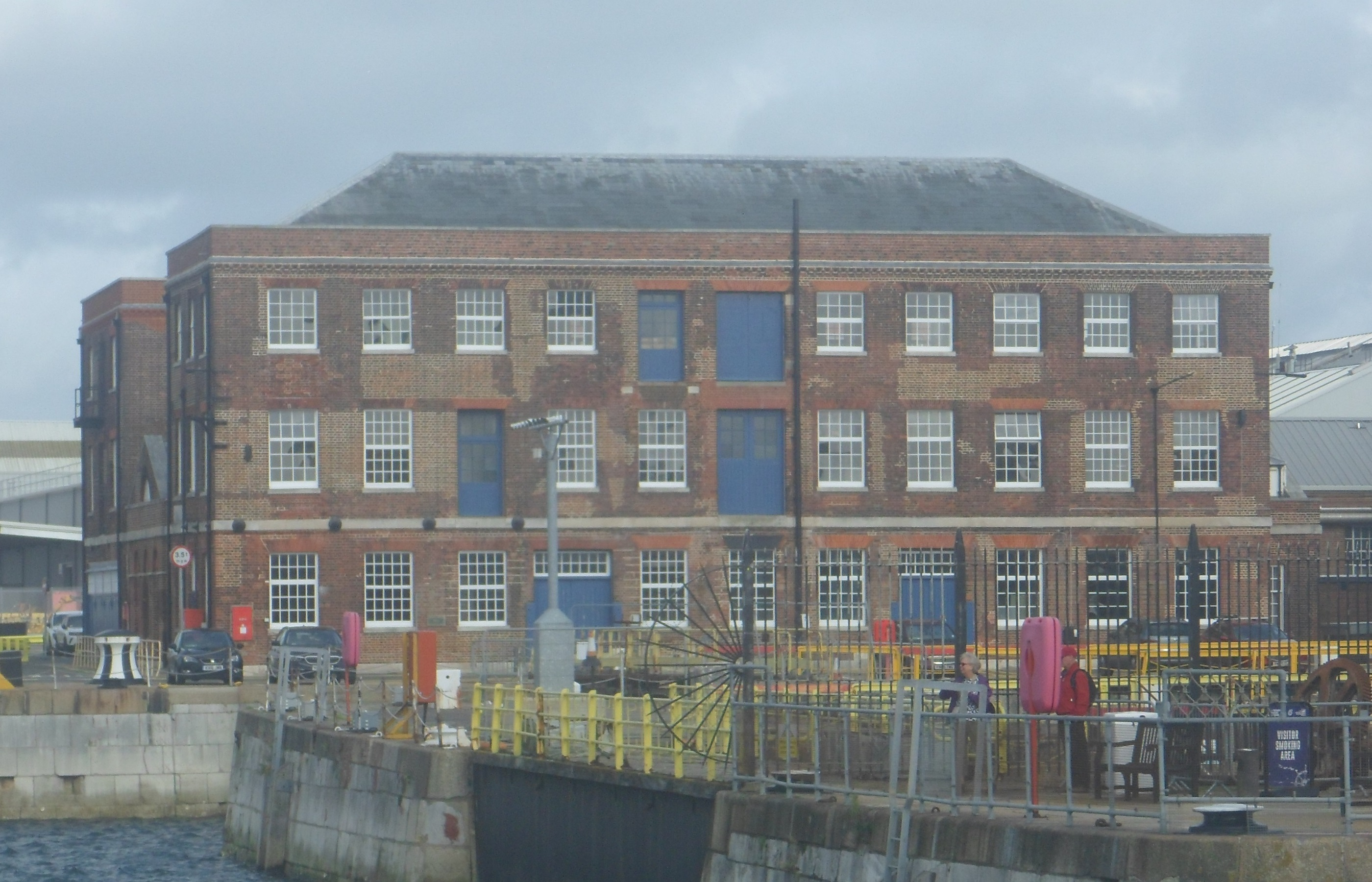
The exterior of the Block Mills in October 2022

The Portsmouth Block Mills form part of the Portsmouth Dockyard at Portsmouth, Hampshire, England, and were built during the Napoleonic Wars to supply the British Royal Navy with pulley blocks. They started the age of mass-production using all-metal machine tools (designed chiefly by Marc Isambard Brunel), and are regarded as one of the seminal buildings of the British Industrial Revolution. They are also the site of the first stationary steam engines used by the Admiralty.

Since 2003 English Heritage has been undertaking a detailed survey of the buildings and the records relating to the machines.

== Development of Portsmouth Dockyard ==
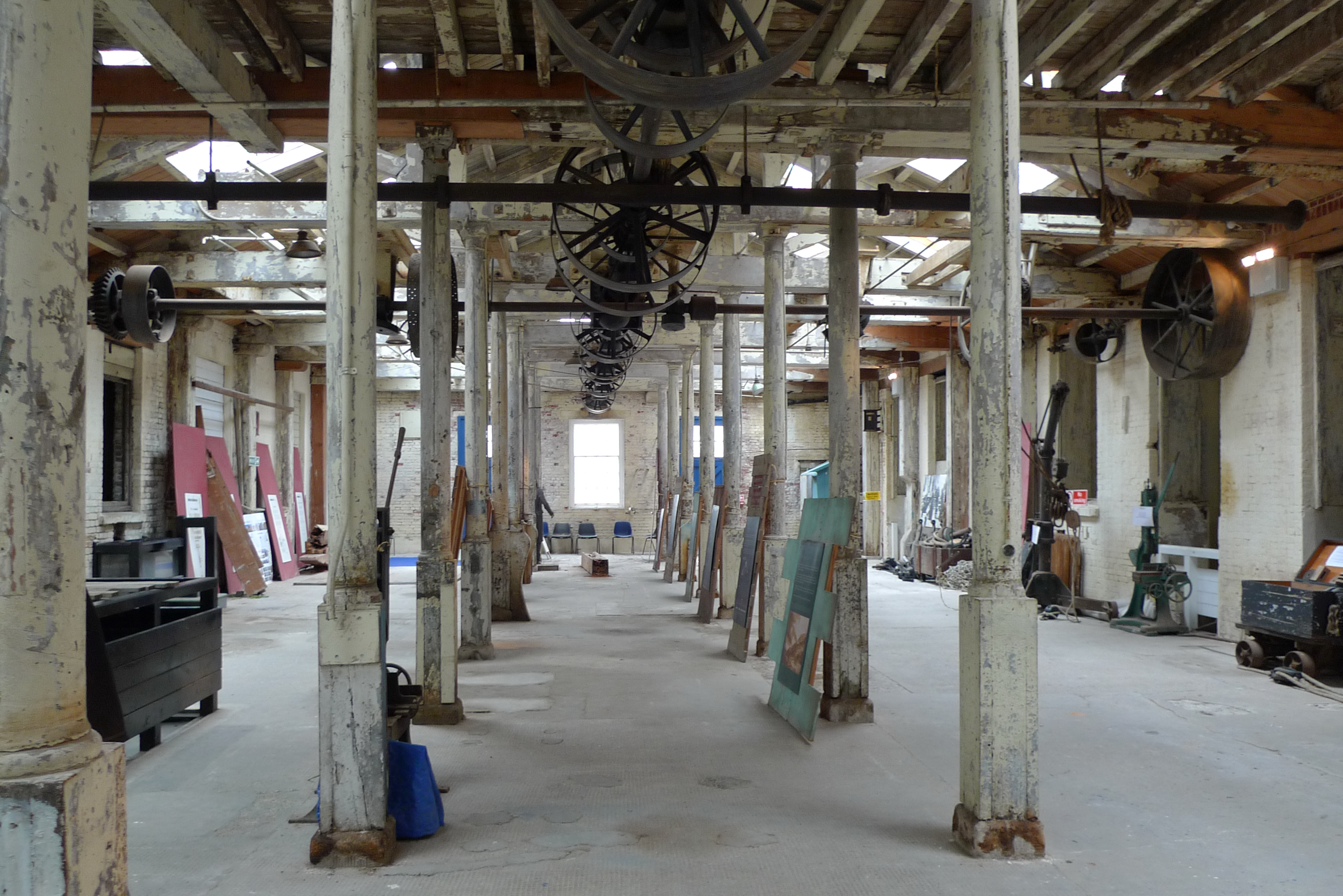
Interior of the Block Mills, showing the overhead belt drive system used to power the manufacturing machinery designed and patented by Marc Isambard Brunel.

The Royal Navy had evolved with Britain's development by the middle of the eighteenth century into what has been described as the greatest industrial power in the western world. The Admiralty and Navy Board began a programme of modernisation of dockyards at Portsmouth and Plymouth such that by the start of the war with Revolutionary France they possessed the most up-to-date fleet facilities in Europe.

The dock system at Portsmouth has its origins in the work of Edmund Dummer in the 1690s. He constructed a series of basins and wet and dry docks. Alterations were made to these in the course of the eighteenth century. One of the basins had become redundant by 1770 and it was proposed to use this as a sump into which all the water from the other facilities could drain. The water was pumped out by a series of horse-operated chain pumps.

In 1795, Brigadier-General Sir Samuel Bentham was appointed by the Admiralty, the first (and only) Inspector General of Naval Works with the task of continuing this modernisation, and in particular the introduction of steam power and mechanising the production processes in the dockyard. His office employed several specialists as his assistants — mechanists (engineers), draughtsmen, architects, chemists, clerks, and others. The Inspector General's office was responsible for the introduction at Portsmouth of a plant for the rolling of copper plates for sheathing ship's hulls and for forging-mills for the production of metal parts used in the construction of vessels. They also introduced similar modernisation at the other Naval dockyards in conjunction with M I Brunel and Maudslay.

By 1797 work had started on building additional dry docks and on deepening the basins, and Bentham realised that the existing drainage system would not cope with the increased demand. He installed a steam engine designed by a member of his staff, James Sadler, in 1798 which, as well as working the chain pumps, drove woodworking machinery and a pump to take water from a well round the dockyard for fire-fighting purposes. This well was some 400 ft (120 m) away and the pumps operated by a horizontal reciprocating wooden spear housed in a tunnel running from the engine house to the top of the well. The Sadler engine was a house-built table engine installed in a single-storey engine house with integral boiler; it replaced one of the horse-drives to the chain pumps. This engine was replaced in 1807 in the same house by another, more powerful, table engine made by Fenton, Murray and Wood of Leeds and, in turn, in 1830 by a Maudslay beam engine.

In 1800 a Boulton and Watt beam engine was ordered as back-up and was housed in a three-storey engine house in line with the Sadler engine house. This engine was replaced in 1837 by another engine made by James Watt and Co.

Space was very tight and expansion of manufacturing facilities was not possible, so by 1802 the drainage basin was filled with two tiers of brick vaults—the lower layer to act as the reservoir, the upper layer as storage, and the roof of the latter being level with the surrounding land, so creating more space. This allowed the construction of two parallel ranges of three-storey wood mills, the southern to incorporate both engine houses and their chimney stacks, the chain pumps and some wood working machinery. The northern range was directly over the vaults and was to house more woodworking machinery. The buildings were designed by Samuel Bunce, the architect of Bentham's staff.

While the vaults were under construction Bentham was ordering woodworking machinery of his own design, mostly up-and-down saws and circular saws. These were fitted-up in both ranges, the power to drive them being transmitted from the engines to the north range by underdrives through the upper layer of vaults, and then by vertical shafts to the upper floors of the buildings. The final drives to the machines was by flat belts running on pulleys.

This machinery was planned to cut timber for the numerous smaller parts used in shipbuilding, especially joinery, which had previously been cut by hand, such as components for tables and benches, as well as small turned goods like belaying pins. There is evidence that he had developed a rotary wood-planing machine but details of this are obscure. There is also evidence that the complex housed a pipe boring machine, whereby straight elm trees were bored out for pump dales. These could be up to 40 feet (12 m) long and were fitted through the decks of a vessel to pump seawater to the deck. There was a machine for making treenails—long wooden dowels used for fixing wooden parts of a ship together.

== Blocks ==
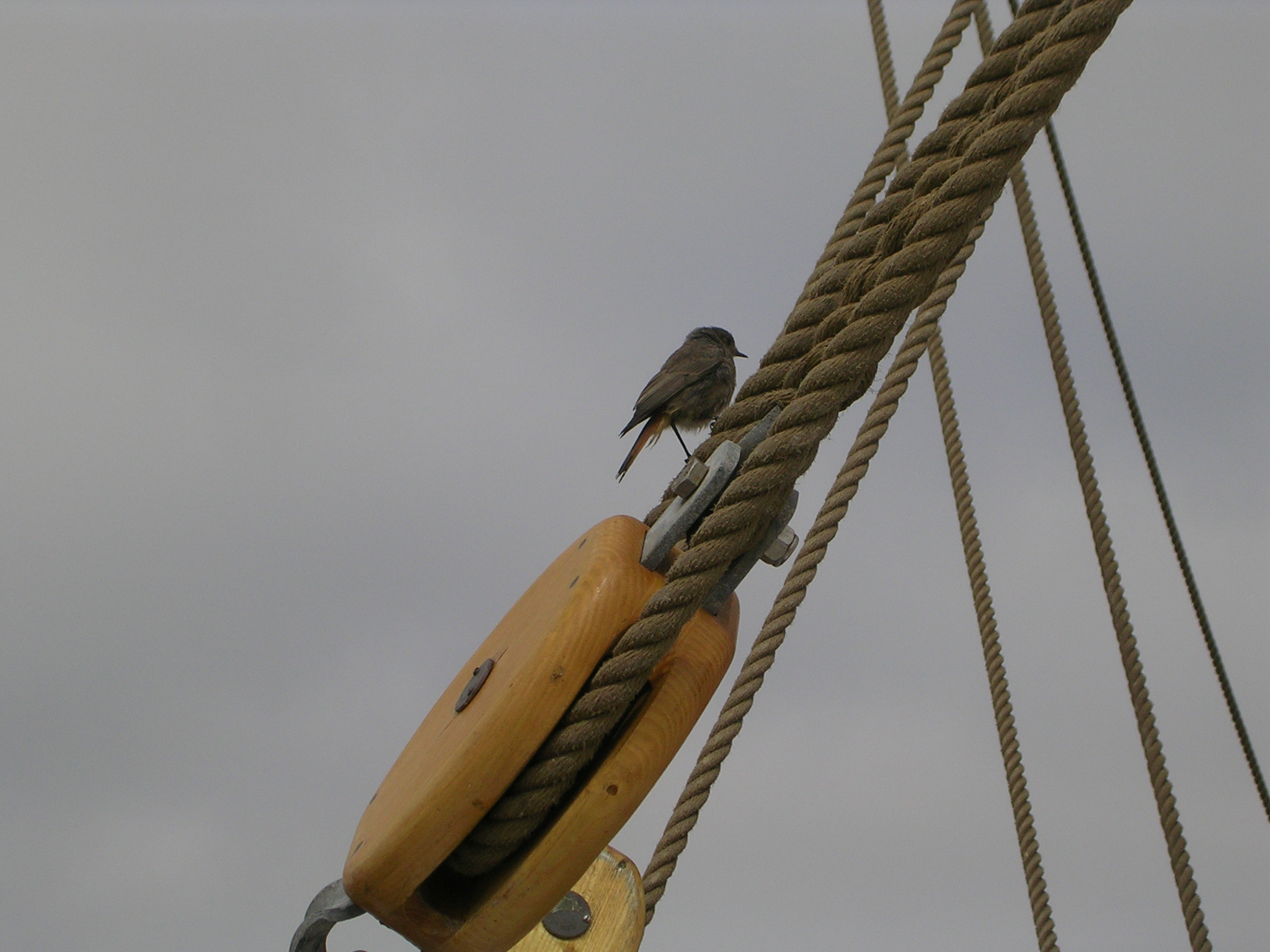
A wooden block

The Royal Navy used large numbers of blocks, which were all hand-made by contractors. Their quality was not consistent, the supply problematic and they were expensive. A typical ship of the line needed about 1000 blocks of different sizes, and in the course of the year the Navy required over 100,000. Bentham had devised some machines for making blocks, but did not develop them and details of how they worked are now obscure. In 1802 Marc Isambard Brunel proposed to the Admiralty a system of making blocks using machinery he had patented. Bentham appreciated the superiority of Brunel's system and in August 1802 he was authorised by the Admiralty to proceed.

There were three series of block-making machines, each designed to make a range of block sizes. They were laid out to allow a production line, so each stage of the work progressed to the next in a natural flow. The yard between the two wood mill buildings was walled-off and roofed to form a new workshop to house the block-making machines. The first set, for medium blocks, was installed in January 1803, the second set for smaller blocks in May 1803, and the third set for large blocks in March 1805. There were numerous changes of layout and some modification of the plant until in September 1807 the plant was felt able to fulfil all the needs of the Navy: 130,000 blocks were produced in 1808.

== The block-making processes using the machines ==
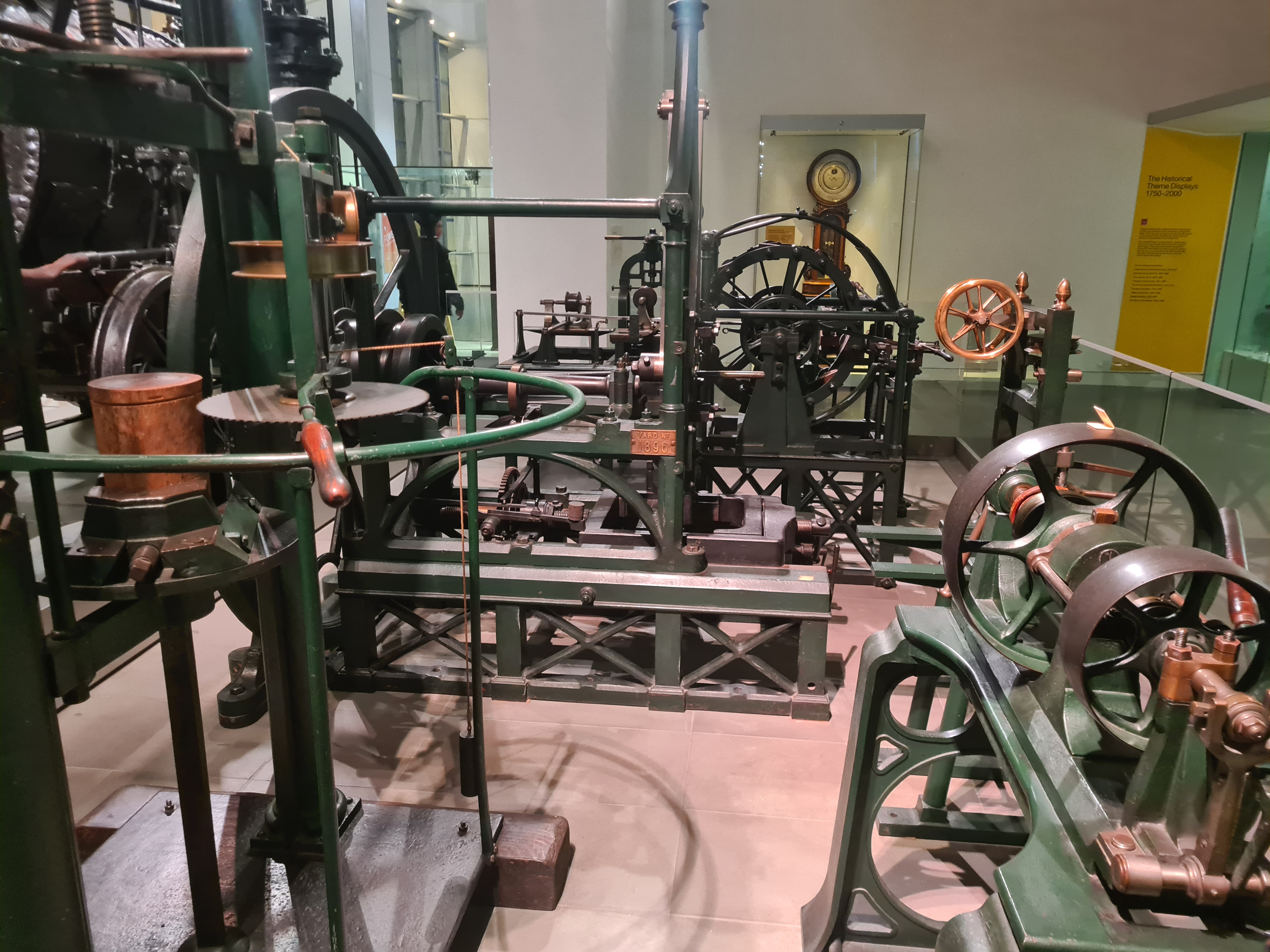
Some of Brunel's machines are preserved in the Science Museum in London (also see below).

The machines were of 22 types and totalled 45. They were driven by two 30 horsepower (22 kW) steam engines. The machines included circular saws, pin turning machines and morticing machines. With these machines 10 men could produce as many blocks as 110 skilled craftsmen.

A pulley-block has four parts: the shell, the sheave, the pin for locating the latter in the shell and a metal bush, or coak, inserted into the sheave to save wear between it and the pin. Blocks can vary in size and in the number of sheaves.

The process of making the shells

- Cut slices from the trunk of a tree, and from these slices by means of the circular saws cut rectangular blocks from which the shells were manufactured.
- Bore a hole in the block for the pin, and at right angles to this a hole or holes to receive the morticing chisels (depending on the number of mortices). The clamp used to hold the block at the same time indented locating points by which the blocks were secured in the later machines, thus ensuring consistent location and measurement in the subsequent processes.
- Mortice the blocks by a self-acting machine. The morticing chisel reciprocated vertically, and at the same time the vice gripping the block was gradually moved each cut. Once the length of the mortice had been cut the machine automatically stopped to allow the block to be replaced with a new one.
- Cut the corners off the block by a circular saw with angled guides.
- Shape the four faces of the blocks to a shallow curve. This was done by a machine where a number of blocks were clamped in the periphery of a revolving wheel. The cutter was swept in a curve across the faces of the blocks as they rotated. The radius of the curve was controlled by a former. After each cut the blocks were turned 90 degrees to bring up a new face.
- Each block was then placed in a machine which scored a shallow groove, by means of a revolving cutter, to give a location for the securing ropes.
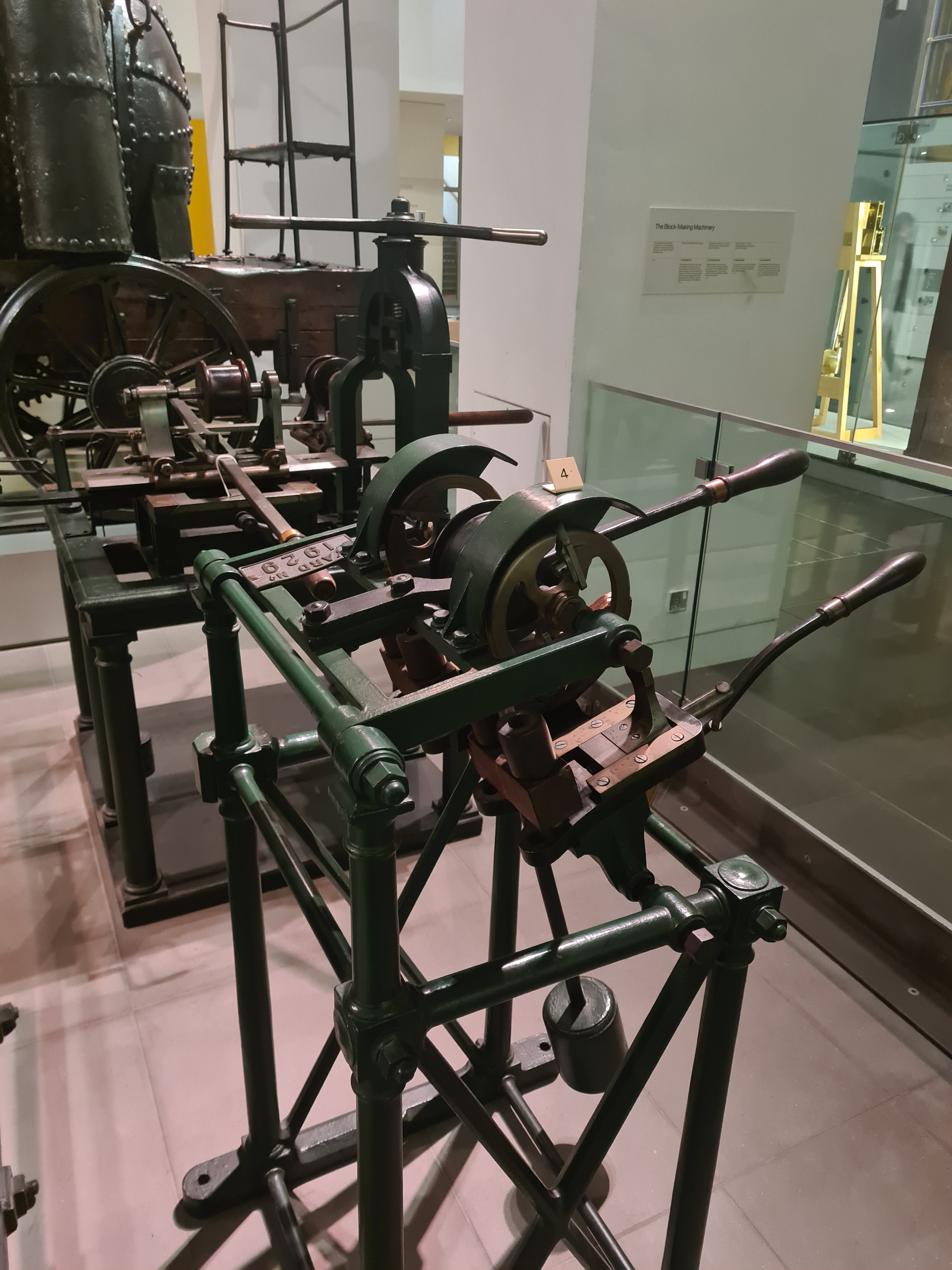
Boring machine (rear)

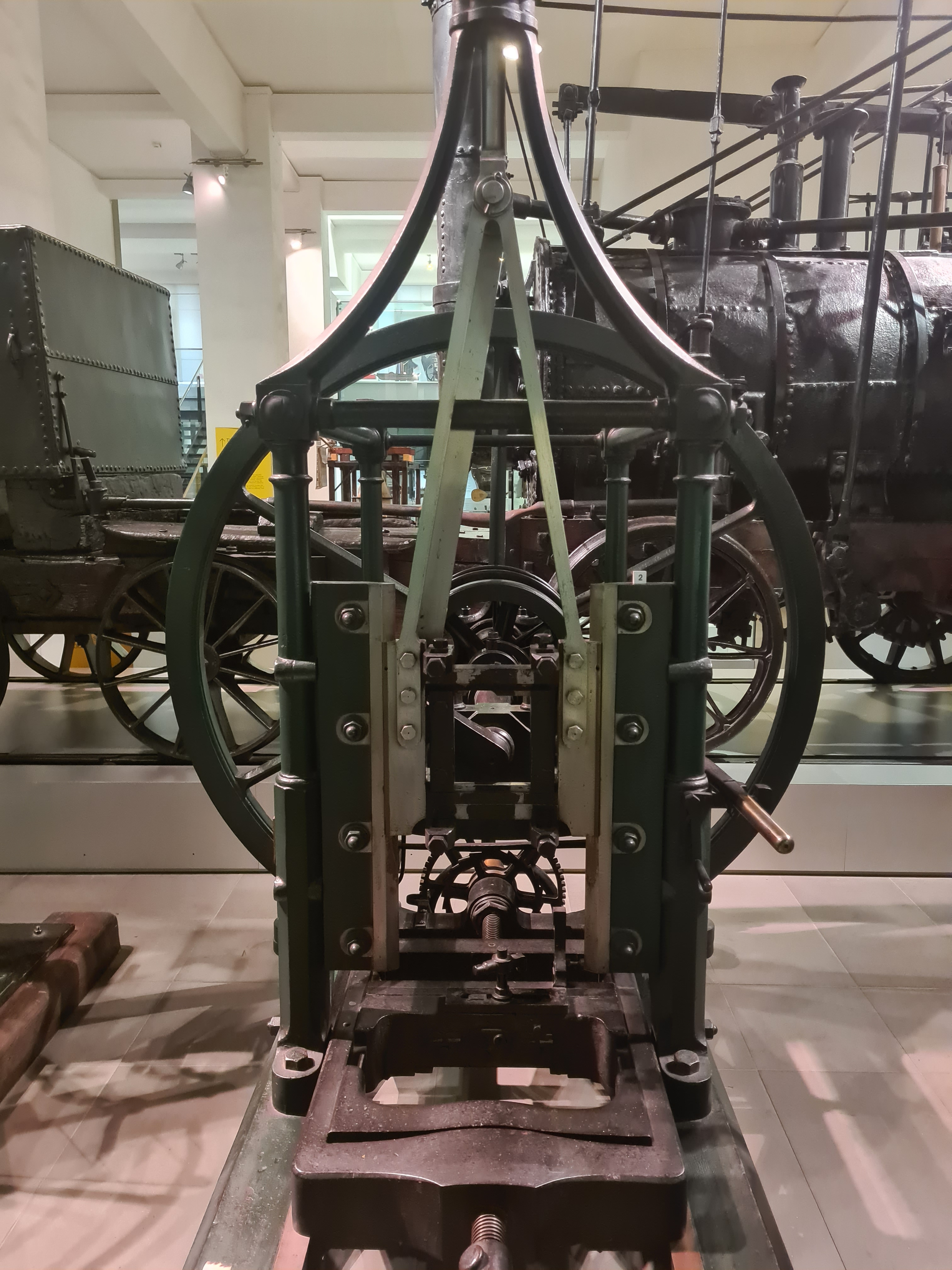
Mortising machine

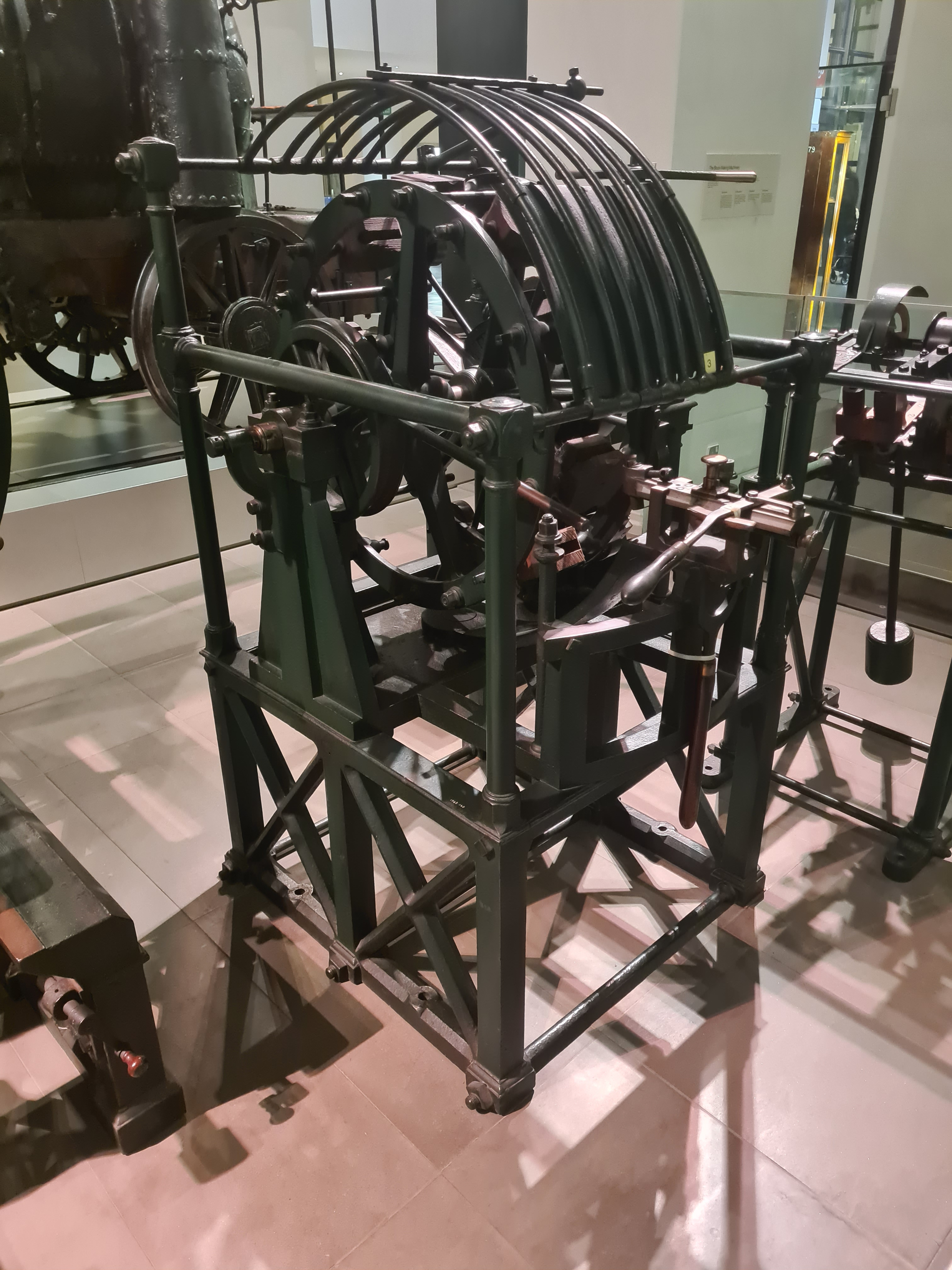
Shaping engine

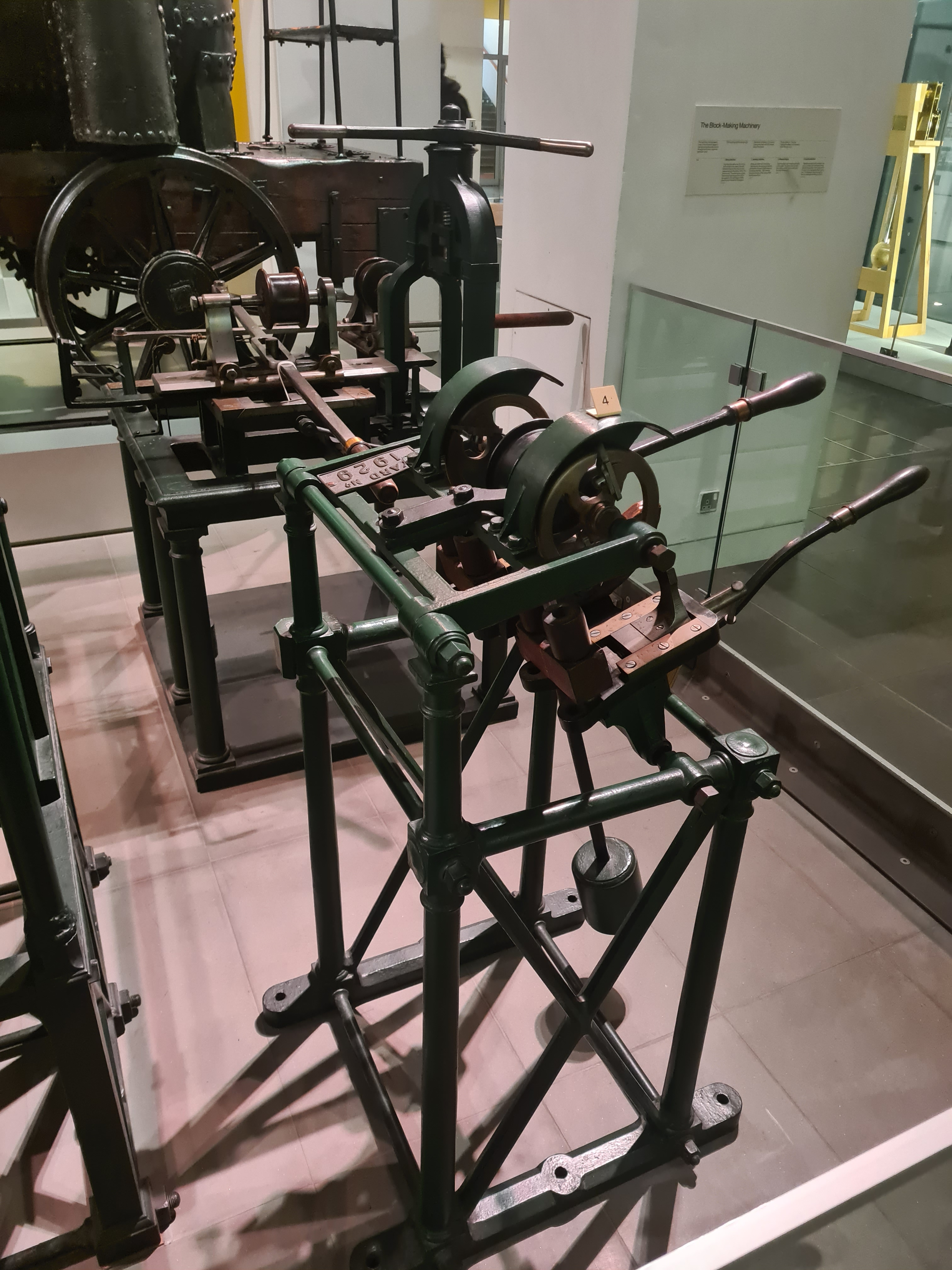
Scoring machine (front)

The process of making the sheaves

- Cut a slice across a trunk of Lignum Vitae. The machine for this allowed the log to be rotated at the same time as the circular saw operated, ensuring that an equal thickness was maintained. The position of the log for each new cut was controlled by a leadscrew ensuring great accuracy.
- Make a circular disc from this slice by means of a rounding saw, which simultaneously bored out the middle and shaped the outer edge.
- Mill out from each face a profile to take the outer face of the coak
- The coak was inserted into the sheave, and a retaining ring rivetted to keep it in place.
- Broach out the hole in the coak to the size of the requisite pin.
- The finished sheave was faced-off on both sides in a special lathe, and the rope groove was machined on the edge.
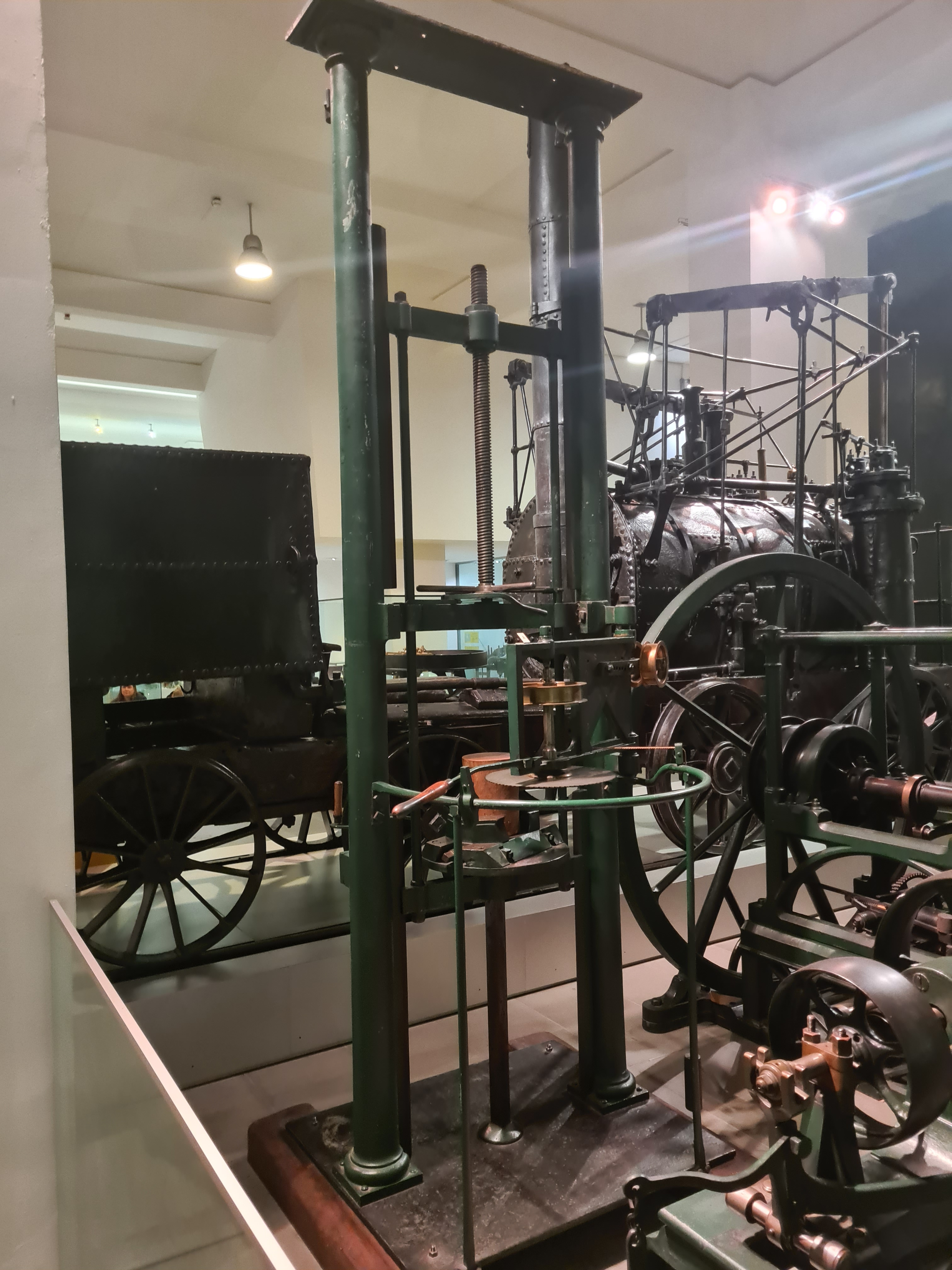
Lignum vitae saw

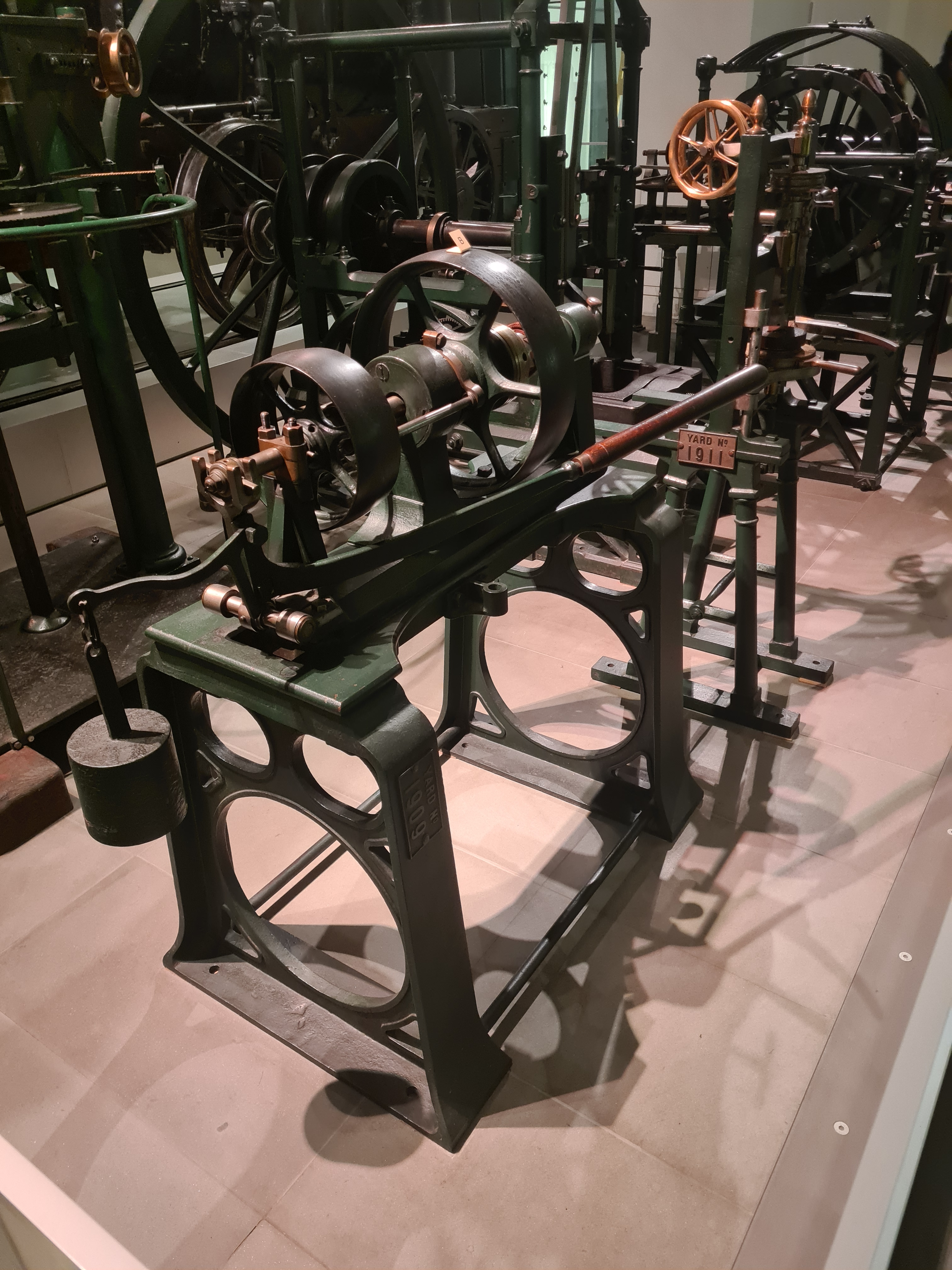
Rounding saw

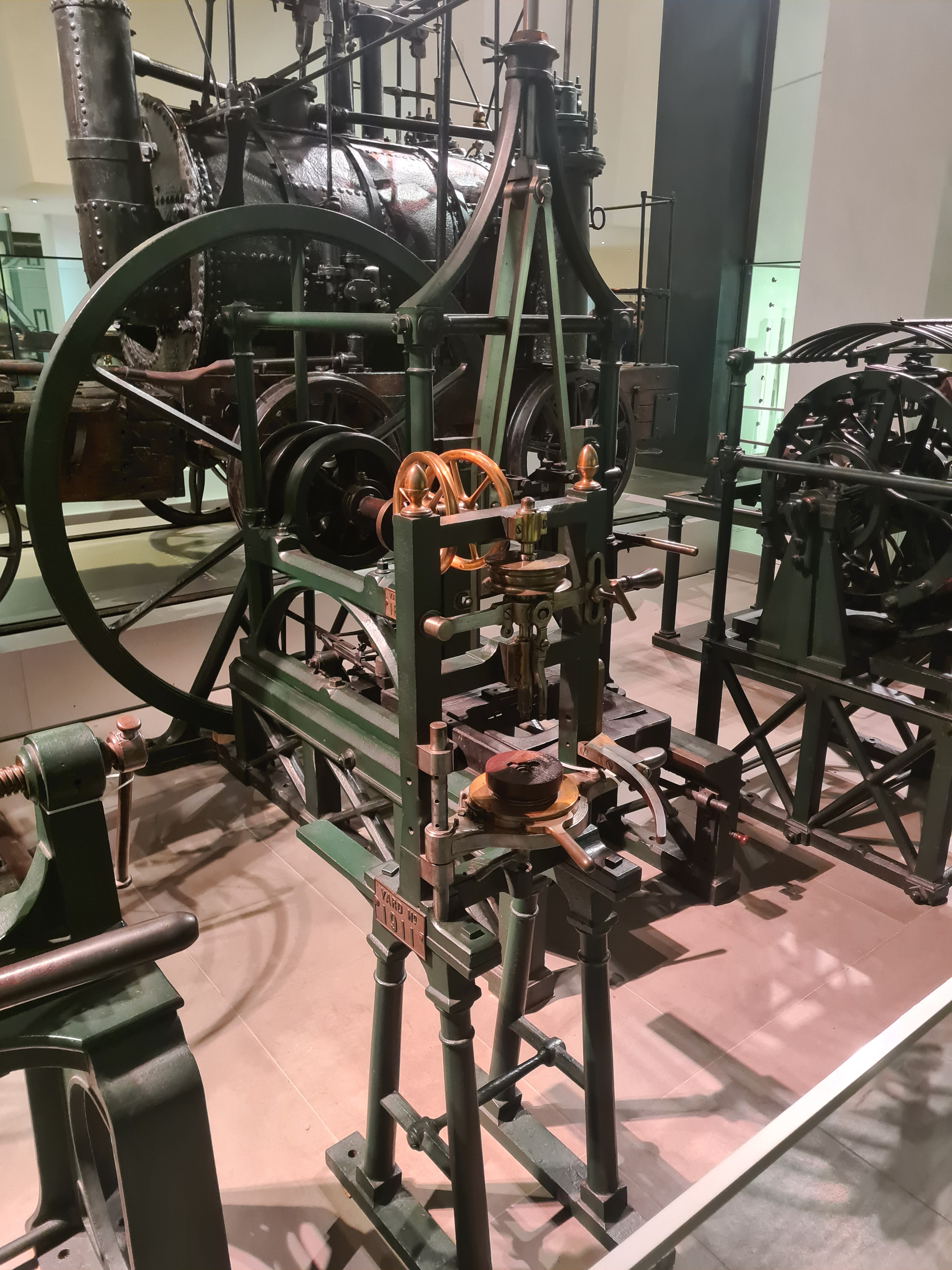
Coaking machine (front)

The process of making the pins

- The pin blanks were forged slightly oversize with a square left on one end.
- They were turned to size on the circular part in a special lathe.
- They were given a burnished finish between hardened dies
- One source says they were then tinned to preserve them from rust.

The process of making the metal coaks

- These were cast in bell-metal and the mould left grease-retaining grooves in the inner bore. One end of the coak had a flange and a loose ring was supplied for the other end, together these parts gave a seating for the rivets which fixed the coak to the sheave.

Assembly process

- The shells were smoothed by hand with a spokeshave and then the sheave and pin assembled. They were stored in the Block Mills and issued as demanded.

== Significant features ==
These machines utilised several features for the first time which have since become commonplace in machine design.

- The boring operation indented gauging points in the wooden blocks which the clamps of the later machines used to locate the blocks precisely. This meant that positioning of the block in later processes ensured accurate location in relation to the tool working on it.
- Several of the machines had cone clutches.
- Brunel used detachable tool bits held in tool holders very similar to those use now on general purpose lathes.
- Expanding collet chucks were used to locate the sheaves by gripping the internal bore, during certain operations.
- Two-jaw gripping chucks were used on some machines. These were precursors of the three-jaw chucks used on lathes today.
- The morticing machines could be set to stop automatically once the operation was finished.
- Interchangeability of the sheaves and pins was possible, since they were not married to a particular shell.
- The work-flow is perhaps best described as batch production, because of the range of block sizes demanded. But it was basically a production-line system, nevertheless. This method of working did not catch on in general manufacturing in Britain for many decades, and when it did it was imported from America.
- The entire system was designed to be worked by labourers and not apprentice-trained craftsmen. Each man was trained to operate two or more machines and could be moved round the plant as required.

== The manufacture of the block-making machines ==
Brunel's patent specification shows wooden framed machines, which, while they show many of the principles of the machines actually installed bear little resemblance to the final designs. The machines submitted by Brunel to the Admiralty for evaluation are now in the National Maritime Museum. Once the contract with the Admiralty had been placed Bentham engaged Henry Maudslay to make them, and it is clear the final designs had considerable input from Bentham, Maudslay, Simon Goodrich, (mechanician to the Navy board) as well as Brunel himself. Due to Bentham's absence in Russia, it was Goodrich who actually brought the block mills into full production. Brunel's payment was based on the saving the Navy made with the new system.

These machines were almost entirely hand made, the only machine tools used being lathes to machine circular parts, and drilling machines for boring small holes. At that time there were no milling, planing or shaping machines, and all flat surfaces were made by hand chipping, filing and scraping. There is evidence that the grinding of flats was also done to get near-precision finishes. Each nut was made to fit its matching bolt and were numbered to ensure they were replaced correctly. This was before the days of interchangeability, of course. The materials used were cast and wrought iron, brass and gun metal. The use of metal throughout their construction greatly improved their rigidity and accuracy which became the standard for later machine tool manufacture.

== Publicity ==
These machines and the block mills attracted an enormous amount of interest from the time of their erection, ranging from Admiral Lord Nelson on the morning of the day he embarked from Portsmouth for the Battle of Trafalgar on 1805, to the Princess Victoria at the age of 12, as part of her education. Even during the time of the Napoleonic Wars, until 1815 there was a stream of foreign dignitaries and military men wishing to learn. The machines were fully described and illustrated in the Edinburgh Encyclopædia (1811), Rees's Cyclopædia, (1812), the supplement to the 4th edition of Encyclopædia Britannica (1817) and the Encyclopædia Metropolitana. Later encyclopaedias such as Tomlinson's Encyclopaedia and the Penny Cyclopaedia derived their accounts from these earlier publications.

These accounts concentrated almost entirely on the blockmaking machinery, and ignored the saw-milling side of the mills, and in consequence modern commentators have not discussed this aspect of the Block Mills. The sawmills were important since Brunel was enabled to develop his ideas which he employed later in his private veneer mill at Battersea, and the Royal Navy sawmills at Woolwich Dockyard and Chatham Dockyard, as well as mills he designed for private concerns, such as Borthwick's at Leith in Scotland.

== Later history ==
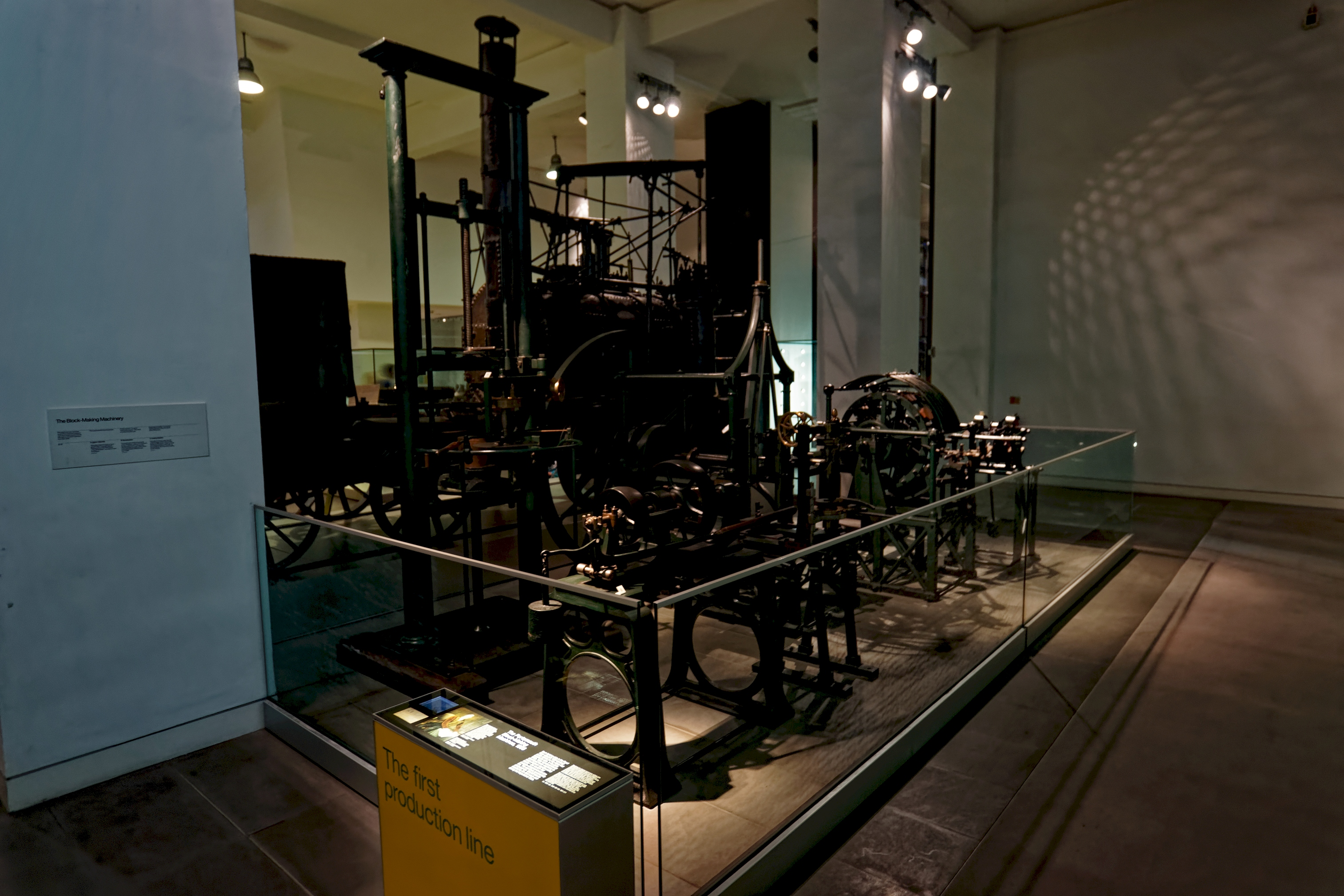
Machinery from the Block Mills presented as 'The first production line' in the Science Museum, London.

The Block Mills have remained in constant Navy occupation ever since and in consequence are not open to the public. Manufacture of blocks using these machines naturally declined over the years, production finally stopping in the 1960s, but some of the original machines, part of the transmission drives and the engine-house shells still survive in the buildings. The National Museum of Science and Industry, London, has a selection of machines, donated by the Admiralty between 1933 and 1951, and others are on display in the Dockyard Apprentice Museum at Portsmouth. Several websites claim that the Smithsonian Institution in Washington, D.C. also has machines from Portsmouth: this is a myth, according to the Institution.

The Block Mills have not been in use for many years, although a lot of the original pulley systems remain in situ, albeit in a poor state of repair. The building is also in a poor state of repair and is a high priority for both English Heritage and the Ministry of Defence. As of 2006 a project is under way to ensure the building and contents are preserved, if not restored.

== See also ==
- Grade I listed buildings in Hampshire
