= Henry Maudslay =

English inventor and machine tool innovator (1771–1831)

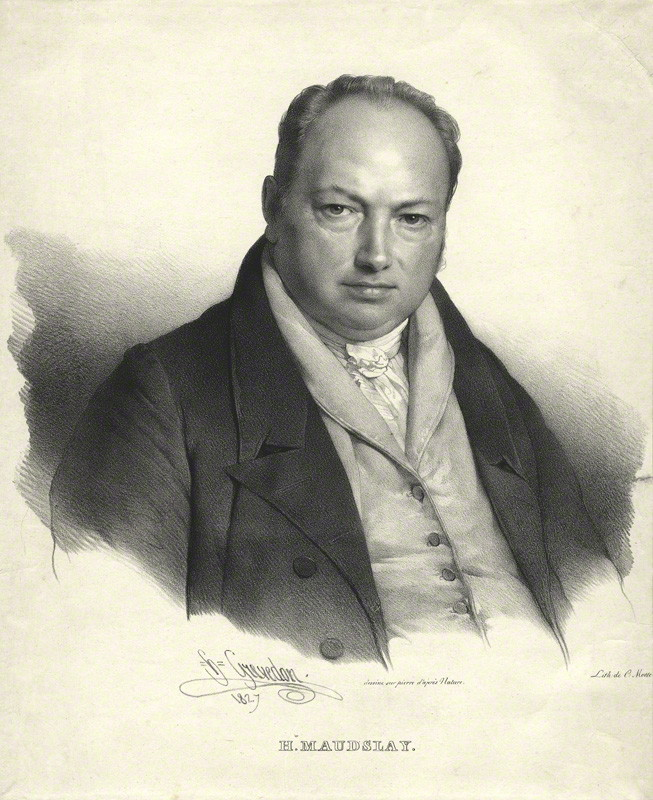
- Portrait by Pierre Louis ('Henri') Grevedon 1827
- Born: 22 August 1771; Woolwich, London (then Kent), England
- Died: 14 February 1831 (aged 59); Lambeth, London, England
- Engineering career
- Significant advance: Machine tool technology

Henry Maudslay (pronunciation and spelling) (22 August 1771 – 14 February 1831) was an English machine tool innovator, tool and die maker, and inventor. He is considered a founding father of machine tool technology. His inventions were an important foundation for the Industrial Revolution.

Maudslay's invention of a metal lathe to cut metal, circa 1800, enabled the manufacture of standard screw thread sizes. Standard screw thread sizes allowed interchangeable parts and the development of mass production.

== Early life ==
Maudslay was the fifth of seven children of Henry Maudslay, a wheelwright in the Royal Engineers, and Margaret (nee Whitaker), the young widow of Joseph Laundy. His father was wounded in action and so in 1756 became an 'artificer' at the Royal Arsenal, Woolwich (then in Kent), where he remained until 1776 and died in 1780. The family lived in an alley that no longer exists, off Beresford Square, between Powis Street and Beresford Street.

== Career ==
Maudslay began work at the age of 12 as a "powder monkey", one of the boys employed in filling cartridges at the Arsenal. After two years, he was transferred to a carpenter's shop followed by a blacksmith's forge, where at the age of fifteen he began training as a blacksmith. He seems to have specialised in the latter, more complex kind of forge work. During his time at the Arsenal, Maudslay also worked at the Royal Foundry, where Jan Verbruggen had installed an innovative horizontal boring machine in 1772.

=== Joseph Bramah ===
Maudslay acquired such a good reputation that Joseph Bramah called for his services on the recommendation of one of his employees. Bramah was surprised that he was only eighteen, but Maudslay demonstrated his ability and started work at Bramah's workshop in Denmark Street, St Giles.

==== Bramah lock ====
Bramah designed and patented an improved type of lock based on the tumbler principle, but had difficulty manufacturing at an economic price. Maudslay built the lock that was displayed in Bramah's shop window with a notice offering a reward of 200 guineas to anyone who could pick it. It resisted all efforts for 47 years. Maudslay designed and made a set of special tools and machines that allowed the lock to be made at an economic price.

==== Hydraulic press ====
Bramah had designed a hydraulic press, but was having problems sealing both the piston and the piston rod where it fitted into the cylinder. The usual method was hemp packing but the pressures were too high for this to work. Maudslay came up with the idea of a leather cup washer, which gave a perfect seal but offered no resistance to movement when the pressure was released. The new hydraulic press worked perfectly thereafter. But Maudslay, who had made a major contribution to its success, received little credit for it.

==== Screw cutting lathe ====
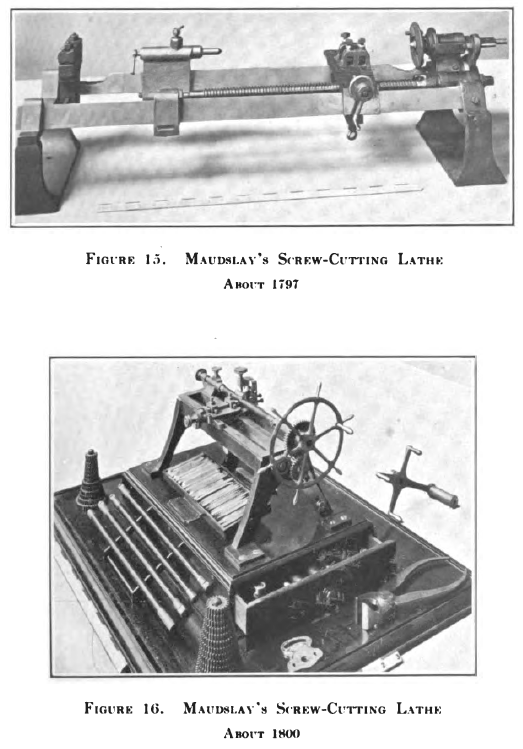
Maudslay's early screw-cutting lathes of circa 1797 while working for Joseph Bramah, and 1800 in his own business.

Maudslay developed the first industrially practical screw-cutting lathe in 1800, allowing standardisation of screw thread sizes for the first time. This allowed the concept of interchangeable parts (an idea that was already taking hold) to be practically applied to nuts and bolts.

When Maudslay began working for Bramah, the typical lathe was worked by a treadle and the workman held the cutting tool against the work. This did not allow for precision, especially in cutting iron, so screw threads were usually made by chipping and filing (that is, with skilled freehand use of chisels and files). Nuts were rare; metal screws, when made at all, were usually for use in wood. Metal bolts passing through wood framing to a metal fastening on the other side were usually fastened in non-threaded ways (such as clinching or upsetting against a washer).

Maudslay designed a tool holder into which the cutting tool would be clamped, and which would slide on accurately planed surfaces to allow the cutting tool to move in either direction. The slide rest was positioned by a leadscrew to which power was transmitted through a pair of changeable gears so that it traveled in proportion to the turning of the work. This allowed screw threads to be precisely cut. Changing the gears gave various pitches. The ability of the slide-rest lathe to produce precision parts revolutionised the production of machine components. He standardized the screw threads used in his workshop and produced sets of taps and dies that would make nuts and bolts consistently to those standards, so that any bolt of the appropriate size would fit any nut of the same size. This was a major advance in workshop technology.

Maudslay did not invent the slide-rest (as others such as James Nasmyth have claimed), and may not have been the first to combine a lead screw, slide-rest, and set of change gears all on one lathe (Jesse Ramsden may have done that in 1775; evidence is scant), but he did introduce the three-part combination of lead screw, slide rest, and change gears, sparking a great advance in machine tools and in the engineering use of screw threads.

Maudslay's original screw-cutting lathe is at the Science Museum in London.

==== Promotion and ambition ====
Maudslay had shown himself to be so talented that after one year the nineteen-year-old was made manager of Bramah's workshop.

=== Henry Maudslay and Company ===
In 1797, after having worked for Bramah for eight years, Maudslay was refused a wage increase to 30 shillings a week so he decided to set up his own business. In 1798 he obtained a small shop and smithy in Wells Street, off Oxford Street. In 1800 he moved to larger premises in Margaret Street, Cavendish Square.

By 1810, Maudslay was employing 80 workers and running out of room at his workshop, hence moved to larger premises in Westminster Bridge Road, Lambeth. Maudslay also recruited a promising young Admiralty draughtsman, Joshua Field, who proved to be so talented that Maudslay took him into partnership. The company later became Maudslay, Sons and Field when Maudslay's sons became partners.

==== Block making machines ====
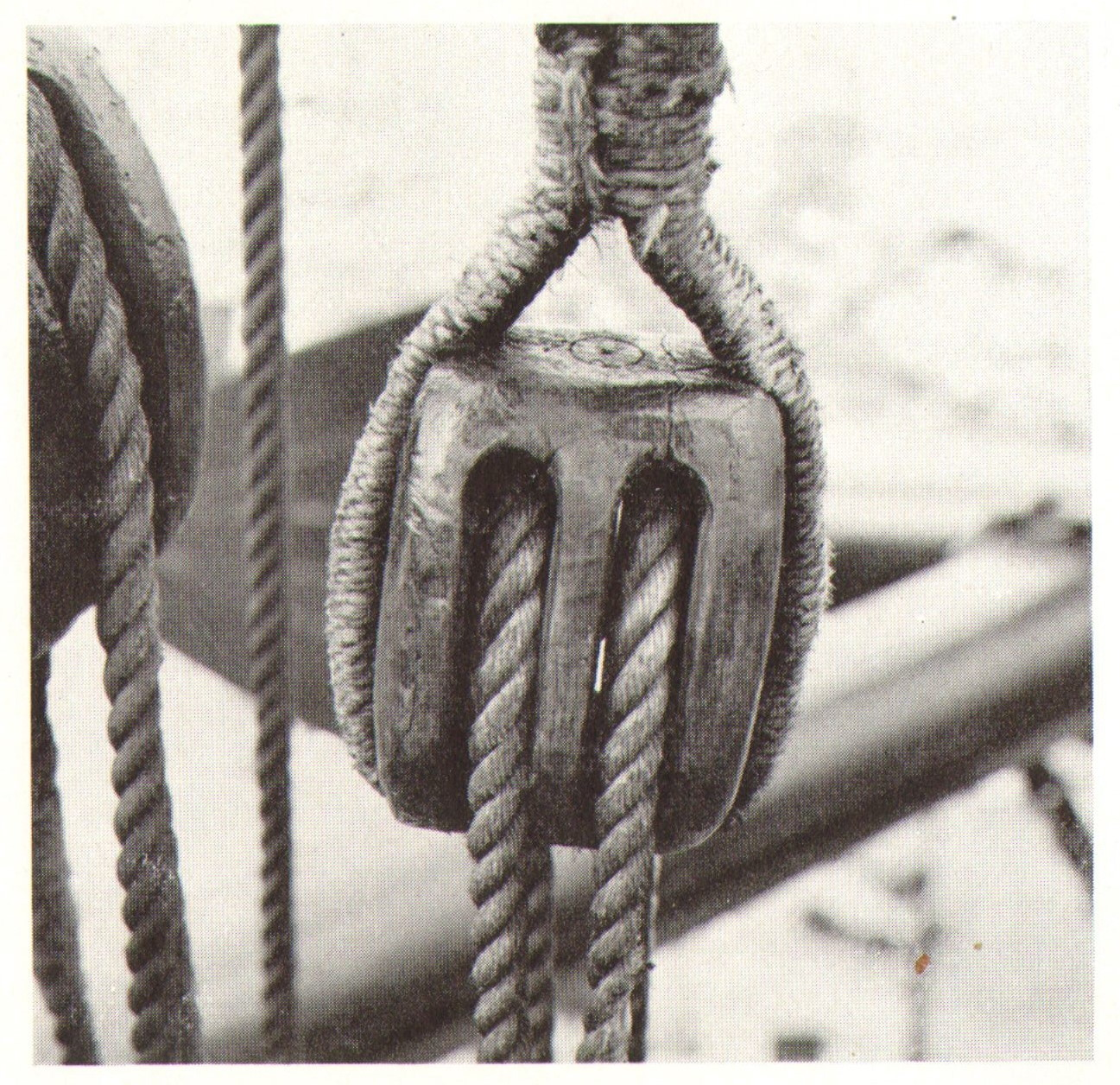
Rigging block from HMS Victory

Following earlier work by Samuel Bentham, his first major commission was to build a series of 42 woodworking machines to produce wooden rigging blocks (each ship required thousands) for the Navy under Sir Marc Isambard Brunel. The machines were installed in the purpose-built Portsmouth Block Mills, which still survive, including some of the original machinery. The machines were capable of making 130,000 ships' blocks a year, needing only ten unskilled men to operate them compared with the 110 skilled workers needed before their installation. This was the first well-known example of specialized machinery used for machining in an assembly-line type factory.

==== Micrometer ====
Maudslay invented the first bench micrometer capable of measuring to one ten-thousandth of an inch (0.0001 in ≈ 3 μm). He called it the "Lord Chancellor", as it was used to settle any questions regarding accuracy of workmanship.

==== Marine engines ====
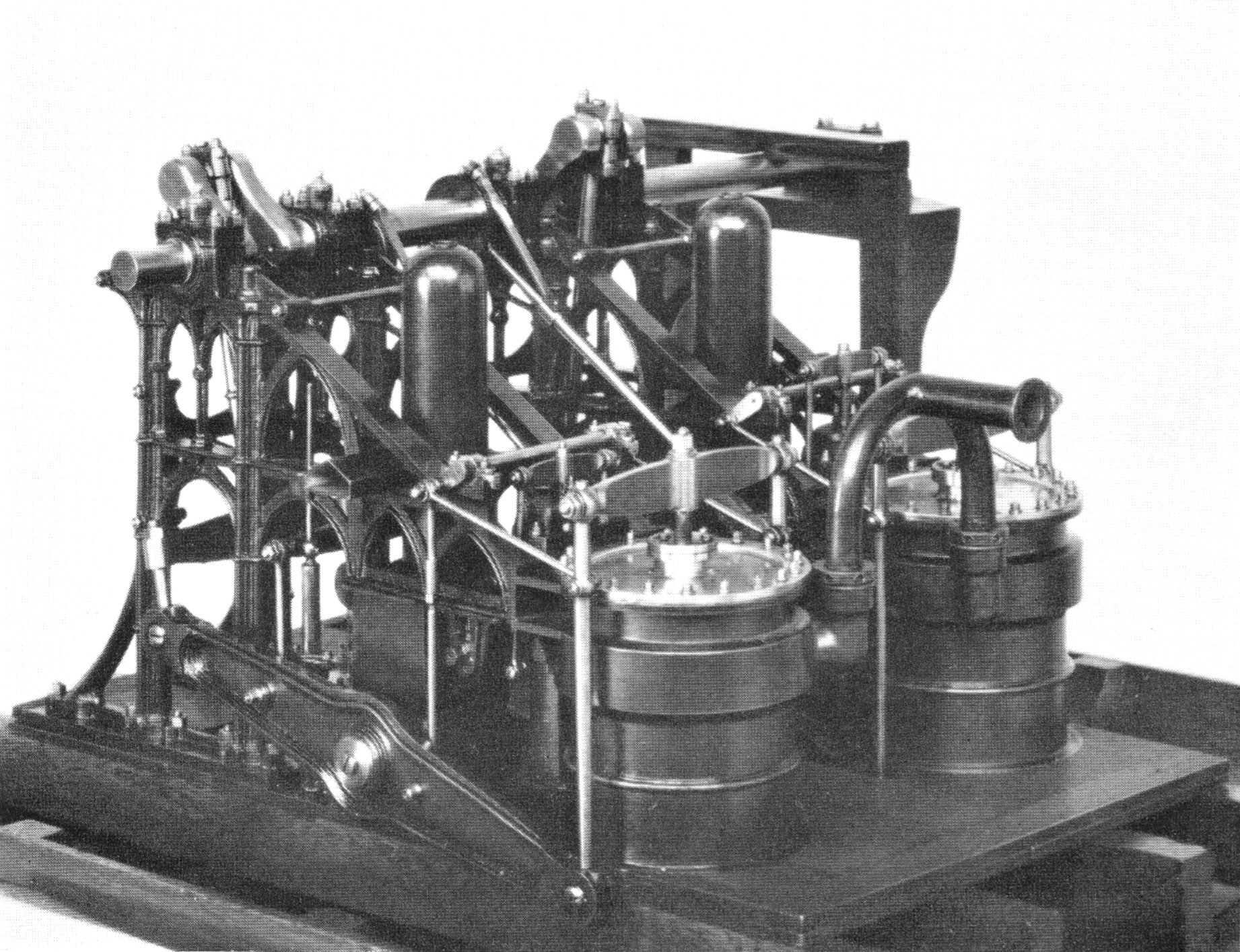
A model of the Maudslay-built twin side-lever engines installed in the 1832 paddle steamer Dee

Maudslay's Lambeth works began to specialize in the production of marine steam engines. The type of engine he used for ships was a side-lever design, in which a beam was mounted alongside the cylinder. This reduced height in the cramped engine rooms of steamers. His first marine engine was built in 1815, of 17 h.p., and fitted to a Thames steamer named the Richmond. In 1823 a Maudslay engine powered the Lightning, the first steam-powered vessel to be commissioned by the Royal Navy. In 1829 a side-lever engine of 400 h.p. completed for HMS Dee was the largest marine engine existing at that time.

The marine engine business was developed by Henry's third son, Joseph Maudslay (1801 - 1861). He had trained in shipbuilding at Northfleet and, with Joshua Field, became a partner in his father's firm, trading as Maudslay, Sons and Field of North Lambeth. In 1838, after Henry's death, the Lambeth works supplied a 750 h.p. engine for Isambard Kingdom Brunel's SS Great Western, the first purpose-built transatlantic steamship. They patented a double cylinder direct acting engine in 1839. They introduced some of the earliest screw propulsion units for ships, including one for the first Admiralty screw steamship, HMS Rattler, in 1841. By 1850 the firm had supplied more than 200 vessels with steam engines, though the firm's dominance was being challenged by John Penn's trunk engine design. They exhibited their engines at the 1862 International Exhibition.

==== Thames Tunnel ====
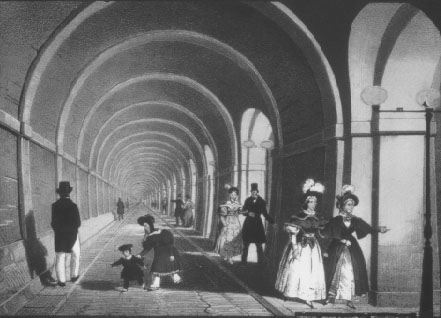
Interior of the Thames Tunnel, mid-19th century

In 1825, Marc Isambard Brunel began work on the Thames Tunnel, intended to link Rotherhithe with Wapping. After many difficulties this first tunnel under the Thames was completed in 1842. The tunnel would not have been possible without the innovative tunneling shield designed by Marc Brunel and built by Maudslay Sons & Field at their Lambeth works. Maudslay also supplied the steam-driven pumps that were important for keeping the tunnel workings dry.

== Personal life ==
In 1791, he married Bramah's housemaid, Sarah Tindel, together they had a daughter Isabel Maudslay and four sons: Thomas Henry, the eldest, and Joseph, the youngest, subsequently joined their father in business. William, the second, became a civil engineer and was one of the founders of the Institution of Civil Engineers.

=== Later life ===
Near the end of his life, Maudslay developed an interest in astronomy and began to construct a telescope. He intended to buy a house in Norwood and build a private observatory there, but died before he was able to accomplish his plan. In January 1831 he caught a chill while crossing the English Channel after visiting a friend in France. He was ill for four weeks and died on 14 February 1831. He was buried in the churchyard of St Mary Magdalen Woolwich; he designed the memorial located in its Lady Chapel.

== Legacy ==
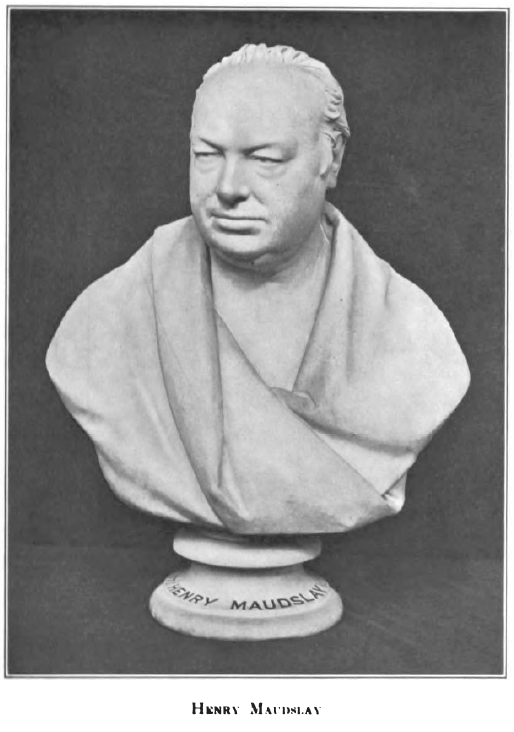
A bust of Maudslay.

Maudslay laid an important foundation for the Industrial Revolution with his machine tool technology. His most influential invention was the screw-cutting lathe. The machine, which created uniformity in screws and allowed for the application of interchangeable parts (a prerequisite for mass production), was a revolutionary development necessary for the Industrial Revolution.

Many outstanding engineers trained in his workshop, including Richard Roberts, David Napier, Joseph Clement, Sir Joseph Whitworth, James Nasmyth (inventor of the steam hammer), Joshua Field. Maudslay played his part in the development of mechanical engineering when it was in its infancy, but he was especially pioneering in the development of machine tools to be used in engineering workshops across the world.

Maudslay's company was one of the most important British engineering manufactories of the nineteenth century, finally closing in 1904.

Many of the tools made by Maudslay are in the collection of the Science Museum, London.

== Pronunciation and spelling ==
In Maudslay's surname, as in other British names with terminal unstressed syllable -ay such as Lindsay or Barclay, the terminal syllable is pronounced as /i/ or a reduction thereof; it therefore sounds the same as "Maudsley" /ˈmɔːdzli/. Many books have spelled his surname with an "e" as "Maudsley"; but this seems to be an error propagated via citation of earlier books containing the same error.

== See also ==
- Maudslay Motor Company, founded by Walter H. Maudslay, great grandson of Henry Maudslay.

== Bibliography ==
- John Cantrell and Gillian Cookson, eds., Henry Maudslay and the Pioneers of the Machine Age, 2002, Tempus Publishing, Ltd, pb., (ISBN 0-7524-2766-0) This is a collection of essays by various specialists, and comprises biographies of Maudslay, Roberts, Napier, Clement, Whitworth, Nasmyth and Muir, as well as an account of the London Engineering Scene at the time of Maudslay, and an account of the firm from the death of Maudslay in 1831 until its demise in 1904.
- Coad, Jonathan, The Portsmouth Block Mills: Bentham, Brunel and the start of the Royal Navy's Industrial Revolution, 2005, ISBN 1-873592-87-6.
- Deane, Phyllis (1965). The First Industrial Revolution. Cambridge University Press. ISBN 9780521093637.
- Roe, Joseph Wickham (1916), English and American Tool Builders, New Haven, Connecticut: Yale University Press, LCCN 16011753. Reprinted by McGraw-Hill, New York and London, 1926 (LCCN 27-24075); and by Lindsay Publications, Inc., Bradley, Illinois (ISBN 978-0-917914-73-7).
