= Reginald John Gladstone =

British anatomist and embryologist

Reginald John Gladstone FRSE FRCS LRCP MZS (9 June 1865 – 12 February 1947) was a British anatomist and embryologist. As he suffered from bilateral congenital cataracts his career was limited mainly to educational fields and research. He took a special interest in deformities of the embryo.

== Life ==
He was born on 9 June 1865 in Clapham, the third and youngest son of Dr Thomas H. Gladstone DPH and his wife Matilda Field (daughter of Joshua Field). His father died when he was six and the family then moved to Aberdeen. He studied medicine at Aberdeen University graduating MB CM DPH in 1888.

He undertook his clinical training at Middlesex Hospital as house physician and surgeon. Aberdeen gave him his doctorate (MD) in 1894. In 1895 he became an Anatomy Demonstrator at the hospital and in 1896 became Senior Demonstrator. He made study trips to both Vienna and Vancouver (the latter representing the British Medical Association) to increase his knowledge of embryology.

In 1911 he was elected a Fellow of the Royal Society of Edinburgh. His proposers were Arthur Robinson, Joseph Strickland Goodall, John Cameron, and David Waterston.

In 1912, he married Ida Millicent Field, his first cousin.

In 1913 he moved to King's College, London as a Reader and Lecturer in Anatomy (specialising in Embryology) and stayed there until retiral in 1938. When he first moved here he lived at 22 Regents Park Terrace in London, a fairly prestigious address.

Up until 1941 he lived at 22 Court Lane Gardens in Dulwich, a pleasant rural-ambience suburb of London, but his house was destroyed by a bomb during The Blitz. He then moved to Greenhayes on Sway Road in Brockenhurst.

He died on 12 February 1947.

== Publications ==
- The Journal of Anatomy and Physiology (1915) with others
- The Development of Blood Plasma (1925) co-written with John William Pickering
- The Pineal Organ (1940)
- A Presomite Human Embryo (1941)

Gladstone contributed the article on "The Brain" to Encyclopædia Britannica.

== Family ==
In 1912 he married his first cousin Ida Millicent Field. They had one son and one daughter.
