= Samuel Bentham =

English mechanical engineer and naval architect

Brigadier-General Sir Samuel Bentham
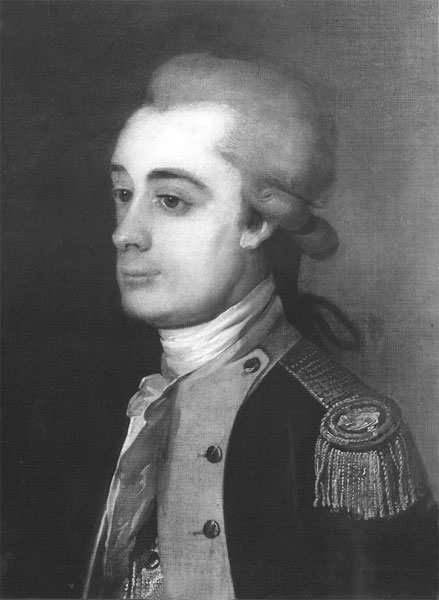
- Born: 11 January 1757; England
- Died: 31 May 1831 (aged 74); London, England
- Spouse: Mary Sophia Fordyce
- Children: George, Clara, Sarah, Mary Louisa
- Relatives: Jeremy Bentham (brother)

Brigadier-General Sir Samuel Bentham (11 January 1757 – 31 May 1831) was an English mechanical engineer and naval architect credited with numerous innovations, particularly related to naval architecture, including weapons. He was the only surviving sibling of philosopher Jeremy Bentham, with whom he had a close bond.

== Early life ==
Samuel Bentham was one of two surviving children of Jeremiah Bentham. His father was an attorney, and his older brother was the philosopher Jeremy Bentham, five other siblings having died in infancy or early childhood, and their mother dying in 1766. At the age of 14, Bentham was apprenticed to a shipwright at Woolwich Dockyard, serving there and at Chatham Dockyard, before completing his 7-year training at the Naval Academy in Portsmouth.

== Career ==
=== Russia ===
In 1780 he moved to Russia, where he was employed in the service of Prince Potemkin, who had an establishment designed to promote the introduction of various arts of civilization. Initially hired as a shipbuilder, he soon discovered other opportunities to use his talents as an engineer and inventor, constructing industrial machinery and experimenting with steel production. He also designed and constructed many novel inventions, including an amphibious vessel and an articulated barge built for Catherine the Great, and the first Panopticon.

He was also decorated for his part in a decisive victory in the war against the Turks, and commanded a battalion of 1,000 men in Siberia. He eventually came to have complete responsibility for Potemkin's factories and workshops, and it was while considering the difficulties of supervising the large workforce that he devised the principle of central inspection, and designed the Panopticon building which would embody that principle and was later popularized by his brother Jeremy.

In 1782 Bentham travelled along the Siberian Route to China, visiting Kyakhta and its Chinese pendant Naimatchin, and then spending over a month at the border fluvial city of Nerchinsk, where he was able to study Chinese ship designs, particularly those of junks. Back in Europe, he campaigned for the introduction of watertight compartments, an idea which he acknowledged he had got from seeing large Chinese vessels in Siberia.

Samuel returned to England in 1791, and for the next few years was involved with his brother Jeremy in trying to promote the Panopticon scheme and he designed machinery for use in it. It was during this period that he met his future wife, Mary Sophia Fordyce, the daughter of Scottish doctor and scientist George Fordyce, a friend of Jeremy Bentham. The two were married in October 1796.

In 1795 the Lords Commissioners of the Admiralty asked him to design six new sailing ships with "partitions contributing to strength, and securing the ship against foundering, as practiced by the Chinese of the present day". These were built by the shipyard of Hobbs & Hellyer at Redbridge, Hampshire, and incorporated a number of other novel features such as interchangeable parts for masts and spars, allowing easy maintenance while at sea. (Note: There were two sloops of the same design, HMS Dart and HMS Arrow, two schooners of the same design, HMS Eling and two HMS Redbridge, and two one-off designs, HMS Milbrook and HMS Netley. Milbrook and Netley in particular captured numerous French and Spanish privateers.)

=== Inspector General of Naval Works ===
In March 1796 Bentham was appointed Inspector General of Naval Works, responsible for the maintaining and improving the Royal dockyards, a post which involved a lot of travel. He produced a great many suggestions for improvements, which included the introduction of steam power to the dockyards and the mechanisation of many production processes. However, his superiors at the Navy Board were resistant to change and many of his suggestions were not implemented.

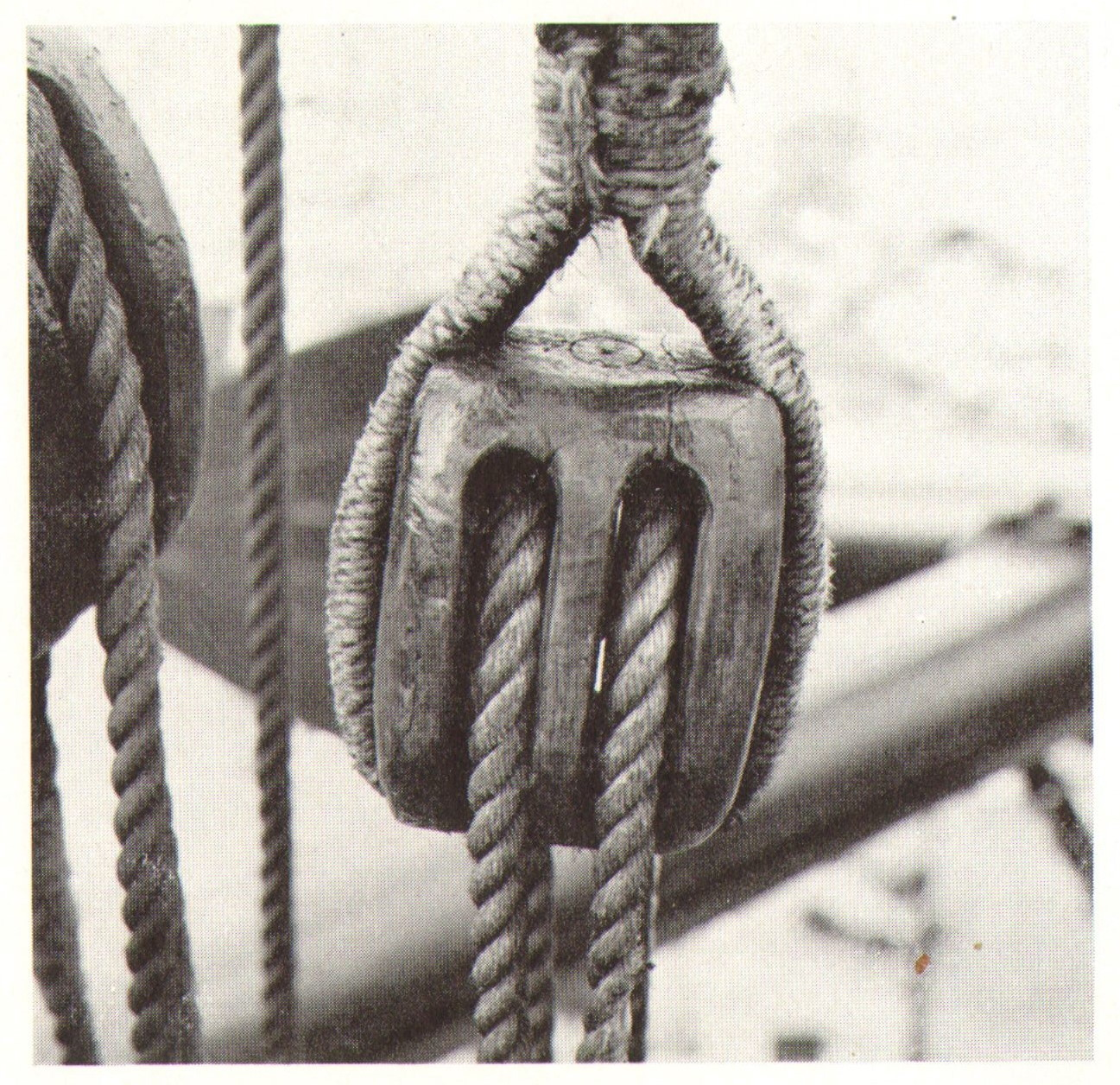
Rigging block from HMS Victory

Bentham is credited with helping to revolutionise the production of the wooden pulley blocks used in ships' rigging, devising woodworking machinery to improve production efficiency. Bentham's 1793 patent for woodworking machinery has been called "one of the most remarkable patents ever issued by the British Patent Office". Fifty years later in a woodworking machinery patent case the Crown Judges said "the specification of his patent of 1793 is a perfect treatise on the subject; indeed the only one worth quoting that has to this day been written on the subject".

Marc Isambard Brunel had independently conceived designs for mortising and boring machines, which he showed to Bentham, who recognized the superiority of Brunel's designs. Henry Maudslay, the mechanic who built the machines, became a prominent machine tool builder. The Portsmouth Block Mills marked the arrival of mass production techniques in British manufacturing.

=== Return to Russia ===
In 1805 Bentham returned to Russia, this time on government business, and remained there for two years with his family, chartering an entire ship to take his establishment, his servants and his companions. Samuel's mission for the British government in Russia was blocked by constant obstacles and he returned home in 1807 without having achieved any of his official objectives. During this time he supervised the construction of a Panopticon School of Arts on the banks of the Okhta River in St. Petersburg, the design which he had first conceived while in Krichev in 1786. The building was destroyed by fire and is known only from drawings.

=== Vauxhall Bridge ===
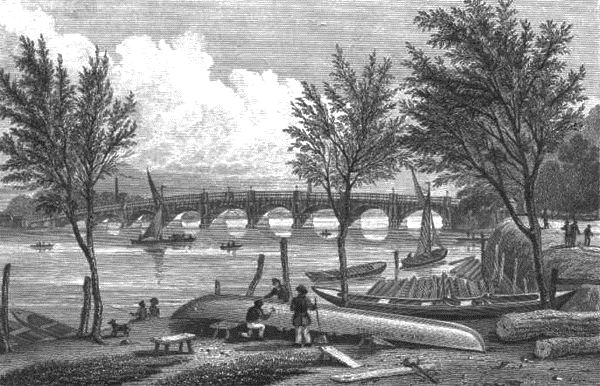
Vauxhall Bridge in 1829.

Bentham also designed a full cast-iron nine-arch bridge for the Butterly company, for Vauxhall Bridge in London, which would have been the first iron-built bridge over the Thames. The choice of cast iron was said to be because it was "cheaper than masonry", but some of the inspiration for the bridge has also been traced to Bentham's experience of China, where numerous such arched iron-cast bridges existed. The design was eventually abandoned after doubts about its quality, in favour of a "cast iron arches on masonry piers" design by James Walker, which was completed in May 1813.

=== France ===
Bentham discovered upon his return to England that his post as Inspector General had been abolished while he was absent, and indeed came to believe that he had been sent to Russia solely to get him out of the way while the post was abolished. In 1814, he and his family relocated to the south of France, where they lived until 1826.

The Bentham family travelled a great deal in France before settling in 1820 at the Château de Restinclières, in the région of Languedoc-Roussillon. Their new house was large, with extensive grounds, and Bentham planned to cultivate the land for profit, with his son George managing most of the operation. Bentham also imported agricultural machinery as yet unknown in France, and installed a complex system of irrigation on his land. They were reasonably prosperous, but eventually returned to England in 1826. One factor in their decision was a threatened lawsuit from neighbouring farmers, who claimed that Bentham's irrigation system was diverting the local water supply.

In England, Bentham spent most of his time writing about naval matters, and conducting experiments on hull shapes. His son George Bentham, born in 1800, became a noted botanist.

== Sources ==
- Gilbert, Keith Reginald (1965). The Portsmouth Block-making Machinery: A Pioneering Enterprise in Mass Production. London: H.M. Stationery Office.
- Roe, Joseph Wickham (1916), English and American Tool Builders, New Haven, Connecticut: Yale University Press, LCCN 16011753. Reprinted by McGraw-Hill, New York and London, 1926 (LCCN 27-24075); and by Lindsay Publications, Inc., Bradley, Illinois, (ISBN 978-0-917914-73-7).
- Skempton, A. W., ed. (2002). A Biographical Dictionary of Civil Engineers in Great Britain and Ireland. Vol. 1. London: Thomas Telford. ISBN 0-7277-2939-X. OCLC 50998738.
- Winfield, Rif (2008). British Warships in the Age of Sail 1793–1817: Design, Construction, Careers and Fates. Seaforth. ISBN 978-1-86176-246-7.
