= Royal Navy during the Victorian Era =

History of the British Navy from 1837 to 1901

Royal Navy
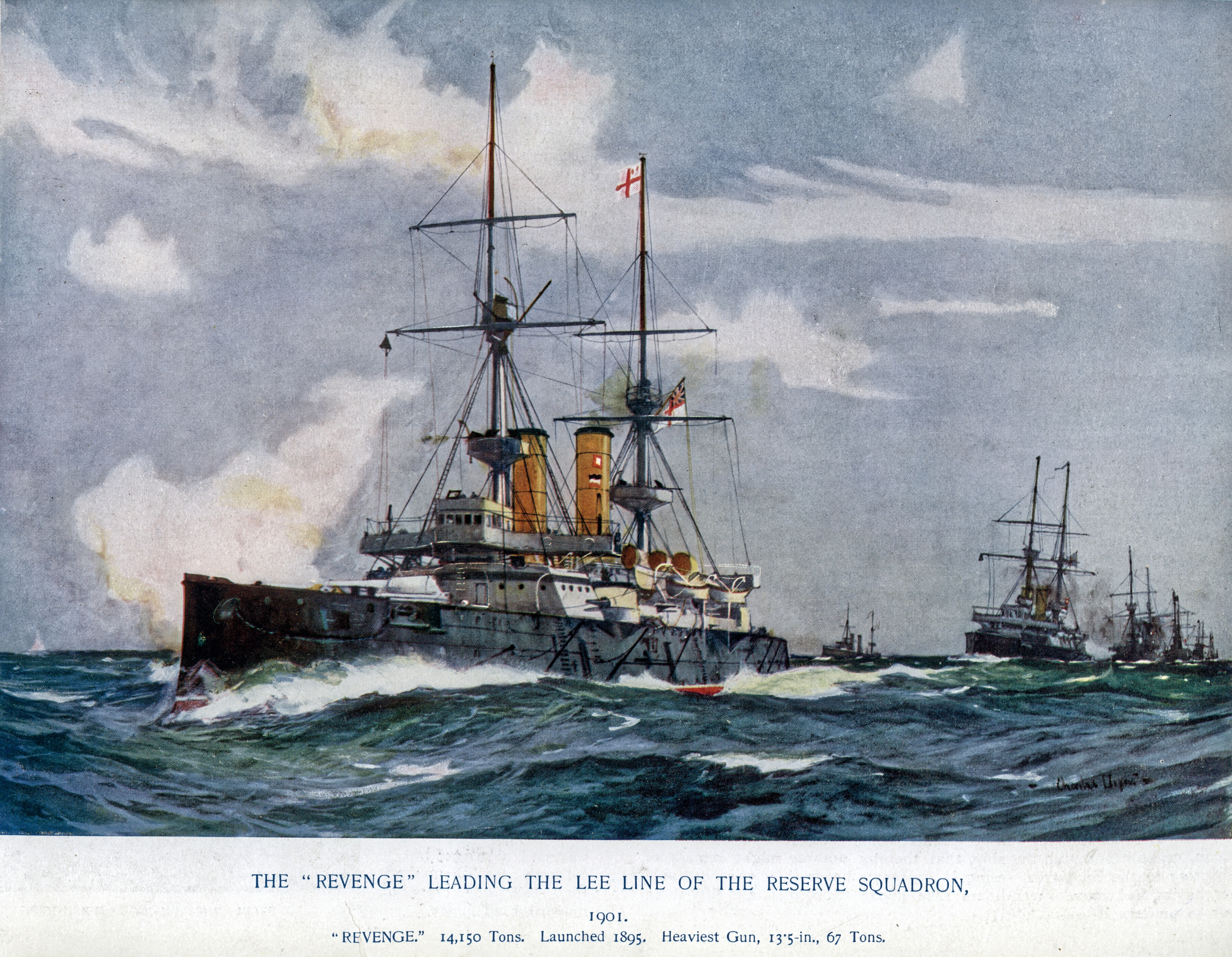
- HMS Revenge, leading the lee line of the Royal Navy Reserve Squadron in 1901.
- Service branches: Royal Marines
- Headquarters: Admiralty, London

Leadership
- First Lord of the Admiralty: Gilbert Elliot-Murray-Kynynmound; Edward St Maur; George Hamilton; George Goschen et al.
- First Sea Lord: Frederick William Grey; Astley Cooper Key; Frederick Richards et al.

Personnel
- Active personnel: 115,000 1900–1901
- Reserve personnel: 40,000 1900–1901

Expenditure
- Budget: £27,522,600 1900–1901

The Royal Navy during the Victorian era (1837–1901) was a period of profound transformation in technology, organization, and social conditions, marking its evolution from a fleet of wooden sailing ships to a modern force of iron and steel warships powered by steam. As Britain's "Rule of the Waves" secured global maritime supremacy, the Royal Navy both shaped and was shaped by a relatively peaceful international climate, often referred to as the Pax Britannica. Life aboard ship underwent significant social change, particularly on the lower decks, as longstanding traditions gave way to new attitudes and reforms. Notably, the abolition of corporal punishment in 1879 signaled a move towards greater discipline and welfare for sailors. Throughout the Victorian era, the Royal Navy not only maintained the security of the British Empire's vast overseas interests but also pioneered advances in naval architecture, engineering, and the management of its diverse and increasingly professional crews.

== Leadership control and organisation ==
When Queen Victoria ascended the throne in 1837, the Royal Navy's administration was centered on the Admiralty, a government department responsible for the command of the Navy. The Admiralty was not administered by a single individual but by a board, known as the Board of Admiralty, which collectively made decisions about naval policy, administration, and operations. The Board was led by the First Lord of the Admiralty, a political appointee who was usually a member of the Cabinet and acted as the civilian head of the Navy. The First Lord was supported by several senior flag officers responsible for the professional and operational aspects of the fleet.

In this period, the professional head of the Board of Admiralty was not a single admiral but rather the First Naval Lord (a title later changed to First Sea Lord), who was responsible to the First Lord of the Admiralty for business relating to the personnel and for the movement and condition of the fleet, and the Junior Naval Lord was his assistant. The Board also included Civil Lords, who handled financial and administrative matters. Below the Board, the Navy was divided into various departments, including the Victualling Department, Department of the Storekeeper-General of the Navy, Department of the Accountant-General of the Navy, Royal Navy Medical Service and the Department of the Surveyor of the Navy. In 1869, the Department of the Storekeeper-General of the Navy was abolished and its responsibilities were assumed by the Third Naval Lord and Controller of the Navy. And in 1872 the Department of the Surveyor of the Navy were replaced by the Department of the Director of Dockyards.

== Units ==
Of the ten principal Commanders-in-Chief, three also functioned as Admirals Superintendents of the United Kingdom's three principal naval ports, overseeing both administrative and operational responsibilities at these key home bases. The remaining seven Commanders-in-Chief were each assigned to one of the great overseas naval stations, where they acted as the head of the station and the squadron attached to it. The command rank at these stations depended on their size and importance, typically being either a Rear-Admiral or Vice-Admiral, and only rarely a full Admiral. The main foreign stations were designated as follows: the Mediterranean, North America and the West Indies, the Pacific, China, Australia, East Indies, Cape of Good Hope and West Coast of Africa, and the South East Coast of America. The Mediterranean, China, and North America and West Indies stations, owing to their significance, were commanded by Vice-Admirals, while others such as the Pacific, Australia, and the Cape of Good Hope were generally under Rear-Admirals. Notably, the South East Coast of America was a smaller command, overseen by a Naval Captain as Senior Officer.

In home waters, the Channel Squadron was especially prominent. Its operational range extended beyond the English Channel to include the German North Sea, the Baltic Sea, and the Atlantic coastline from France and Spain down to Africa. The Channel Squadron was a formidable force, comprising six modern battleships, two first-class cruisers, and five smaller cruisers, among other vessels. It was commanded by a Vice-Admiral, supported by a Rear-Admiral as second-in-command, with the senior officer bearing the title "Vice-Admiral commanding" rather than "Commander-in-Chief" to avoid conflicts of authority with the Admirals Superintendents of the home naval ports. Additionally, a Reserve Squadron was maintained in British waters, consisting of five older battleships and four large cruisers, each accompanied by one or two gunboats. These ships served primarily as coast-guard vessels, stationed at various ports throughout the United Kingdom but capable of rapid concentration if required. The Reserve Squadron was overseen by the Admiral Superintendent of the Naval Reserves, whose flag was hoisted on the battleship "Alexandra" at Portland.

The Training Squadron, composed of four older large cruisers, had no fixed area of operations. Its primary purpose was to provide practical sea training for young sailors, and it typically sailed under wind power. Detailed composition of the squadrons varied by station. For example, by October 1896, the Mediterranean fleet comprised thirty-seven ships, including thirteen ironclads (ten of which were of the most modern types), an armoured cruiser, a ram, and a coastal defence vessel stationed at Gibraltar, alongside a variety of cruisers, despatch boats, gunboats, torpedo-boat destroyers, a training sailing vessel, and an old ship of the line serving as guardship at Malta.

The Australia Station, under a Rear-Admiral, included a flagship, seven third-class cruisers, and five gunboats. The Pacific Station, also under a Rear-Admiral, fielded an armoured cruiser, five small cruisers and gunboats, and a storeship. The Cape of Good Hope and West Coast of Africa Station had an armoured cruiser, six cruisers, five gunboats, and a few torpedo-boats, all under a Rear-Admiral. The North America and West Indies Station, commanded by a Vice-Admiral, comprised twelve vessels, including a modern armoured cruiser, several second and third-class cruisers, and a large gunboat. The China Station, commanded by a Vice-Admiral with a Rear-Admiral as deputy and a Commodore at Hong Kong dockyard, had twenty-six vessels: a modern battleship flagship, four armoured cruisers, eight cruisers, gunboats, despatch boats, and torpedo-boat destroyers. By 1899, the Royal Navy's strength stood at 380 ships in commission, with an additional ninety vessels still under construction, reflecting the immense scale and far-reaching organisation of the fleet at the height of British naval power.

== Recruitment and training ==
=== Rank and file ===
Traditionally, the Navy had depended on a mix of recruitment methods—including voluntary enlistment, financial inducements, and, most notoriously, impressment, the forced conscription of seafarers. Although impressment fell into disuse after 1815 due to widespread public and parliamentary opposition, the Admiralty retained the legal right to employ it, viewing this ancient prerogative as an essential safeguard for national security. In response to criticism and the need for a more stable source of manpower, the Admiralty sought to encourage voluntary service by improving conditions and offering incentives. These included increased pay, fixed terms of engagement, and improved leave and pension arrangements. The Naval Enlistment Act of 1853 was a significant legislative milestone in this process. It limited compulsory service to a maximum of five years, after which a sailor could claim discharge, although he could be retained for an additional six months in emergencies with extra pay. The Act also offered double bounties to those who enlisted promptly after a royal proclamation and extended bounty payments to men already serving.

However, the five-year engagement proved problematic in practice. Naval service was largely organized around the commissioning cycle of individual ships, typically lasting three to four years. The law's requirement that men serve five years irrespective of commission cycles led to confusion and inefficiency, as sailors often felt bound to a specific ship rather than to the Navy as a whole. Many seamen ignored or misunderstood the five-year term, and officers complained that the arrangement undermined continuity and efficiency within the fleet.

Despite these difficulties, the mid-century reforms marked a shift away from coercive and ad hoc recruitment methods toward a more systematic approach. The introduction of continuous service—also in 1853—encouraged the enlistment of boys for long-term naval careers, offering further inducements such as higher pay, opportunities for promotion, and pensions. While not immediately successful, these changes reflected the Admiralty's growing recognition that the demands of modern naval warfare required a more professional, skilled, and stable body of seamen, rather than reliance on press gangs or unreliable short-term enlistments.

For ratings—the lower deck sailors of the Royal Navy—training during the Victorian era was initially informal and rooted in hands-on experience. Before steam, ratings learned their trade through direct observation and practical participation, performing ropework, sail handling, gunnery drills, and other essential skills required to operate the complex rigging and heavy guns of wooden sailing warships. Physical endurance and teamwork were emphasized, as was discipline, which was maintained through a strict naval hierarchy. Simultaneously, the Royal Navy began to professionalize its recruitment and preparation of boys—the future seamen. Previously, boys often joined as "powder monkeys" or servants, picking up skills informally through observation and menial work. As the Navy's needs grew more complex, purpose-built or repurposed training ships, such as HMS Impregnable, were established as stationary floating schools. Here, boys aged twelve to fifteen underwent several months to a year of training. Their days were filled with a mix of naval drill, seamanship, sail handling, and gunnery practice, interspersed with classroom lessons in reading, writing, and arithmetic. Physical exercise, boat handling, and parades reinforced discipline and teamwork. This training transformed raw recruits into disciplined "boy seamen" ready to serve in the fleet.

=== Engineers ===
The training of engineers in the Victorian Royal Navy evolved in fits and starts, shaped by persistent issues of social status, recruitment difficulties, and institutional ambivalence. Although a five-year training scheme for "engineer boys" existed as early as 1828, the early decades of naval engineering were characterized by a lack of formal training or apprenticeships, leading to a legacy of informality that would have long-term consequences for the professional stature of naval engineers. Engineers were initially granted warrant rank by an Order in Council in 1837, but this recognition did little to attract suitable candidates; the navy faced chronic shortages, and standards of entry were repeatedly lowered. Poor pay and low status further discouraged applicants, and the few who entered the branch were seen by contemporaries as lacking in both ability and social standing.

Despite their increasing indispensability as steam propulsion became central to naval operations, engineers were long denied parity with other officer classes. Even when, in 1847, they were granted commissioned rank equal to the old navigating masters, they remained socially segregated, dining separately from executive officers, who often regarded them as outsiders. Over time, certain marks of recognition were introduced: engineers received uniforms in 1837, a distinctive button in 1841, the executive "curl" in 1860, and a purple stripe in 1863. Chief engineers with significant seniority achieved a status equivalent to commander, but only the most senior were permitted to join the wardroom.

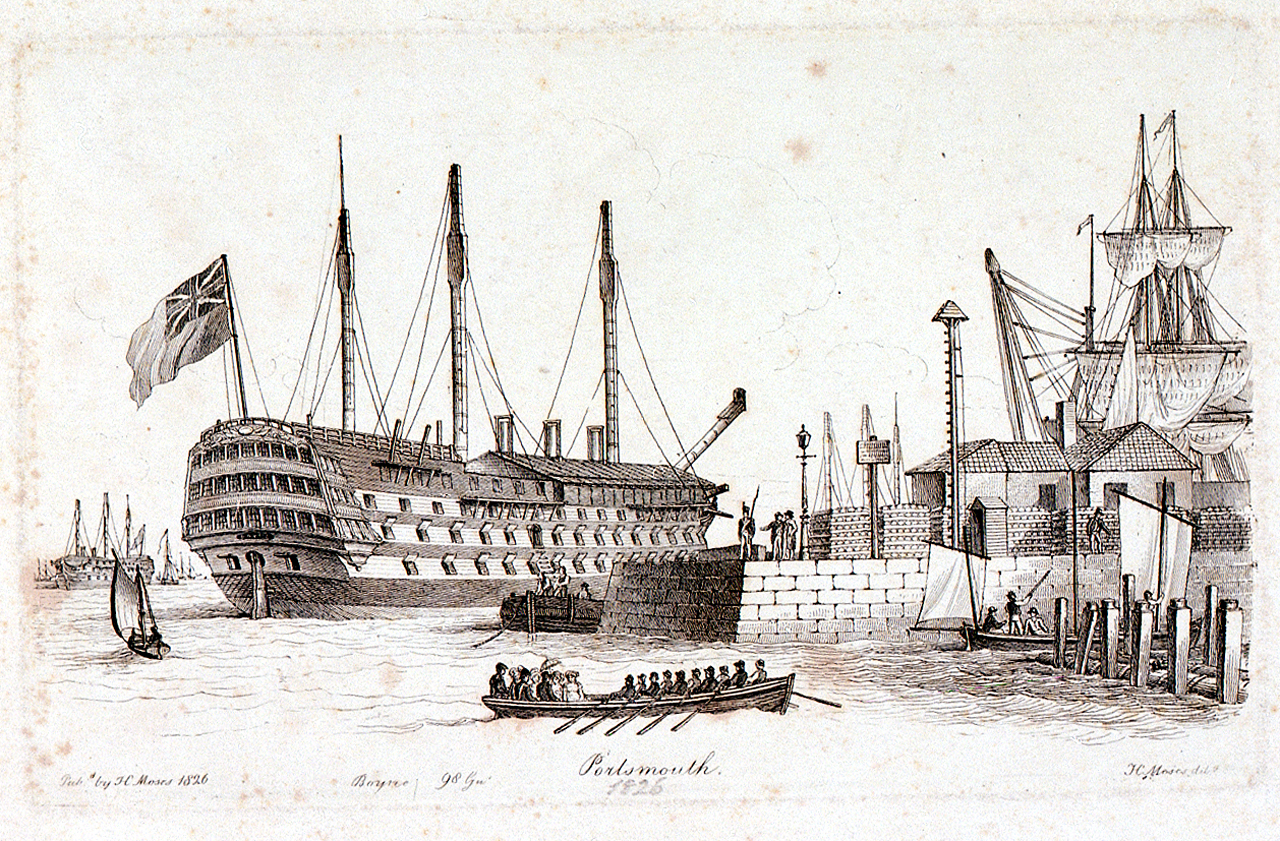
The Boyne (renamed Excellent on 1 December 1834, then Queen Charlotte in 1859) shown at Portsmouth Harbour, starboard-quarter view. Boyne's break up was completed in 1861.

Technical developments, such as the adoption of the screw propeller and the experiences of the Crimean War (1854–1856), underscored the essential role of engineers and stokers in combat and operations. However, the Navy's response to the growing engineering challenge was piecemeal and often reluctant, driven more by crisis than by a genuine desire to improve the branch. The introduction of "engine-room artificers" in 1868 was intended to delineate supervisory roles and elevate engineer officers above manual labor, but instead provoked anxiety and resentment among junior engineers, who saw their prospects threatened. Efforts to improve the situation culminated in the 1870s, when a committee under Admiral Cooper Key examined issues of pay, promotion, and status, only to have its recommendations rejected. Nonetheless, some progress was made with the establishment of dedicated training facilities. An earlier attempt at specialized training had seen the brig Sulphur briefly used as a training ship in the 1840s, but the mainstay of engineering instruction was the dockyard school system, where "engineer boys" received practical education in the navy's industrial environments.

A significant development came in 1877, when HMS Marlborough was converted into accommodation for engineer students, followed in 1880 by the opening of the Royal Naval Engineering College at Keyham, Devonport. Entry to Keyham was by competitive examination for boys aged fourteen to seventeen, who were organized into divisions under a house captain, and lived in conditions that, while spartan, fostered both hard work and camaraderie. The training regime, notably improved under Professor W. M. Worthington, lasted six years and blended theoretical instruction in mathematics and mechanics with practical experience in the workshops and foundries of the dockyards. Students built auxiliary machinery, participated in steam engine trials, and gained operational experience at sea aboard vessels such as HMS Sharpshooter.

Despite these advances, the engineer branch continued to struggle with issues of social standing, lack of disciplinary autonomy, and inconsistent recruitment. The perception among seamen officers that engineers belonged to a lower social class persisted, and engineers themselves complained of their marginalization within naval life. At times of acute shortage, the Admiralty resorted to enlisting "emergency engineers," who often had little in common with the regular officer corps and further exacerbated the sense of division. By the end of the nineteenth century, nearly eighty years after the arrival of steam power in the Royal Navy, the engineering branch remained beset by the same problems that had plagued it from the start: inadequate status, social isolation, and cycles of recruitment crisis. While the technical competence of engineers steadily improved thanks to the rigorous training at Keyham and in the dockyards, the institutional culture of the navy remained slow to recognize the full value and professional dignity of its engineering officers.

Gunnery training also became more formalized as naval artillery grew in power and complexity. Dedicated gunnery schools, such as HMS Excellent, offered ratings specialized instruction in the operation, maintenance, and firing of shipboard guns. Here, men learned the principles of aiming, firing, and maintaining increasingly sophisticated naval armament, ensuring the Navy remained at the forefront of gunnery skills and effectiveness. By 1873, the Excellent, had significantly expanded its curriculum to include mining, torpedo warfare, and electricity. This specialization became so extensive that in 1873, it required its own dedicated facility. This new branch was established aboard a second vessel, HMS Vernon, which was moored near the Excellent. The growth and technical complexity of torpedoes and electrical applications were so rapid that within just three years, the Vernon school was formally separated from the Excellent to become a fully independent establishment dedicated solely to torpedo and electrical training for the fleet.

=== Officers ===
During the Victorian era, the training of Royal Navy officers was shaped by a strong adherence to tradition, social exclusivity, and gradual adaptation to new educational demands. Officer recruitment was not restricted in number, but entry was tightly controlled through a system of nomination by captains, flag officers, and the Admiralty, all of whom exercised careful oversight. The majority of candidates were drawn from established naval families, the aristocracy, the landed gentry, the clergy, the Army, and other professional classes, with a notable geographical concentration from counties in southern England near the principal naval ports. The business and working classes were almost entirely excluded, which reinforced the upper-class character of the officer corps and contributed to a strong sense of caste within naval leadership.

The path to becoming an officer typically began at a young age, with boys entering as first class volunteers between the ages of twelve and fourteen. The initial entrance requirements were minimal: candidates had to be healthy, able to write English correctly from dictation, and familiar with elementary arithmetic, including the 'rule of three'. Those nominated directly by the Admiralty could receive a two-year theoretical grounding at the Royal Naval College, Portsmouth, while others proceeded straight to sea, where they learned through experience. The closure of the college to midshipmen in 1837 led to a period when all training was conducted afloat, but the warship environment was not conducive to academic study, and practical seamanship dominated.

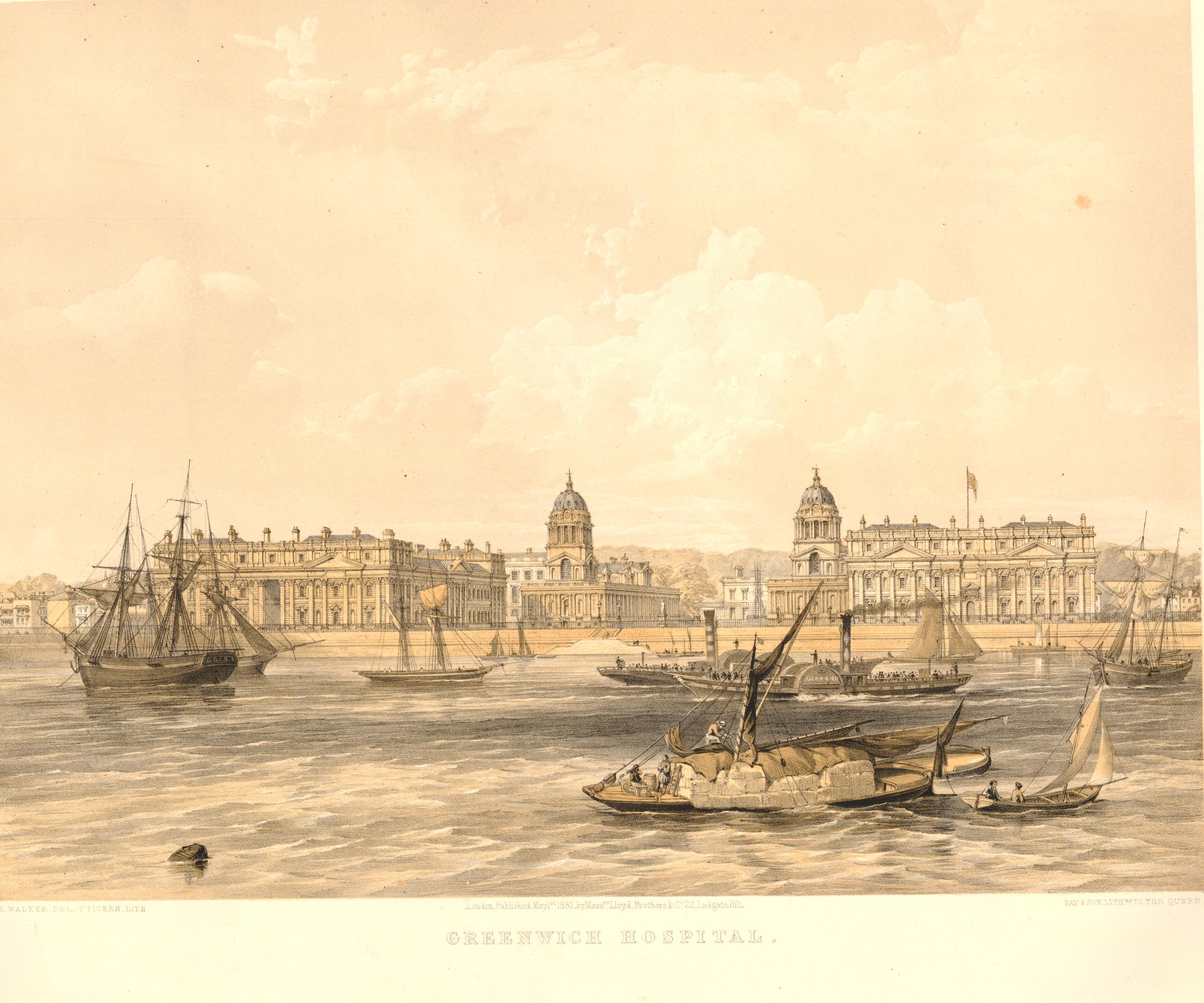
The Greenwich Hospital in 1853 before being used as the Royal Naval College

Upon joining their first ships, young officers—by then usually called naval cadets or midshipmen—faced a spartan and demanding life. They lived in cramped quarters, slept in hammocks, and were immersed in the daily routines of the ship. Instruction was both formal and informal, with midshipmen expected to master practical seamanship: knotting and splicing, sailmaking, steering the ship, taking soundings, and managing the tasks of untrained men. This hands-on apprenticeship was intended to produce officers capable of leading and instructing crews, especially important in a period when portions of the ship's company might be inexperienced.

Throughout the mid-nineteenth century, debate raged over whether cadets should be sent directly to sea or first given a broader education ashore. The Admiralty's compromise was the establishment of dedicated training ships, beginning with HMS Illustrious and later the famed Britannia at Dartmouth. These stationary ships provided a two-year preliminary education where boys lived under strict discipline, sleeping in hammocks and keeping their belongings in sea-chests. The regime was rigorous, beginning each day with a cold saltwater bath, and included a mix of academic study—mathematics, navigation, French, and drawing—and practical seamanship. The ship's facilities were adapted for educational purposes, with classrooms, model rooms, and dormitories replacing guns and armament. Cadets also engaged in physical exercise, boat work, and sports, with a strong emphasis on moral and physical development.

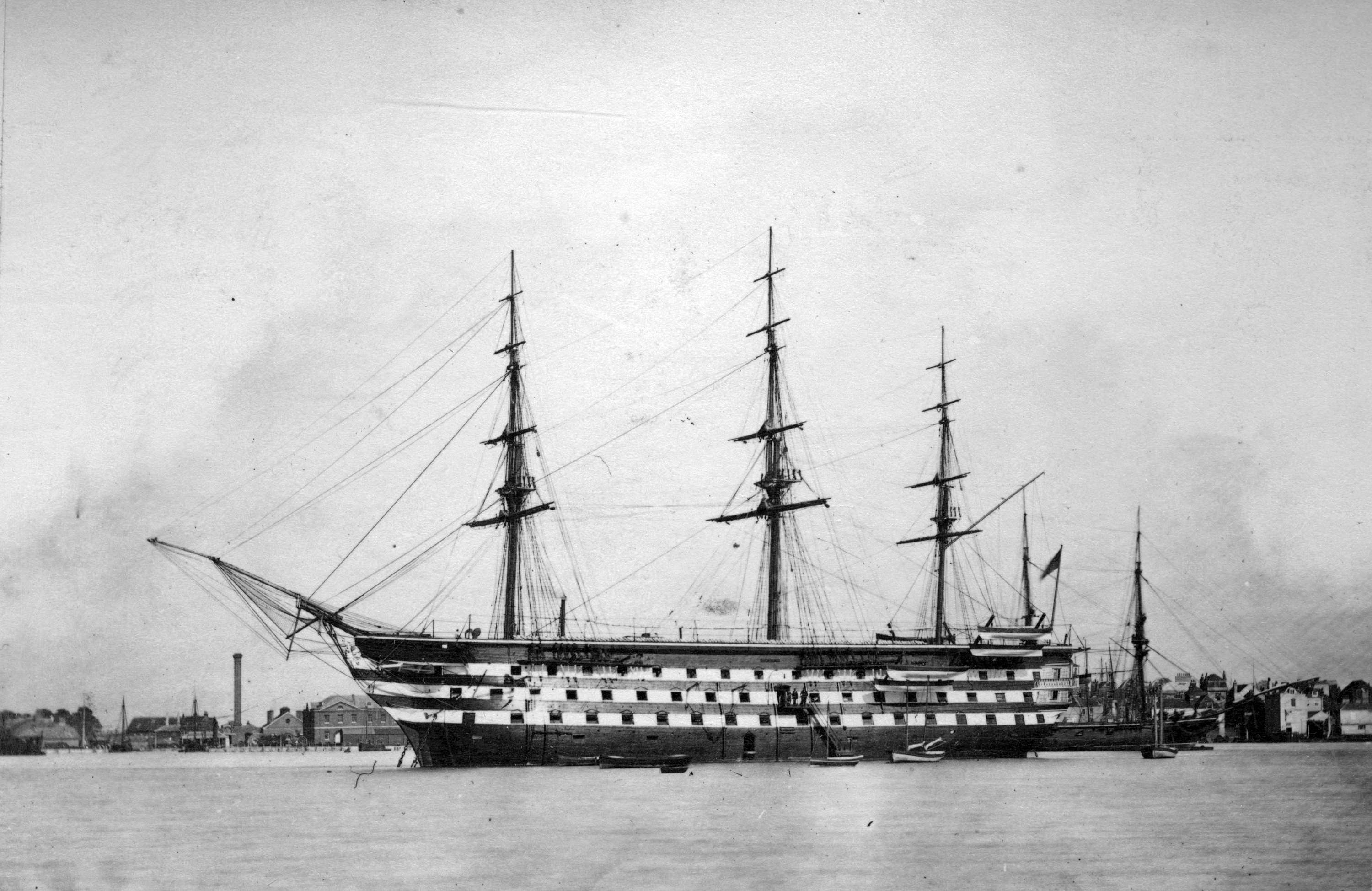
The training ship HMS Britannia at Portsmouth in the 1860s

Discipline aboard these training ships was severe, with the ship's captain and a team of officers in charge of order and training, while academic staff handled instruction but had no disciplinary authority. Reports of poor performance or conduct were dealt with swiftly, leaving no room for appeal. The training regime was designed not only to impart the necessary knowledge and skills but also to instill the values and character expected of a naval officer: leadership, a sense of duty, responsibility, and fair play. After their time in Britannia, cadets spent four years at sea as midshipmen, where their education continued through both experience and formal instruction in navigation, usually provided by a naval instructor. Watch-keeping, boat management, and leadership of seamen were central aspects of this period. Despite the demands of their duties and the distractions of shipboard life, midshipmen were expected to study the manuals and prepare for examinations.

The first major professional milestone was the examination in seamanship by a board of captains, a decisive test for advancement to lieutenant. The process was not standardized and depended on the composition and disposition of the examining board. Those who passed with distinction gained seniority, which could accelerate promotion. Promotion thereafter depended on a combination of merit, patronage, and, increasingly, the acquisition of technical skills such as experience with steam engines. Annual confidential reports on officers' character and ability, including sobriety, became a formal part of the evaluation process. The final stage of formal education took place at the Royal Naval College, Greenwich, established in 1873 as the intellectual center of the officer corps. Here, sub-lieutenants underwent advanced study in navigation, steam engineering, gunnery, and other subjects essential to modern naval warfare.

== Pay ==
Except for the ratings the Royal Navy saw only slightly increase of pay. By the end of the century they remained the same as in the 1850s. Admirals occupied the topmost rung, with a Rear Admiral receiving £1,095 a year and the Admiral of the Fleet earning double that at £2,190. These basic salaries could be substantially increased by allowances for expenses such as "table money" and compensation in lieu of a personal servant—extras that, in some cases, nearly doubled the basic pay.

Naval Captains, whose status could be compared to Lieutenant Colonels in the Army, earned between £410 and £602, determined by their seniority. Their additional allowances ranged from £91 to £125, offering some supplementation but still placing them well below the Admirals in overall remuneration. Commanders, akin to Army Majors, were paid £365 annually, and Lieutenants with sufficient seniority could earn up to £225. At the entry level for commissioned officers, Midshipmen were paid a modest £13, 18 shillings, and 9 pence per year, with every penny counting at that stage. Cadets, who were even more junior, received only £18, 5 shillings per annum.

Engineering officers, whose social standing in the Navy was still ambiguous in the 1890s, were compensated less generously than line officers. An "Engineer," not yet dignified with a formal military title, was paid between £219 and £273, while a "Chief Engineer" could earn up to £401. The most senior technical appointment, the Chief Inspector of Machinery, received £638 per year—a surprisingly modest sum given the Navy's increasing reliance on technical expertise and innovation during this era. Medical officers' pay reflected both their civilian comparators and their rank within the service. Surgeons earned between £209 and £282 depending on seniority, Staff Surgeons ranged from £383 to £438, and Fleet Surgeons from £492 to £602. The Inspector General of Hospitals and Fleets, the top medical post, was paid £1,003 per year, a figure on par with a Rear Admiral's salary, implying parity with respectable civilian medical salaries to attract and retain these professionals.

Warrant Officers—including Gunners, Boatswains, and Carpenters—earned between £100 and £164, their exact pay determined by experience and seniority. Below this, the pay scale dropped sharply. Chief Petty Officers, often regarded as the backbone of naval operations, could earn up to £57, while First-Class Petty Officers received between £39, 10 shillings, 10 pence and £44, 2 shillings, 1 penny annually, making every increment in shillings and pence significant. For the lower deck, rates were much more modest. An Ordinary Seaman received £22, 16 shillings, 3 pence per year, advancing to £28, 17 shillings, 11 pence when promoted to Able Seaman. Boys, a formal rating for young recruits, started at just over £9 a year, with a small increase possible as they gained seniority. In the ship's engine rooms, a Chief Artificer could earn up to £136, while an Artificer might receive between £95 and £118. Stokers, who endured some of the most arduous and uncomfortable conditions aboard, were paid between £30 and £36 per year, a sum that belied the crucial and grueling nature of their work.

== Promotion ==
For an ambitious executive commander in the Royal Navy of the late nineteenth century, promotion to captain marked the pinnacle of achievement and a gateway to further advancement. However, this milestone was often followed by a lengthy period of professional limbo: it was customary for newly promoted captains to remain unemployed and on half pay for as long as four years before being given their first command. Even after receiving a ship, officers could find themselves again on half pay between appointments, particularly while awaiting a harbour service post or, if fortunate, a second command. This system meant that, despite the prestige of attaining captaincy, it was accompanied by considerable financial and professional uncertainty.

The executive officer structure underwent significant reform in 1870 under Mr. Hugh Childers, the First Lord of the Admiralty. His reforms were widely praised and aimed to modernize the pathways of promotion and streamline the officer corps. Childers's intentions were threefold: to ensure that each rank contained a sufficient number of officers for swift mobilization in the event of war, to secure a steady flow of promotions by maintaining seniority-based advancement to lieutenant and flag officer and selection-based progression to commander and captain, and to implement both compulsory and voluntary retirement at designated ages, with suitable pensions for those who retired.

These reforms had notable effects. They enabled approximately 40 percent of officers to rise to the rank of commander, and the chances of further promotion to captain became somewhat more favorable than before. The typical career progression involved a lieutenant spending twelve to seventeen years in rank, generally achieving promotion to commander by age thirty-five. Commanders were typically around forty-one when promoted to captain. Captains, in turn, would spend an average of eleven years in rank before attaining flag rank—promotion to Rear Admiral—at about the age of fifty-two. By this point, a captain's service would often be sufficient to qualify for retirement benefits, given that seventeen years of service were required for a full pension. Nevertheless, the system's major flaw was the protracted periods officers spent on half pay as captains, which could be professionally and financially discouraging.

Promotion beyond the lower-deck ranks was essentially closed off during this period. While regulations allowed for promotion from the lower deck to wardroom officer for acts of gallantry in the presence of the enemy, in reality, such advancements had ceased after the Crimean War. The rigid class system and lack of opportunity meant that, despite the theoretical possibility, a sailor could not realistically hope to rise to officer status. It was not until the twentieth century that meaningful channels of promotion from the lower deck to the wardroom were established. The story of Henry Capper illustrates the frustrations and ambitions of those from outside the officer class; despite his middle-class origins, Capper joined as a lower-deck sailor and resolved to breach the barriers to promotion after being slighted by an officer cousin. His determination encapsulates the aspirations—and the structural limitations—faced by ambitious men in the Victorian Navy.

== Living conditions ==
Living conditions were spartan, whether aboard the great wooden walls of the early Victorian fleet or the ironclads and steamships that emerged as the century progressed. Sailors and officers alike endured cramped quarters, strict routines, and an environment shaped by the demands of naval tradition and the realities of life at sea. For the ordinary sailor, space was at a premium. Men slept in hammocks slung closely together, often in the lower decks deep within the ship's hull. These spaces were poorly ventilated, dark, and prone to dampness, especially in adverse weather or tropical climates. Personal belongings were kept in small sea chests, and privacy was virtually nonexistent. The air was frequently thick with the smells of unwashed bodies, tar, wet clothing, and the ever-present bilge water. Cleanliness was difficult to maintain, and outbreaks of disease were a constant risk, despite efforts to improve hygiene and ventilation as the century advanced.

Routine and discipline were rigidly enforced, with the daily life of a sailor governed by the ship's bell and the orders of officers. The day began early, often with cleaning and "holystoning" the decks, followed by a succession of drills, watches, maintenance tasks, and gunnery practice. The strict hierarchy of the Navy was reflected in every aspect of life, from the division of labor to the allocation of space and the administration of discipline. Officers enjoyed somewhat better conditions, but these too were far from luxurious by modern standards. Young officers and midshipmen were allotted space in the gunroom or wardroom, where they slept in hammocks or, later, in small cabins.

=== Diet ===
At the beginning of the reign of Queen Victoria the official food ration was sparse and sickeningly monotonous, never varying weekly, seasonally, or by climate, except when fresh supplies were acquired in port. Breakfast consisted only of a pint of cocoa or chocolate without milk, along with the infamous "hard tack" biscuit. This biscuit was often years old, brittle, and notoriously infested with weevils and maggots, requiring the consumer—especially on the lower deck—to tap it sharply on the table to remove the browned pests, or simply eat it "in a dark corner so as not to see what you were eating." The main meal, dinner, was served at noon and involved a perpetual rotation between a pound of salt beef one day and salt pork the next. This salted meat was of notoriously poor quality, often having been "knocking about the station for years," and was so tough that cold beef was described as being as hard as fine-grained mahogany suitable for polishing. The meat was supplemented by thick pease soup with the pork, or flour, suet, and raisins for a weekly pudding (duff) with the beef, always accompanied by more hard biscuit.

Food preparation was the crew's own responsibility within their respective messes. A weekly "cook" would collect the rations—weighed out from "evil-smelling casks"—and prepare the ingredients with any meager seasonings they had purchased. These preparations were then taken to the galley and entrusted to the Ship's Cook (often a disabled crew member) who boiled everything in one large copper pot. During times of limited oven capacity for baking fresh meat in harbour, the Ship's Cook improvised by stacking the meat dishes pyramid-style over the copper's steam vent before quickly placing them in the oven to "brown off."

Supper, served between 4:30 and 5:00 p.m., consisted merely of tea without milk and the ever-present biscuit. After this, only the evening grog ration was available until breakfast at 6:30 a.m. the next day. The official rations provided approximately 2,900 calories per day, which was estimated to be only about three-quarters of the intake required by a hard-labouring man, leading to a state of persistent hunger. However, the reality was not always as grim as the official figures suggested. Sailors supplemented their diet by purchasing or bartering fresh produce from bumboats in most ports. Larger ships took live cattle and sheep aboard for fresh meat—one sailor reported shipping thirteen bullocks in 1841—while the use of seine nets and fishing provided welcome fresh fish and fowl on distant patrols.

A major supplement came through the system of "savings in lieu of rations", where sailors received money for rations they did not draw, using the funds to purchase more palatable items from the Purser's private "canteen." This system grew steadily until it was formally incorporated into the King's Regulations to safeguard the crew from exploitation, though Petty Officers often leveraged their status for personal gain from high canteen prices. In addition to food, all hands were allowed a gallon of beer per day and a quarter-pint of rum, served twice daily as grog (mixed two-to-one with water) after dinner and after supper. In the tropics, it was mixed with lemon or lime juice to prevent scurvy. Although sharing or selling grog was prohibited, the rum tot remained a prime item of exchange. Many men would save their ration, often drinking themselves into insensibility, and drunkenness was not confined to the men.

=== Punishment ===
Discipline in the Victorian Royal Navy was governed by a set of regulations that provided for two primary judicial processes: summary punishment and the court-martial. The power to punish summarily, rooted in seventeenth-century custom, allowed naval authorities to deal swiftly with minor offenses, reflecting the independent and often remote nature of naval operations compared to other military services. Commanders were granted considerable discretion, including the immediate execution of sentences without the need for prior authorization or confirmation, a practice only partially curtailed by the Admiralty during the 1860s.

For more serious offenses, the Navy relied on the court-martial, an institution dating back to the sixteenth century. By the following century, established precedent required that such proceedings take place aboard a King's or Queen's ship, with all available admirals and captains serving as judges. Court-martials were conducted in a formal and elaborate manner, incorporating some safeguards and procedures from civilian law. The court comprised the convened officers, a prosecutor (typically an officer from the accused's ship), and, after 1860, a legal overseer from the office of the naval judge advocate. The accused was permitted to have civilian defense counsel, though in practice this was of limited benefit, as courts often resented outside legal intervention and rarely granted permission for civilian lawyers to participate actively. Most accused therefore defended themselves, and it was rare for the Admiralty to provide legal assistance.

Each court-martial's proceedings—detailed in the Minutes and Proceedings—were automatically reviewed at two or more levels. The convening authority, usually the relevant commander-in-chief, could comment and make recommendations but not alter the judgment. The Board of Admiralty then reviewed every case, with the power to approve, remit, remonstrate, order further review, annul, or even call for a new trial, though it could not increase the punishment imposed. Capital sentences required the approval of the Crown, which also served as the final court of appeal and pardon, though such recourse was seldom sought by naval personnel. Legal questions arising during these processes were referred to the Law Office for expert opinion, and the Admiralty Digests documented numerous inquiries on disciplinary matters.

Disciplinary regulations applied not only to the Royal Navy but also to attached forces such as the Royal Marines (when aboard ship) and the Coast Guard, both of which largely adopted naval customs and procedures. The Royal Marines, while subject to naval discipline aboard, maintained their own separate unit structure and could decisively influence the outcome of disturbances or mutinies. Historically, discipline had been the domain of the boatswain, who lost much of his disciplinary authority in the eighteenth century to the master-at-arms and ship's corporal. The boatswain, however, retained the role of administering corporal punishment, specifically flogging with the cat-o'-nine-tails, upon the commanding officer's order.

From 1810, the Admiralty implemented bureaucratic oversight of punishment practices, requiring warrants for each offense and punishment, signed by the commanding officer twelve hours before execution to allow for reconsideration or mitigation. Quarterly Punishment Returns, introduced in 1811, provided detailed records of all punishments, ensuring that any unrecorded cases were deemed illegal. This growing bureaucracy included guides, tables, and inspection provisions, especially from the early 1860s, to standardize disciplinary practices. The culmination was the 1862 introduction of the Table of Summary Punishments, a printed guide specifying authorized punishments, who could impose them, and requiring all such punishments to be entered in the Defaulter's Book and reported in Quarterly Returns. Only the twenty-nine listed punishments could be used, ranging from discharge with disgrace to corporal punishment, with specific, less severe forms for boys. Devices such as gags, irons, and handcuffs were increasingly restricted or abolished, especially following publicized incidents and deaths.

Branding or "marking" remained a punishment for Royal Marines until the 1870s despite its prohibition in 1865, but it was never used against navy personnel. The navy was slower than the army and civilian authorities to abolish corporal punishment, with reformers such as Sir Samuel Romilly and Joseph Hume MP pressing for change. Parliamentary oversight intensified, with regular returns of punishment statistics. The Admiralty issued repeated injunctions against excessive punishment and sometimes intervened to correct perceived injustices. Flogging for petty officers was banned as a summary punishment in 1827, though court-martials could still impose it. The punishment of "black-list" offenders (later termed "10A") imposed severe daily hardships, including early waking, public meals, extra duties, and unpleasant tasks. The most detested punishments included stoppage of grog and dilution of rum.

The disrating or dishonourable discharge of the master-at-arms was conducted publicly and humiliatingly, involving the cutting of his service certificate, the turning of his jacket inside out, and a rope placed around his neck as he was led around the ship before departure. The movement toward reform accelerated in the mid-nineteenth century. Flogging numbers declined through the 1830s and 1840s, and individual abuses such as those by Commander Pitman of the Childers led to court-martial and dismissal. By 1871, flogging was suspended in peacetime, and by 1879 it was abolished entirely, though theoretically it could be reintroduced during wartime. The trend shifted towards confinement as the preferred punishment; the Admiralty considered and implemented the use of onboard cells (prohibiting coal bunkers as makeshift cells in 1862) and sentenced men to military prisons where available.

== Medical service ==
Following the Admiralty reorganization of 1832 by Sir James Graham, the Department of the Medical Director-General of the Navy was created, with the Chief-Physician of the Navy assuming the newly established post of Medical Director-General. This official was made responsible for overseeing all medical duties within the navy, both afloat and ashore, including administration of naval hospitals and the training, performance, and conduct of medical staff and nurses. The Medical Director-General was charged with maintaining the medical inventory for all naval hospitals, ensuring the provision and renewal of medical stores both at home and in overseas stations, and managing the logistical challenges inherent in supporting a global fleet, such as the preparation of medical supplies for thousands of men at major outposts like Malta.

The scope of the Medical Director-General's responsibilities extended to the financial oversight of medical services, including control over salaries, procurement of drugs, and other stores, assisted by a specialized accounting branch. While he did not purchase stores directly, he submitted requisitions to the financial section of the Admiralty. The network of naval sanatoriums and hospitals was extensive, with major facilities located at Haslar (near Portsmouth), Portsmouth, Plymouth, Chatham, Yarmouth, Sheerness, Portland, Dartmouth, Walmer, and Haulbowline, as well as overseas at Gibraltar, Malta, Ascension, the Cape, Trincomalee, Hong Kong, Yokohama, Sydney, Esquimalt, Coquimbo, Port Royal, Bermuda, and Halifax. Temporary care arrangements and contracts for patient accommodation were also made in many locations domestically and abroad.

Historically, the medical service in the Royal Navy had been in a poor state, with high mortality rates due to inadequate care. Naval doctors, referred to as surgeons, functioned as early general practitioners, practicing both medicine and surgery. An 1815 Act exempted them from civilian certification, making naval or military service an appealing entry into the medical profession. However, the standards and reputation of naval surgeons in the early Victorian period suffered due to issues such as drink, desertion, fraudulent accounting, venereal disease, and debt, leading to frequent vacancies. Despite these challenges, naval service also offered unique opportunities for distinction.

The dental service was formally established in 1880, reflecting the growing complexity of medical provision. Nursing in naval hospitals underwent significant changes during the century. Early in the period, women and men served as nurses, but women were considered mere servants and received no medical training. By the mid-century, with the advent of anaesthesia, surgical procedures became more advanced and intensive nursing was increasingly required. Social changes, particularly the emergence of educated, unmarried women seeking respectable employment, led to the professionalization of nursing. Influenced by figures such as Florence Nightingale and her lesser-known naval counterpart Eliza Mackenzie, reforms were introduced that, by the 1880s, saw the employment of trained "Sisters" from the middle class, who were given status akin to officers within the hospitals. Although initially not deployed to sea, by 1898 naval nursing sisters served aboard hospital ships.

The career path for a naval surgeon was open to qualified British men aged 21 to 28, who had to pass a competitive examination and present certificates of good conduct. Successful candidates received practical instruction in hygiene at Haslar Hospital and were then assigned to ships or shore establishments. On board, the ship's surgeon was required to conduct daily visits to patients, monitor crew health and shipboard sanitation, and advise commanding officers on issues such as drinking water, diet, and ventilation. Each sailor was medically examined on entry, vaccinated, and his health status meticulously recorded. Surgeons also maintained a detailed diary of the sanitary conditions of ports visited, diseases encountered, treatments administered, and the effectiveness of medicines.

By the late Victorian era, the medical service included a well-defined hierarchy: Medical Director-General, deputy inspectors general, fleet surgeons, staff surgeons, and surgeons, with a total of over 400 medical officers. Naval hospitals were major establishments, such as Haslar, which employed a large staff and served as the principal training ground for new medical personnel. The sick berth staff, who provided basic patient care, were recruited from the shore and received special training at Haslar.

== Uniforms and ranks ==
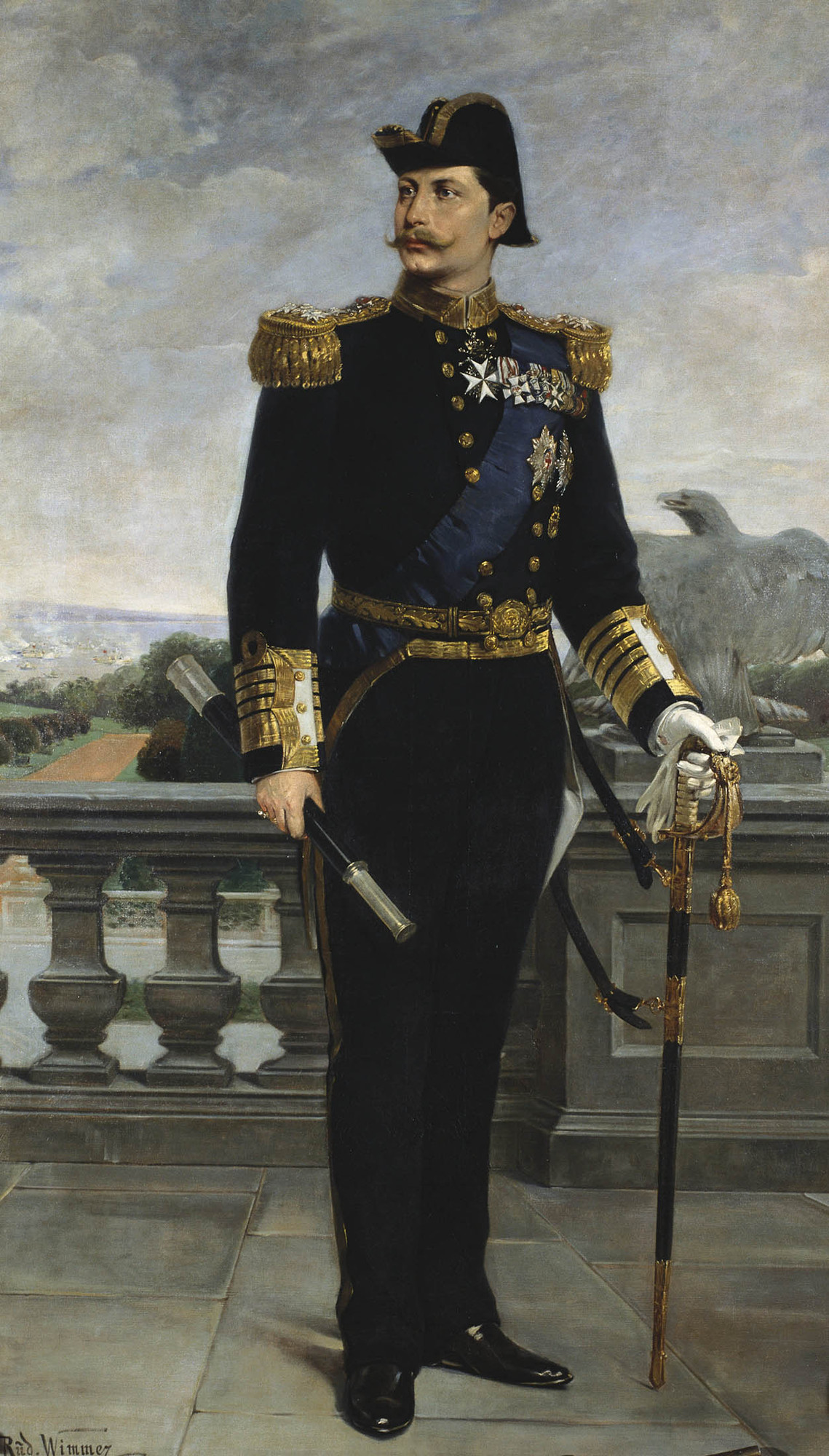
Wilhelm II in the uniform of an Admiral of the Fleet in the British Royal Navy with the Garter riband and star

The uniforms of the Royal Navy underwent a series of gradual but significant modifications throughout the reign of Queen Victoria, reflecting both evolving naval technology and shifts in military fashion. At the outset of Victoria's reign, there were few notable changes from the earlier period. In 1837, the first engineers were directed to wear uniforms identical to those of carpenters, boatswains, and gunners. However, by December 1841, first-class engineers received a distinctive double-breasted blue coat with a turned-down collar and round cuffs, adorned with three buttons on each cuff and seven on each side of the coat, arranged in specific groupings. A unique button featuring a steam engine with a crown, symbolizing the navy's embrace of steam propulsion, was introduced, with button sizes on the collar distinguishing between classes of engineers. This specialized uniform for engineers was abolished in 1853, aligning their dress with the civil branches and introducing a new button arrangement.

The most substantial early change came in 1846, when the previously introduced scarlet collar and cuffs were discontinued, and white collars with blue cuffs and white slashed flaps were restored. Gold lace stripes on skirt lacing were reintroduced for officers of flag rank, and new insignia on epaulettes were established: captains of less than three years' seniority adopted the crown, commanders wore an anchor, lieutenants had plain epaulettes, and mates wore a single fringed epaulette on the right shoulder. Admirals of the Fleet were distinguished by elaborately embroidered epaulettes featuring acorn and oak leaf patterns, a pearl crescent, stars, crossed batons, and a crown. Navigating branch officers wore uniforms similar to the executive branch but with different epaulette devices. The introduction of a crown badge on caps above the band was officially regulated, though some ships had already adopted this practice.

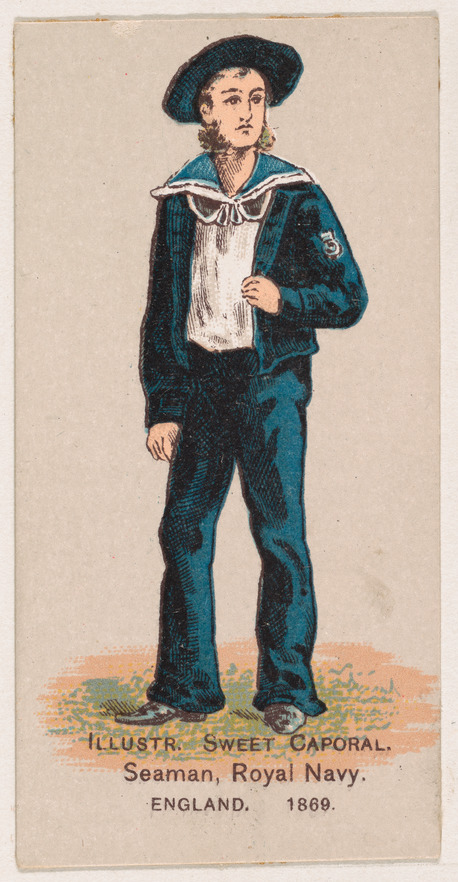
Seaman uniform in 1869

The dress of the ordinary seaman also changed markedly from Nelson's era. The once-common striped trousers and spotted handkerchiefs gave way to more standardized, though not yet strictly regulated, outfits. By the mid-1840s, the crew of the royal yacht Victoria and Albert set a model of uniformity with white frocks, blue cuffs, broad blue collars with three white lines, white bell-bottomed trousers, striped shirts, and knotted black handkerchiefs. The ship's name was often painted on the band around the sennet hat. In 1845, the supply of blue jean and Dutch tape for blue collars and facings was authorized, leading to the standardization of three white lines on collars—a detail later mythologized but originally the product of compromise. Despite these moves towards uniformity, captains retained considerable discretion, resulting in a variety of crew dress, including distinctive regional or foreign-inspired outfits on certain ships.

A major milestone was reached in 1856 and 1857 with the implementation of comprehensive dress regulations for officers and, for the first time, uniform dress for seamen, petty officers, and boys. The seaman's uniform now included a blue cloth jacket and trousers, white duck trousers, a white frock, a square blue collar with three rows of white tape, a pea jacket, a black silk scarf, a black canvas hat with a gold-lettered ribbon, a working cap, and a sennet hat. Badges were blue on white uniforms and red on blue, and new recruits were issued hammocks and bedding. For officers, the 1856 regulations standardized the use of gold lace stripes on cuffs to denote rank, with executive officers' stripes forming a distinctive "curl." Civil branches had stripes without the curl, and were further distinguished by a gold anchor and crown cap badge, gold lace loops, and flat hat tassels. Epaulettes for civil officers had silver edging and gold wire devices, while executive officers' epaulettes featured gold edging and silver wire.

The system for denoting rank continued to evolve through the 1860s, with the introduction of new badges for petty officers and seamen, and the transition from painted to gilt cap ribbons. The single epaulette for certain junior officers was replaced with a pair of scales without fringes, edged in gold or silver according to branch. In 1861, the mate's rank was elevated to sub-lieutenant, and new cuff lace arrangements were introduced for various officer grades. In 1863, colored velvet between lace stripes was adopted to indicate civil branches, and white linen cap covers were sanctioned for hot weather. Senior warrant officers such as chief gunner, chief boatswain, and chief carpenter were introduced in 1865, signified by a half-inch lace stripe on the cuff.

By the late 1860s, further adjustments included the official permission for beards and moustaches—provided they were worn together and maintained neatly—and the introduction of embroidered cap ribbons. Uniform regulations for ratings were essentially settled by 1857, with additional specialist badges introduced as the navy modernized and new technologies such as torpedoes were adopted. By the end of the century, blue cloth jackets and stiff hats were abolished, and the Victorian Navy's uniforms had reached a form recognizable as the precursor to modern naval dress, shaped by a century of evolving needs, technological advances, and the balance between tradition and innovation.

== Equipment ==
At the beginning of Queen Victoria's reign, the Brunswick rifle was among the few rifled arms in service, although it was not widely issued. The majority of sailors and marines continued to rely on smoothbore muskets. However, the success of the Minie system, which dramatically improved the range and accuracy of rifled firearms, prompted the Royal Navy to convert existing muskets for the Royal Marines into rifles, resulting in the Pattern 1842 Rifle-Musket. By the late 1850s, the Enfield Pattern 1858 rifle had become a standard-issue weapon, offering further improvements in precision and effectiveness. The 1860s saw the introduction of the Enfield-Snider, a breech-loading conversion of the earlier Enfield rifles, which increased the rate of fire and simplified reloading under the demanding conditions at sea or during landing operations. As firearm technology continued to evolve, the Martini-Henry rifle was adopted, bringing a robust single-shot, breech-loading mechanism that became a hallmark of British military arms in the later 19th century. By the 1890s, the Lee-Metford rifle—a bolt-action, magazine-fed weapon—became the standard rifle of the Royal Navy.

Prior to the 1850s and the Crimean War, naval guns saw little advancement. The mainstay weapons were heavy, smooth-bore iron guns on crude wooden carriages, little changed from Nelson's era, and fired solid or explosive-filled spherical shot. These guns were moved on wooden trucks, controlled by friction and rope breechings, and managed by large crews, each with a highly specific role in the loading and firing process. The introduction of carronades—shorter, lighter guns with larger calibres—offered greater firepower at close range but were not officially recognized as part of a ship's main armament, complicating their adoption and classification.

The real revolution began with William Armstrong's innovations in gun manufacture in the mid-nineteenth century, introducing wrought iron and eventually steel into gun construction. Armstrong's methods, led to the development of rifled guns that dramatically surpassed smooth-bores in range, accuracy, and penetrative power. Early Armstrong breech-loaders, however, experienced issues with breech mechanisms, causing accidents and leading to a temporary British return to rifled muzzle-loaders, which became standard until the 1870s. The British persisted with muzzle-loaders, producing ever larger and more powerful guns, such as the massive 80-ton, 16-inch calibre gun used on HMS Inflexible and even larger 100-ton guns for shore emplacements. However, the development of improved propellants—first large grain prismatic powder, then prismatic brown powder, and finally slow-burning cocoa powder—demanded guns with larger chambers and greater length, requirements that could only be met by breech-loading designs.

By the late 1880s, the British Admiralty adopted the French interrupted screw breech mechanism with the De Bange obturator, along with a full transition to steel gun construction. Armstrong was again tasked with gun design, this time producing weapons with thin steel tubes, long jackets, and layers of shrunk-on steel hoops. Although super-heavy guns of up to 110 tons were constructed, practical limitations such as barrel droop, slow rates of fire, bore erosion, and lengthy manufacturing times led to a reduction in calibre, with 12-inch and 13.5-inch guns.

A major leap came with the introduction of cordite, a smokeless, efficient propellant that permitted longer barrels and much higher projectile velocities—up to 3,000 feet per second by the early twentieth century. Alongside these advances in heavy artillery, the Royal Navy also embraced the development of quick-firing guns to counter fast-moving threats like torpedo boats. Early rapid-fire weapons used innovative breech mechanisms and fixed ammunition, allowing much faster rates of fire than older guns. The Hotchkiss and Nordenfelt 3- and 6-pounders, followed by heavier quick-firing guns such as the 4.7-inch and 6-inch models, became essential secondary and even primary armament on many ships, dramatically increasing the Navy's ability to deliver a sustained barrage against smaller, more agile targets.

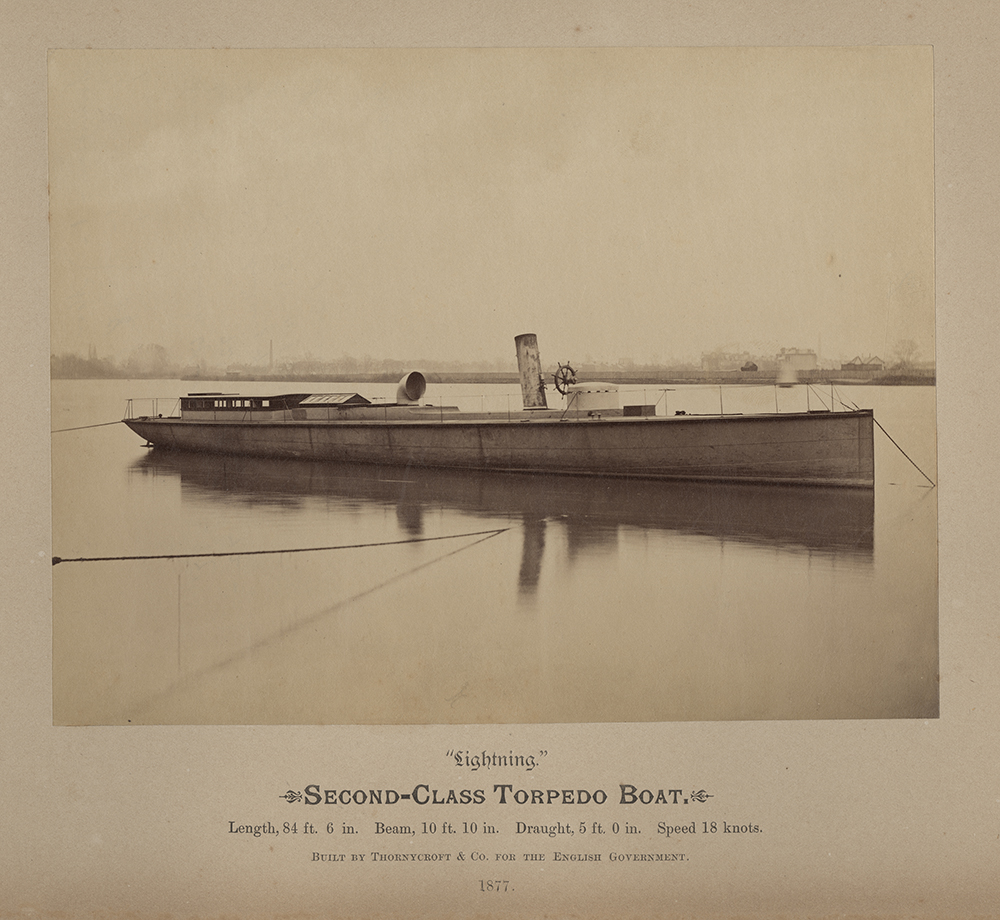
HMS Lightning, very first British vessel with torpedoes

In the 1860s and 1870s, the term "torpedo" in the Royal Navy encompassed a variety of submerged or floating explosive devices, including what are now called mines as well as early forms of the self-propelled torpedo. Among the principal types employed by the British Navy were the spar torpedo, the Harvey (outrigger) torpedo, and the locomotive or Whitehead torpedo. The spar torpedo consisted of an explosive charge mounted on a pole intended to be detonated against an enemy ship by a crew in a small boat, a method fraught with danger for the attackers. The Harvey torpedo, introduced in 1867, was designed to be towed behind or alongside a ship, acting primarily as a defensive measure against ramming attacks. The Whitehead torpedo, meanwhile, was a self-propelled device launched from one ship and intended to travel underwater to strike another—a concept that would become the standard for torpedoes in the future.

Initially, the Admiralty was hesitant to adopt the Harvey torpedo, citing difficulties in its practical application, but it was eventually accepted for naval service in 1870, though its operational use remained largely defensive. The spar torpedo never saw widespread adoption in the Royal Navy, primarily due to its inherent dangers and the emergence of more practical alternatives. The Whitehead torpedo, developed in the late 1860s but not immediately acquired by Britain, gradually proved superior to earlier types. Observers from the Royal Navy attended trials of the device in Fiume in 1869 and, following successful tests in England in 1870, the Admiralty resolved to purchase the rights to the weapon despite initial bureaucratic delays. By the early 1870s, the Whitehead torpedo was being incorporated into British warship designs, quickly rendering both spar and Harvey torpedoes obsolete in offensive roles. The latter's use declined rapidly, and by 1880, existing stocks were withdrawn from service.

== Transformation from wood to steel and sail to steam ==
The early nineteenth century saw the establishment of the School of Naval Architecture at Portsmouth, signaling the Admiralty's commitment to blending theory with practice. Graduates, initially met with skepticism, would by 1860 occupy senior technical positions, shaping ship design with a more rigorous, scientific methodology. The Admiralty also adopted competitive ship trials, racing vessels from different designers to refine and improve performance.

Captain William Symonds, appointed Surveyor in 1832, broke from traditional design rules, producing ships with high, dry gun decks and spacious hulls. However, his resistance to new technology—particularly propellers and iron hulls—highlighted the ongoing tension between established practices and emerging innovations. Meanwhile, the Royal Navy began cautiously experimenting with steam propulsion. Initial efforts in the late eighteenth and early nineteenth centuries met with limited success, but by the 1820s, steam tugs like the Comet and Lightning were in service, and by the 1830s, larger paddle steamers such as the Medea and Gorgon were being built. These vessels showed the tactical value of steam power, especially during colonial engagements and the Crimean War, as their ability to arrive on schedule was highly prized.

Iron hulls represented the next technological leap. Although iron had been used in commercial vessels like the Aaron Manby since the 1820s, its adoption in warships was hampered by challenges such as magnetic interference with compasses and doubts about their resilience under fire. Sir George Airy's work in 1838 solved the compass issue, enabling the construction of seagoing iron ships. The East India Company's Nemesis and the Mexican frigate Guadeloupe demonstrated the promise of iron hulls, being lighter, requiring less draught, and easier to repair. The Admiralty ordered several iron vessels, but continued to face resistance, with political and technical objections compounded by ambiguous results from trials. Experiments showed that iron hulls could be both easily punctured by high-velocity shot and dangerously splintered by lower-velocity impacts, raising concerns about their suitability for warships. Fouling, which reduced speed, was another unresolved issue.

The development of screw propulsion provided critical momentum for change. In the 1830s, John Ericsson and Francis Pettit Smith independently developed workable screw propellers, leading to successful trials with ships like the Archimedes and the Rattler. The Rattler's superiority over paddlers in trials convinced the Admiralty of the screw's value, especially since its machinery was safely below the waterline. Despite initial skepticism and technical teething problems, the adoption of the screw propeller meant that steam engines could be integrated into warships without sacrificing broadside armament.

The Navy's first steam battleships were conversions of existing wooden ships, such as the Ajax in 1845, which, despite some compromises in armament and cramped machinery spaces, proved the viability of steam-powered ships of the line. Purpose-built steam battleships, like the Agamemnon (ordered in 1849), followed and confirmed the advantages of designing ships specifically for steam propulsion rather than retrofitting them. The mid-nineteenth century saw a complex mix of new construction and conversions, as the Admiralty sought to balance the need for modernity with financial and material realities. Leaders like Captain Baldwin Walker, who succeeded Symonds as Surveyor, focused on administration and broad construction policy, steering the transition from sail to screw auxiliary ships. This approach allowed the Navy to maintain a credible fleet during a period of rapid French expansion and public anxiety about British naval supremacy.

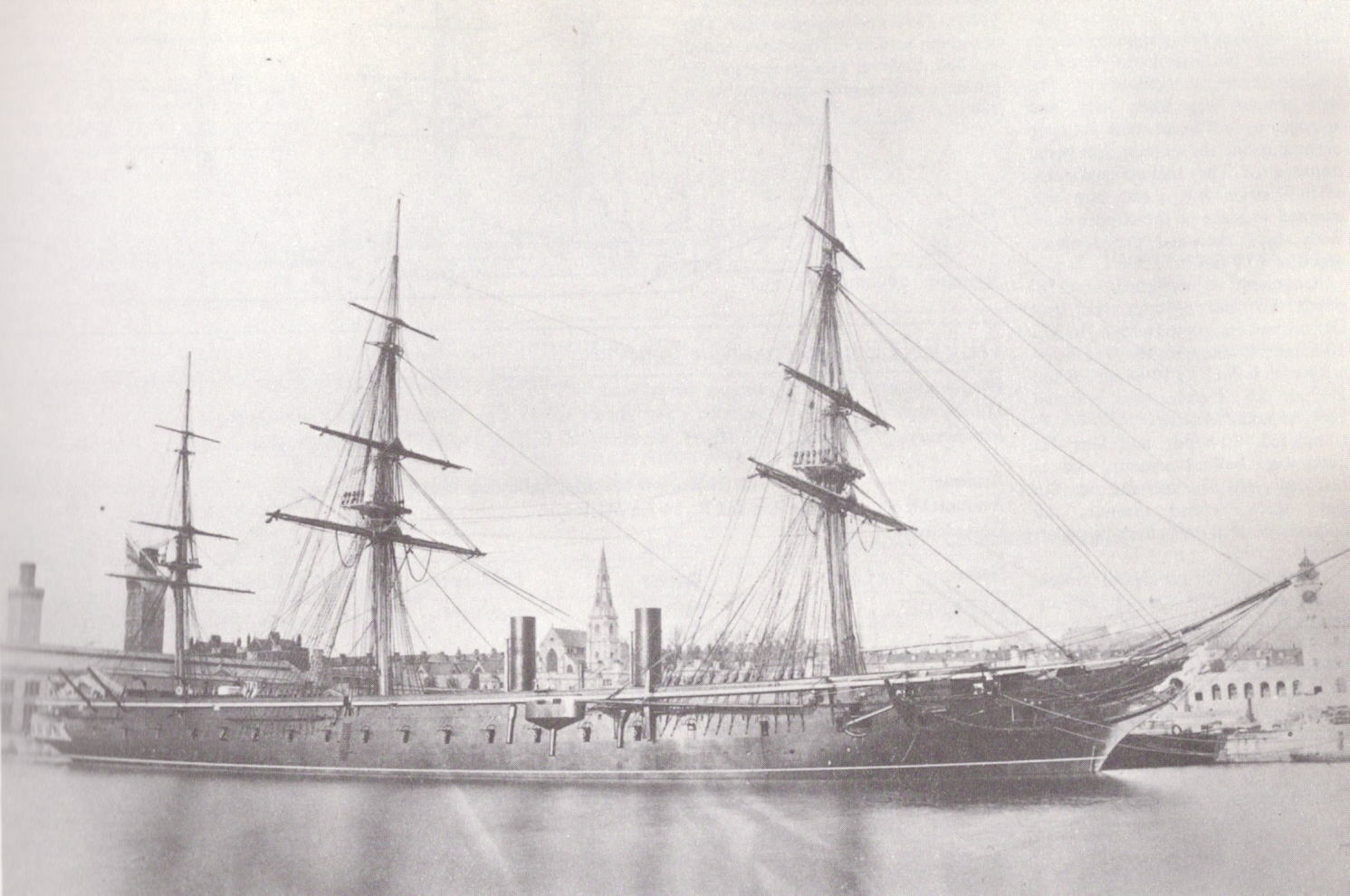
HMS Warrior after the reduction of her bowsprit but before she was rearmed in 1867.

Technical challenges persisted. Early full-powered steamers suffered from high coal consumption and unreliable machinery, making them inefficient for long cruises. The optimal solution became the auxiliary steamer, which combined sail power for cruising efficiency with steam for tactical flexibility. Ships like the Arrogant demonstrated that the integration of steam engines did not necessarily compromise sailing performance, winning over conservative elements of the Admiralty. Political and institutional challenges also shaped the transition. Financial constraints, internal administrative disputes, and resistance from figures like Sir William Symonds slowed progress. The resignation of Walker, amid political infighting, illustrates the complex interplay of personal, professional, and political factors at work.

By the late 1850s, the policy of building a steam battlefleet was firmly established, supported by key figures such as First Lord Sir James Graham. The successful deployment of steam battleships during the Crimean War marked the operational vindication of these policies, even as the Navy continued to grapple with the best balance between sail and steam, wood and iron. The final decades of the transition were characterized by further technical refinement. The British remained cautious, often favoring auxiliary sail and hoisting propellers to optimize performance under both steam and sail. The reliance on established engine builders, such as Penn and Maudslay, ensured reliability and performance, but also reflected a conservative approach to innovation. Ultimately, it was not until later advances in metallurgy and ship design—especially with the advent of steel and the ironclad Warrior that the transition was complete.

== See also ==
- History of the Royal Navy

== Bibliography ==
- Admiralty, ed. (1879). The Queen's Regulations and Admiralty Instructions for the Government of Her Majesty's Naval Service 1879. London: Her Majesty's Stationery Office.
- Admiralty, ed. (1850). Rates of pay of the Royal Navy, commencing on the 1st January 1851, as established by Her Majesty's order in Council, dated 24th September, 1850. London: Her Majesty's Stationery Office.
- Beeler, John (2001). Birth of the battleship : British capital ship design 1870-1881. Annapolis: Naval Institute Press. ISBN 1557502137.
- Brassey, Thomas, ed. (1899). The Naval Annual 1899. Portsmouth: J. Griffin & Co.
- Brown, David K.; et al. (The Oxford illustrated History of the Royal Navy) (1995). Wood, Sail, and Cannonballs to Steel, Steam, and Shells: 1815–1895. Oxford: Oxford University Press. ISBN 0192116754.
- Hamilton, Richard Vesey (1896). Naval administration; the constitution, character, and functions of the Board of admiralty, and of the civil departments it directs. London: G. Bell and sons.
- Lambert, Andrew (1984). Battleships in transition: The creation of the steam battlefleet, 1815-1860. London: Conway Maritime Press. ISBN 085177315X.
- Lavery, Brian (2011). Royal Tars: The Lower Deck of the Royal Navy, 857-1850. Annapolis, Maryland: Naval Institute Press. ISBN 9781591147435.
- Myatt, Frederick (1989). The Illustrated Encyclopedia of 19th Century Firearms. London: Tiger Books International. ISBN 1855010275.
- Rodger, N.A.M. (2024). The Price of Victory: A Naval History of Britain: 1815 – 1945. London: Penguin. ISBN 9781846147234.
- Padfield, Peter (1981). Rule Britannia: the Victorian and Edwardian Navy. London: Routledge. ISBN 0710007744.
- Robinson, Charles N. (1894). The British Fleet; the Growth, Achievements and Duties of the Navy of the Empire. London: G. Bell & sons. OCLC 1041620627.
- Rasor, Eugene (1976). Reform in the Royal Navy:a social history of the lower deck, 1850 to 1880. Hamden, Conn.: Archon Books. OCLC 1319576496.
- Stenzel, Alfred (1898). The British Navy. London: Fisher Unwin.
- Warren, Berry (2013). The Pre-Dreadnought Revolution: developing the Bulwarks of Sea Power. Stroud, Gloucestershire: The History Press. ISBN 9780752457949.
- Wells, John (1999). An illustrated social history 1870-1982. London: Wrens Park. ISBN 0-905-778-308.
- Wilkinson-Latham, Robert (1990). The Royal Navy, 1790-1970. London: Osprey. ISBN 0850452481.
- Winton, John (1977). Hurrah for the life of a sailor!: life on the lower-deck of the Victorian Navy. London: Joseph. OCLC 1193960755.
- Winton, John; et al. (The Oxford illustrated History of the Royal Navy) (1995). Life and Education in a technically evolving Navy 1815 – 1925. Oxford: Oxford University Press. ISBN 0192116754.
