= Minister of Shipping =

The Minister of Shipping was a British government post created in the First World War and again in the Second World War. In 1941 it was merged into the position of Minister of Transport which was then renamed Minister of War Transport.

== History ==
Sir Joseph Maclay, 1st Baronet (16 December 1916 – 31 March 1921), as "Shipping Controller" was the first holder of the post. As Sir Joseph was not a member of either house of Parliament, a Parliamentary Secretary was appointed to represent him in the Commons. The first was Sir Leo Chiozza Money (22 December 1916) who was succeeded on 10 January 1919 by Leslie Orme Wilson who held the post until 31 March 1921

The responsibilities overseen by the minister included what had been the Transport Board that was part of the Navy Board until 1832. Oversight for the provision of naval transportation then passed to the Department of the Comptroller of Victualling and Transport Services until 1862 when it was transferred to the Board of Admiralty who set up a Transport Department. By 1890 it was renamed as the Department of the Director of Transports. In 1917 once again as the Transport Department it was temporarily absorbed into the Ministry of Shipping, and the Admiralty seconded an officer to the ministry with the title of Director of Transports and Shipping.

In 1916 a Shipping Controller was appointed to regulate merchant shipping for government purposes and to coordinate wartime shipping requirements. A Ministry of Shipping was established following the Defence Regulations of June 1917. The Ministry of Shipping, had responsibility for 'sea transport of military forces and supplies, food and raw materials for industry, Atlantic, Gibraltar and Russian convoys, shipping losses and tonnage requirements, shipbuilding and other matters relating to wartime British and allied control of merchant shipping'.

In 1917, the ministry embarked on a large scale requisitioning scheme of British ships and became responsible for the maintenance and operation of a vast merchant fleet. After the end of the war in November 1918 the main functions of the ministry were the transport of troops, prisoners of war and material back to the United Kingdom, the disposal or release of requisitioned ships, and the reconditioning of vessels for release back to their private owners. The ministry was dissolved on 31 March 1921.

The Ministry of Shipping was reinstated with the outbreak of war in September 1939; it assumed responsibility for specific Sea Transport Department under auspice of the Admiralty till 1941 when it was merged with the Ministry of Transport to form the Ministry of War Transport. In 1946 the Ministry of Transport was reestablished; it then became responsible for naval transportation until 1970 when that responsibility was assumed once more by the Board of Trade.

There were three Ministers of Shipping from 1939 to 1941:

- Sir John Gilmour, 2nd Baronet (13 October 1939 – 30 March 1940) (died)
- Robert Hudson (3 April – 14 May 1940)
- Ronald Cross (14 May 1940 – 1 May 1941)
