= Storekeeper-General of the Navy =

Office of the Storekeeper-General of the Navy
- Department of Admiralty
- Reports to: Third Naval Lord and Controller of the Navy
- Appointer: First Lord of the Admiralty; Subject to formal approval by the Queen-in-Council
- Term length: Not fixed
- Formation: 1829–1869
- First holder: Rear-Admiral: Robert Gambier Middleton
- Final holder: Hon. Robert Saunders Dundas

The Storekeeper-General of the Navy was initially a senior appointment and principal commissioner of the British Navy Board created in 1829. In 1832 the navy board was abolished and this office holder then became a member of the Board of Admiralty until 1869, when his office was abolished and his responsibilities were assumed by the Third Naval Lord and Controller of the Navy.

The office holder was responsible for the administering the Department of the Storekeeper-General of the Navy.

== History ==
This office was established in 1829 as an appointment to the Navy Board. In 1832 following the reforms of the naval service by the First Lord of the Admiralty Sir James Graham he abolished the Navy Board. The Storekeeper-General was one of the five new principal officers who assumed the former responsibilities for the administration of naval stores.

Under instructions agreed with the Board of Admiralty he would be responsible for the maintenance of all stock at the naval depots, acting, and in regard to other shipbuilding materials to work in conjunction with the Surveyor of the Navy. It was his duty to arrange for the purchasing of goods to replenish stock levels and maintain them and for the examination of all store accounts.

In the reorganisation of Admiralty from 1868 to 1869, the office of Storekeeper-General was abolished. His purchasing powers, along with those of the Comptroller of Victualling, were transferred to the a newly created Contract and Purchase Department that was placed under the supervision of a Director of Navy Contracts. The previous store keeping functions were passed to the Controller of the Navy and a new subordinate post was created the Superintendent of Stores, to administer a Naval Stores Department.

== Office holders ==
- 1829–1832, Rear-Admiral: Robert Gambier Middleton.
- 1832–1869, the Hon. Robert Dundas, 4th Viscount Melville.

== Bibliography ==
1. Cave, Edward; Nichols, John (1837). "The Gentleman's Magazine, and Historical Chronicle, for the Year: Obituary". The Gentleman's Magazine. Edw. Cave, 1736-[1868]: 533. Retrieved 13 August 2019.
2. Collinge, J. M. (1978). "Principal Officers and Commissioners. British History Online". www.British-history.ac.uk. London: University of London. pp. 18–22. Retrieved 31 October 2019.
3. Government, HM (1870). Sessional papers. London, England: House of Commons.
4. Hamilton, Admiral Sir Richard, Vesey (1896). "IV: The Director of Stores". Naval administration; the constitution, character, and functions of the Board of admiralty, and of the civil departments it directs. London: G. Bell and Sons.
