= Principal naval transport officer (Royal Navy) =

British naval officer rank

Principal Naval Transport Officer Principal Sea Transport Officer
- Country: United Kingdom
- Service branch: Royal Navy
- Abbreviation: PNTO; PSTO

In the Royal Navy, a principal naval transport officer (P.N.T.O.) later known as principal sea transport officer (P.S.T.O.) is a shore-based flag officer or captain responsible for sea transport duties, and assisting the senior naval officer's area of command in the preparation of naval orders and conduct disembarkations. British Dominion Navies also used the concept.

== History ==
Principal Transport Officers of the Royal Navy had been in existence from at least 1868. The Naval Transports Service was created by the Royal Navy on 22 December 1914. From 1915 to 1916 the Eastern Mediterranean Squadron had a principal naval transport officer based at Mudros who held the rank of commodore. The officers were employed as part of the Naval Transport Service as part of the Department of the Director of Transports. In 1921 the Naval Transport Service was restyled as the Sea Transport Service. of the Sea Transport Department. Naval officers were assigned to postings at various ports and naval bases through to 1970.

== Locations of principal naval transport officers ==
Post Holder	Date(s)	Ref
Principal Naval Transport Officer, Alexandria	1915	
Principal Naval Transport Officer, Archangel	1916	
Principal Naval Transport Officer, Australia	1914	
Principal Naval Transport Officer, Cardiff	1915–1921	
Principal Naval Transport Officer, Egypt	1915–1918	
Principal Naval Transport Officer, East Indies	1931	
Principal Naval Transport Officer, France	1915–1919	
Principal Naval Transport Officer, Le Havre	1914	
Principal Naval Transport Officer, Liverpool	1915–1921	
Principal Naval Transport Officer, Marseilles	1916–1919	
Principal Naval Transport Officer, New Haven	1918–1919	
Principal Naval Transport Officer, Mudros	1915–1916	
Principal Naval Transport Officer, South Africa	1914	
Principal Naval Transport Officer, Southampton	1914–1921	
Principal Naval Transport Officer, St. Nazaire	1916	
Principal Naval Transport Officer, Taranto	1917	

== Locations of principal sea transport officers ==
Post Holder	Date(s)	Ref
Principal Sea Transport Officer, Australia	1946	
Principal Sea Transport Officer, British Army of the Rhine	1946	
Principal Sea Transport Officer, Clyde and Scottish Ports	1940–1946	
Principal Sea Transport Officer, East Indies	1946	
Principal Sea Transport Officer, India	1939–1945	
Principal Sea Transport Officer, Middle East	1939–1945	
Principal Sea Transport Officer, North West Ports	1946	
Principal Sea Transport Officer, South Coast	1946	
Principal Sea Transport Officer, South East Asia Command	1946	
Principal Sea Transport Officer, South East Coast	1946	
Principal Sea Transport Officer, South Wales	1946	

== See also ==
- Divisional transport officer
