= Controller of Victualling Accounts =

Royal Navy civilian officer

Office of the Controller of Victualling Accounts
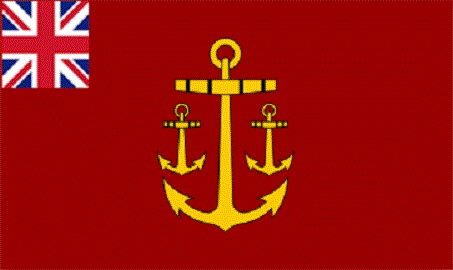
- Flag of the Navy Board shown for illustrative purposes
- Department of the Admiralty
- Member of: Navy Board (1667-1796)
- Appointer: Prime Minister; Subject to formal approval by the King-in-Council
- Term length: Not fixed
- Inaugural holder: Sir William Penn
- Formation: 1667-1796

The Controller of Victualling Accounts also called Comptroller of Victualling Accounts was a civilian officer in the Royal Navy who was also a principal member of the Navy Board from 1667 until 1796, he was responsible for examining the accounts of bills made out by the Victualling Board on behalf of the Navy Board. He was based at the Navy Office. He superintended the Office for Examining Victualling Accounts.

== History ==
The post was created in 1667 to relieve the Comptroller of the Navy of one of his original duties, when the Victualling Board was established in 1683 the controller remained responsible for examining all invoices and payments made of the new board until 1796, when the Navy Board was reconstituted: and the post of the three Controllers of Accounts were abolished along with the Clerk of the Acts. In 1832 when the Navy Board was abolished the responsibility for victualling accounts was absorbed by the Office of Comptroller of Victualling and Transports under the Board of Admiralty until 1869 then that office was also abolished the replaced by the Victualling Department.

== List of controllers of victualling accounts ==
Included:

- Sir William Penn, 16 January 1667 – 16 June 1669
- Sir Jeremiah Smith, 17 June 1669 – 24 November 1675
- Sir Anthony Deane, 25 November 1675 – 28 April 1680
- Sir John Narborough, 29 April 1680 – 11 October 1688
- Sir John Berry, 12 October 1688- 2 May 1690
- Sir Richard Beach, 3 May 1690 – 13 March 1693
- Samuel Pett, 14 March 1693 – 28 February 1699
- Sir Cloudesley Shovell, 1 March 1699 – 3 January 1705
- Benjamin Timewell, 4 January 1705 – 15 November 1714
- Richard Burton, 16 November 1714 – 22 December 1717
- John Fawler, 23 December 1717 – 6 June 1744
- Francis Gashry, 7 June 1744 – 26 July 1747
- Robert Osborn, 27 July 1747 – 21 July 1771
- Charles Proby, 22 July 1771 – 20 December 1771
- Thomas Hanway 21 December 1771 – 27 October 1772
- George Marsh, 28 October 1772 – 15 July 1773
- Captain James Gambier, 16 July 1773- 1 September 1773
- William Palmer, 2 September 1773 – 1796

== Sources ==
- Office-Holders in Modern Britain: Volume 7, Navy Board Officials 1660–1832, ed. J M Collinge (London, 1978), British History Online http://www.british-history.ac.uk/office-holders/vol7 [accessed 25 March 2017].
