= Sea Transport Branch (Board of Trade) =

Historical branch of British Navy

Branch overview
- Formed: 1862
- Preceding Branch: Ministry of Shipping, Sea Transport Division, 1968–1970
- Dissolved: 1970
- Jurisdiction: (United Kingdom)
- Headquarters: Whitehall, London, England
- Branch executive: Director of Sea Transport

The Sea Transport Branch of the British Board of Trade, originally established as the Transport Department or Naval Transport Department, was a logistical branch of the Department of Admiralty responsible for the provision of naval transportation services. It underwent numerous name changes throughout its complicated history with responsibility for sea transportation, known as the Department of the Director of Transports from 1890.

It was temporarily part of the responsibility of the Ministry of Shipping as its Transport Department from 1917 to 1921, though still under the auspice of the Admiralty. It was renamed the Sea Transport Department of the Board of Trade from 1921 to 1941. It then moved then back to the Ministry of Shipping from 1941 to 1946.

Responsibility for naval transportation then became part of the Ministry of War Transport as its Sea Transport Department until 1946, still with co-responsibility with the Admiralty. It continued with the Ministry of Shipping until 1967 when it was renamed the Sea Transport Division and in 1970 it was put under the control of the Board of Trade as the Sea Transport Branch. The branch was administered by the Director of Sea Transport.

== History ==
The origins of the branch began with the Transport Board established in 1686. In 1817 the Transport Board was itself abolished and its responsibilities were then separated between the Navy Board who created its own Transport Branch and the Victualling Board which set up its own Transport Service. In 1832 both the navy and victualling boards were abolished and responsibility for the provision of transport passed to the new Department of the Comptroller of Victualling and Transport Services.

In 1862 the Department of the Comptroller of Victualling and Transport Services role was separated leading to the creation of a separate Transport Department. By 1890 it was renamed as the Department of the Director of Transports. In 1917 the department was temporarily absorbed into the Ministry of Shipping until 1921 when the ministry was abolished. During the previous period the Director of Transports was seconded by the Admiralty to the Ministry of Shipping as its representative restyled as the Director of Transport and Shipping under the Shipping Controller. After the first world war the Transport Department was made part of the Board of Trade's, Mercantile Marine Department as its Sea Transport Department.

In order to deliver the requirements for the provision of naval transportation services for the Admiralty its Directors of the Transport were given joint roles he was appointed head of the Admiralty Department and made an officer of the Board of Trade. The Sea Transport Department remained as part of the Mercantile Marine Department of Board of Trade until 1941.

In 1939 the Ministry of Shipping was reconstituted and in May 1941 it was amalgamated with Ministry of Transport to form the Ministry of War Transport it assumed responsibility for the Sea Transport Department until May 1946. The Ministry of Transport was reestablished in May 1946 at the Sea Transport Department remained a part of the Ministry of Transport under the auspice of Admiralty as stated in official documents until March 1968 when it was renamed the Sea Transport Division. In 1970 it moved back to the Board of Trade where it was renamed as the Sea Transport Branch.

== Responsibilities ==
Ministry of War Transports (1941–1946)

The Sea Transport Department was responsible for all merchant shipping requirements of the armed forces, which gave it control of troop ships, supply ships, hospital ships, Fleet Auxiliaries including armed merchant cruisers, naval stores and munitions ships, rescue ships, ocean boarding vessels, and tugs. It also controlled the recruitment of civilian crewmen.

== Admiralty administration ==
Included:

=== Director of Transports ===
1. Rear-Admiral William R. Mends: April 1862-April 1883
2. Rear-Admiral Sir Francis W. Sullivan: April 1883-August 1888
3. Rear-Admiral Harry W. Brent: August 1888-October 1898
4. Captain Boverie F. Clark: October 1898 – 1899
5. Rear-Admiral Boverie F. Clark: October 1899 – 1901
6. Rear-Admiral George T.H. Boyes: 1902-1905
7. Vice-Admiral George T.H. Boyes: 1906–1907 (retd)
8. Vice-Admiral Robert L. Groome: November 1907-December 1911
9. Rear-Admiral Herbert W. Savory: December 1911-November 1914

==== Assistant Director of Transports ====
Included:

1. W. F. Baughan 1888-1894
2. S. J. Graff 1896-1906

==== Civil Assistant Director of Transports ====
1. S. J. Graff 1902-1906

==== Naval Assistant to the Director of Transports ====
Included:

1. Captain W. A. De V.Brownlow 1888-1896
2. Captain Francis J. Pitt 1896-1903
3. Captain W. Mac C. Maturin 1903-1906
4. Captain (retired) Hubert Stansbury, 1 April 1915 – early 1917
5. Commodore, Second Class George P. Bevan, 1 April 1918 – November, 1919

==== Consulting Officer for Indian Troop Service ====
Included:

1. Captain A. W. Chitty I.N. 1888-1892

Post was abolished by 1898.

==== Inspectors of Shipping ====
Included:

1. Edward G. Farrell and W. H. Johns R.N. 1888-1895

==== Chief Inspector of Shipping ====
Included:

1. Edward G. Farrell 1896-1906

==== Structure of the Transport Department ====
At various ports both in the United Kingdom and overseas responsibility for the provision of transportation service lay with appointed officials called a Principal Naval Transport Officer or a Divisional Transport Officer these positions were often filled by a retired officer – as conditions required - though not always.

Ports and Stations

1. Avonmouth
2. Cape Town - Resident Transport Officer, Cape Town
3. Cardiff - Superintending Transport Officer at Cardiff
4. Dunkirk
5. Durban - Divisional Transport Officer, Durban
6. Dieppe
7. Liverpool - Admiralty Transport Officer, Liverpool
8. Mudros - Principal Naval Transport Officer, Mudros
9. Newcastle
10. Newhaven
11. Port of London
12. Rouen
13. Salonika - Principal Naval Transport Officer, Salonika and a Divisional Transport Officer, Salonika.
14. Southampton - Admiralty Transport Officer, Southampton
15. Taranto

== Ministry of Shipping administration ==
=== Director of Transport and Shipping ===
This officer was seconded by the Admiralty to the ministry of shipping as its representative under the Shipping Controller.

1. Graeme Thompson, Esq., C.B. October, 1917-October 1918.
2. B. A. Kemball. Cook: October 1918 – 1921.

== Board of Trade administration ==
=== Director of Sea Transport ===
This officer was seconded by the Admiralty to the ministry of shipping as its representative under the Board of Trade.

1. W. G. Hynard, Esq., C.B. CBE, 1939

== Ministry of War Transport administration ==
=== Director of Sea Transport ===
1. Sir Ralph Metcalfe, 1941-1946

==== Naval Assistant to the Director of Sea Transport ====
1. Rear-Admiral A. Poland, 1945-1946

==== Professional Advisors to the Director of Sea Transport ====
1. Commodore, R. Harrison 1941-1946
2. Commodore Engineer, J. C. McGuire 1941-1946

==== Structure of department ====
As of July 1946 consisted of:

Branches and Sections

1. Technical Branch under the superintendence of a Principal Technical Officer
2. Technical Costings Section under the superintendence of a Principal Technical Costings Officer
3. Security Branch under the superintendence of a Rear-Admiral (Rtd).

Transport Officers
These were Principal Sea Transport Officers holding the rank of Commodore through to Vice-Admiral some active serving officers others retired.

== Timeline ==
As listed under headings in Royal Navy Lists:

1. Navy Board, Transport Board, 1686-1817
2. Navy Board, Transport Branch, 1817-1832
3. Board of Admiralty, Comptroller of Victualling and Transport Services, 1832-1862
4. Board of Admiralty, Transport Department, 1862-1916
5. Ministry of Shipping, Transport Department, 1917-1921
6. Board of Trade, Mercantile Marine Department, Sea Transport Department, 1921–41
7. Ministry of War Transport, Sea Transport Department, 1941-1946
8. Ministry of Shipping, Sea Transport Department, 1946-1967
9. Ministry of Shipping, Sea Transport Division, 1968-1970
10. Board of Trade, Sea Transport Branch, 1970

== Sources ==
1. Admiralty, Great Britain (June 1890). The Navy List. London, England: HM Stationery Office.
2. Admiralty, Great Britain (March 1892). The Navy List. London, England: HM Stationery Office.
3. Admiralty, Great Britain (March 1896). The Navy List. London, England: HM Stationery Office.
4. Admiralty, Great Britain (October 1898). The Navy List. London, England: HM Stationery Office.
5. Brown, David (2013). The Royal Navy and the Mediterranean: Vol.I: September 1939 - October 1940. Oxford, England: Routledge. ISBN 9781135281540.
6. Hamilton, Sir Vesey (1896). Naval Administration. London England: George Bell and Son.
7. Harley, Simon; Lovell, Tony (2018). "Director of Transports (Royal Navy) - The Dreadnought Project". www.dreadnoughtproject.org. Harley and Lovell.
8. McMillan, Richard (2006). The British Occupation of Indonesia: 1945–1946: Britain, The Netherlands and the Indonesian Revolution. Oxford, England: Routledge. ISBN 9781134254286.
9. "Records of Transport Departments" (1773–1868). nationalarchives.gov.uk. National Archives UK.
10. Whitaker, Joseph (1894). An Almanack for the Year of Our Lord ... London, England: J. Whitaker.
