= Thomas Oloff de Wet =

Captain Thomas Oloff de Wet CBE
- Born: 26 February 1869; Dublin
- Died: 30 March 1940 (aged 71); St Albans
- Military career
- Allegiance: United Kingdom
- Rank: Captain
- Awards: CBE

Captain Thomas Oloff de Wet CBE (26 February 1869 – 30 March 1940) was a Senior British Officer in the Royal Navy. He was Principal Naval Transport Officer during the evacuation of Constantinople in 1923, Principal Sea Transport Officer in North China in 1927 and Officer in Charge of Sea Transport in Egypt between 1924 and 1926 and again between 1928 and 1933.

== Life ==
Thomas Oloff de Wet was born in Dublin on 26 February 1869, the son of Major G. Oloff de Wet. He received his education at Bedford Modern School and thereafter on HMS Worcester. In his final year on HMS Worcester a 'letter was read from Her Majesty presenting the usual gold medal for the cadet "likely to become the finest sailor," and this had been awarded to Thomas Oloff de Wet, who had also won the sextant given by the Elder Brethren of the Trinity House.'

In 1887, de Wet was indentured in the Merchant Navy and in 1892 was made First Mate. In 1895, he was made a Sub-Lieutenant in the Royal Naval Reserve, rising to the rank of Lieutenant in 1896. By 1911 de Wet was a retired Captain of the Royal Navy and in January 1914 he was granted Freedom of the City of London.

At the outbreak of the first World War, de Wet returned to service; he was mentioned in despatches and awarded the CBE for valuable services as Divisional Naval Transport Officer in Vancouver. Continuing in service, he was subsequently Principal Naval Transport Officer during the evacuation of Constantinople in 1923, Principal Sea Transport Officer in North China in 1927 and Officer in Charge of Sea Transport in Egypt between 1924 and 1926 and again between 1928 and 1933.

De Wet married Elizabeth (née Bradstreet) in 1896 and they had a son (H W A O de Wet, educated at Monkton Combe School and imprisoned in Germany as a spy during World War 2) and two daughters. He died on 30 March 1940 at Marlborough House in St Albans, England.
