= DESTO =

DESTO and/or Desto may refer to:

- DESTO (Pakistan), the Defence Science and Technology Organization
- Desto Records, a defunct American classical music record label based in New York active 1964-1982
- Dr. Desto, a villain in the Hanna Barbera cartoon Samson & Goliath
- Desto (Pty) Ltd, a company registered in South Africa in 1994, that provides Education, Training and Development and Consulting and Recruitment Services

== See also ==
- DSTO (disambiguation)
