= James Brooks (civil servant) =

British civil servant (1863–1941)

Sir James Henry Brooks KCB (15 April 1863 – 13 October 1941) was a British civil servant in the Admiralty.

== Early life and education ==
Brooks was born in Kenwyn House, Seychelles, where his father, James Henry Brooks, was a doctor in Mahé. He was educated at Charterhouse School.

== Career ==
He joined the Admiralty as a higher division clerk in the Controller's Department in May 1883. In 1885 he was transferred to Portsmouth Dockyard, but returned to London nine months later in February 1886 as Private Secretary to the Junior Naval Lord and spent the rest of his career in Whitehall. He became Private Secretary to the Second Sea Lord in 1893, second-in-charge of the Legal and Naval Law Branch in January 1901, head of the Appointments Branch in 1906, and head of the Naval Branch of the Secretary's Department in 1907.

In 1911, he was appointed to the post of Director of Victualling, which he was to hold until his retirement in 1923. It was an unusual appointment, as Brooks had no previous service in the Victualling Department, but he proved himself successfully throughout the First World War. The Victualling Department provided food, clothing, cooking and messing equipment, toiletries, tobacco and books to the Royal Navy, and was thus vital to the successful operation of the fleet. The department's total budget during the war was approximately £45 million.

Brooks was appointed Companion of the Order of the Bath (CB) in the 1909 Birthday Honours and Knight Commander of the Order of the Bath (KCB) in the 1920 New Year War Honours. He was also awarded the American Navy Distinguished Service Medal for his war service.

== Death ==
He died in Wimborne, Dorset, aged 78.
