= Naval transport officer (Royal Navy) =

Officer rank in the navy of the United Kingdom

In the Royal Navy, a naval transport officer is a shore-based naval officer responsible to the divisional transport officer for the fast and safe discharge of vessels of transports, In addition he is responsible for maintaining communications with the master of the ship and the officer commanding any troops on board.
