= Kenwyn House, Mahé =

Historical building in Mahé, Seychelles

Kenwyn House
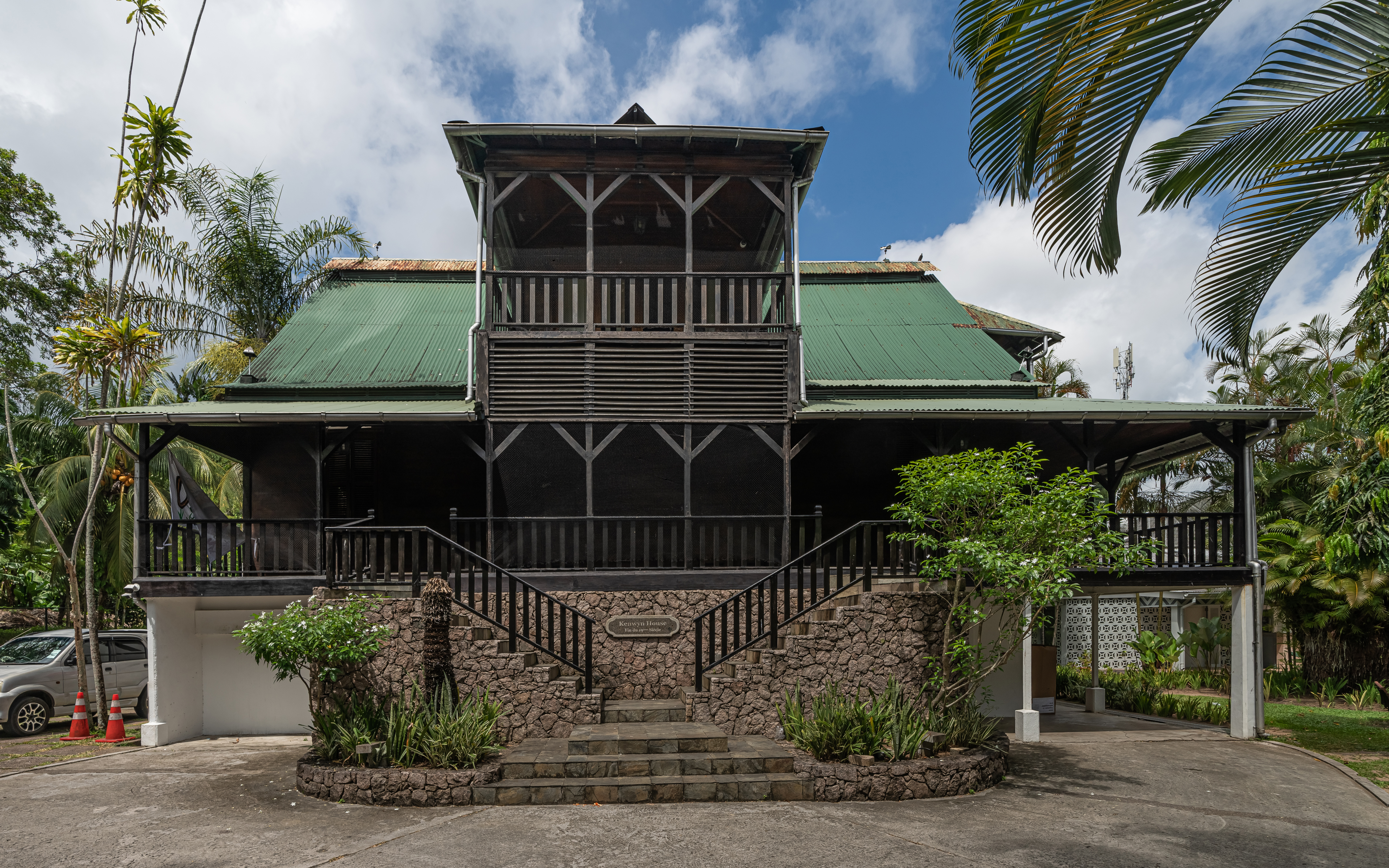
- Interactive map of the Kenwyn House area

General information
- Architectural style: French colonial architecture
- Location: Mahé, Seychelles
- Coordinates: 4.626321°S 55.453771°E
- Named for: Kenwyn in Cornwall, England
- Construction started: 1855

Kenwyn House is a historic colonial mansion in Mahé, Seychelles.

== History ==
The mansion was built in 1855. British Diplomat Sir James Henry Brooks was born and lived there until 1878 or 1879, and later it was sold by his father to the Eastern Telegraphic Company. The company housed their engineers during cable installation. Named after a Cornish village supplying the cables, the house later served as a residence for the company’s general managers.

In 1984, Kenwyn House was declared a National Monument. The architecture of the mansion is French Colonial style, now an integral part of island's Creole architecture.

In 2018, the mansion was renovated by Gran Kaz after leasing it from Cable & Wireless plc, the current owner of the property.
