= Thomas Tassell Grant =

British inventor (1795–1859)

Sir Thomas Tassell Grant KCB FRS (1795-15 October 1859) was an inventor in the 19th century.

He was born in Portsea, Portsmouth, the son of a namesake and his wife Ann (née Tassell) of Soberton, Hampshire.

In 1829 he invented steam-powered machinery for making ship's biscuits that were stamped into hexagonal shapes, thereby ensuring that there was no waste. This process speeded up the production process and substantially reduced its costs. Other government departments copied the invention, saving the British taxpayer a great deal of money. As a reward Grant was given a £2,000 grant by parliament and received a medal from the French king, Louis Philippe, and a gold medal from the Society of Arts in London.

In 1834 he invented a desalination plant which distilled fresh water at sea and was described by the Times in 1859 as "the greatest benefit ever conferred on the sailor, materially advancing the sanitary and moral condition of the navy". Installed on HMS Wye it produced 10,000 gallons a day during the Crimean War.

According to the Oxford Dictionary of National Biography, Grant's other inventions included "a naval fuel (briquettes known as Grant's Patent Fuel), and a steam kitchen, which was given its first trials in the warship HMS Illustrious. He also constructed a new type of lifebuoy, and a feathering paddle wheel.

He became a prominent member of the Royal Society, having been elected a Fellow in 1840. In 1850 he was promoted to the comptrollership of the Admiralty's victualling and transport service.

The outbreak of the Crimean War in 1854 tested Grant a great deal. However, his inventions helped to offset the widely condemned shortcomings of the war-time supply arrangements for the forces.

Grant was knighted for his achievements, and Queen Victoria presented him with a gold and silver vase. He died of cancer in London on 15 October 1859. The Oxford Dictionary of National Biography remarked, "Despite the marked improvements they bestowed on the quality of the beneficiaries' lives, Grant's inventions were perhaps too homely to receive the mention they deserved in the histories of technology." He died at his house in Regents Park, London.

He had married Emma. They had two sons: Vice-admiral William Burley Grant and Richard Tassell Grant. His granddaughter Hilda Lucy Grant married Sir Charles Seely, 2nd Baronet in 1891.

== Other ==
- List of Fellows of the Royal Society G, H, I
