= Naval Stores Department (Royal Navy) =

United Kingdom Naval department

Agency overview
- Formed: 1869
- Preceding agency: Department of the Storekeeper-General of the Navy
- Dissolved: 1966
- Superseding agency: Royal Naval Supply and Transport Service
- Jurisdiction: Government of the United Kingdom
- Headquarters: Admiralty; London
- Agency executives: Director of Naval Stores; Deputy Director of Naval Stores; Assistant Director of Naval Stores
- Parent department: Department of Admiralty (1869-1964); Navy Department (1964-1966)

The Naval Stores Department also known as the Department of the Director of Naval Stores was initially a subsidiary department of the British Department of Admiralty, then later the Navy Department responsible for managing and maintaining naval stores and the issuing of materials at naval dockyards and establishments for the building, fitting and repairing of Royal Navy warships from 1869 to 1966.

== History ==
The Naval Stores Department was first established in April 1869 initially and was initially placed under the control of a Superintendent of Stores as head of the department, He assumed the former store keeping and distribution duties previously administered by the Department of the Storekeeper-General of the Navy whose post was abolished following a reorganisation within the Admiralty. In 1876 the title of superintendent of stores was renamed as to the Director of Stores.

The Naval Stores Department was responsible for the storing and provisioning of materiel stores for the Royal Navy, and for supplying all naval establishments and yards at both home and abroad including all foreign stations. It managed the stores for the Department of the Director of Dockyards, the Department of the Director of Naval Construction and the Naval Ordnance Department including all Royal Naval Colleges and Royal Naval Engineering Colleges. This department was overseen by the Third Sea Lord.

In 1961 the Victualling Department was merged into the Naval Stores Department, but remained an autonomous department within it. In 1964 the department survived unification of the Admiralty into the new Ministry of Defence until 1966 when it was integrated with three other departments for (Armament Supply, Movements and Victualling) to form the new Royal Naval Supply and Transport Service as part of the MOD Navy Department.

== Directors duties ==
Included:

- Issue stores for all ships both in commission and reserve.
- Issue stores for naval dockyards both at home and abroad.
- Manage all stores and storage facilities for the Department of Dockyards.
- Manage all stores and storage facilities for the Department of Naval Construction.
- Manage all stores and storage facilities for the Department of Naval Ordnance.
- Manage all stores and storage facilities for Royal Naval and Engineering Colleges.
- Prepare all estimates for the department.
- Pass departments purchase requests to the Director of Navy Contracts.
- Receive stores for royal naval vessels both in commission and reserve.
- Regularly examine all stores accounts and financial transactions.
- Superintend the department including all supporting staff heads.

== Heads of Department ==
Included:

=== Superintendents of Naval Stores ===
- Mr. Nelson Girdlestone, 13 April 1869 – 23 January 1872
- Mr. Coghlan McLean Hardy, 23 January 1872– 1876

=== Directors of Naval Stores ===
- Mr. Coghlan McLean Hardy., 1876 – 1 April 1889
- Mr. William G. P. Gilbert., 1 April 1889 – 1 April 1895
- Mr. Gordon William Miller, 1 April 1895 – 1900
- Mr. David Evans, 1900- May 1902
- Sir. Frederick W. Black, 1902 – 1906
- Sir John Forsey, 1906 - 1914
- Mr Mark Manley Waller, 1914 - 1918
- Mr G. H, Ashdown, 1919 - 1921
- Mr J. W L. Oliver, 1921 - 1926
- Sir William J Gick 1935 - 1940
- Mr. Ernest Stephen Wood 1940 - 1951
- Mr. G. F. R. Marsh, 1951 - 1956
- Mr R. Henderson 1956 - 1959
- Mr F. C. Wilkins 1962 -1964

== Structure of Department ==
Included:

- Office of the Deputy Director of Naval Stores
  - Office of the Assistant Director of Naval Stores
    - Departments of the Senior Naval Store Officers, Yards
    - Offices of the Superintending Naval Store Officers Depots

Departments of the Senior Naval Store Officers, Yards at.

- Department of the Senior Naval Store Officer, Bermuda Yard.
- Department of the Senior Naval Store Officer, Chatham Yard.
- Department of the Senior Naval Store Officer, Deptford Yard.
- Department of the Senior Naval Store Officer, Devonport Yard.
- Department of the Senior Naval Store Officer, Gibraltar Yard.
- Department of the Senior Naval Store Officer, Haulbowline Yard.
- Department of the Senior Naval Store Officer, Lyness Yard.
- Department of the Senior Naval Store Officer, Malta Yard.
- Department of the Senior Naval Store Officer, Pembroke Yard.
- Department of the Senior Naval Store Officer, Portland Yard.
- Department of the Senior Naval Store Officer, Portsmouth Yard.
- Department of the Senior Naval Store Officer, Rosyth Yard.
- Department of the Senior Naval Store Officer, Scapa Flow Yard.
- Department of the Senior Naval Store Officer, Sheerness Flow Yard.
- Department of the Senior Naval Store Officer, Simonstown Yard.
- Department of the Senior Naval Store Officer, Singapore Yard.
- Department of the Senior Naval Store Officer, Trincomalee Yard.

Offices of the Superintending Naval Store Officers at:

- Naval Store Depot, Almond Bank.
- Naval Store Depot, Carfin.
- Naval Store Depot, Copenacre.
- Naval Store Depot, Coventry.
- Naval Store Depot, West India Docks.
- Naval Store Depot, Eaglescliffe.
- Naval Store Depot, Lathalmond.
- Naval Store Depot, Llangennech.
- Naval Store Depot, Londonderry.
- Naval Store Depot, Park Royal.
- Naval Store Depot, Trecwn.
- Naval Store Depot, Woolston.

Note: The Victualling Department was amalgamated with the Naval Stores Department in 1961 but remained autonomous under the control of the Director of Victualling.

- Victualling Department

== Timeline ==
- Navy Board, Controller of Storekeepers Accounts, 1671-1796
- Navy Board, Stores Department, 1796-1829
- Navy Board, Store-Keeper General of the Navy, 1829-1832
- Board of Admiralty, Department of the Store-Keeper General of the Navy, 1832-1869
- Board of Admiralty, Superintendent of Stores, 1869-1876
- Board of Admiralty, Director of Naval Stores, 1876-1966

== Sources ==
- Hamilton, Sir Vesey (1896). "IV". The Constitution, Character and Functions of the Board of Admiralty and the Civil Departments it Directs. George Bell and Sons. ISBN 9781150465000.
- Puddefoot, Geoff (2010). Ready For Anything: The Royal Fleet Auxiliary 1905–1950. Seaforth Publishing. ISBN 9781848320741.
- Rodger, N.A.M. (1979). The Admiralty. Offices of State. Lavenham: T. Dalton. ISBN 0900963948.
