= Ministry of War Transport =

Department of the government of the United Kingdom, 1941–1946

Department overview
- Formed: 1 May 1941
- Preceding agencies: Ministry of Shipping; Ministry of Transport
- Dissolved: April 1946
- Superseding Department: Ministry of Transport
- Jurisdiction: Government of the United Kingdom
- Ministers responsible: Frederick Leathers (1 May 1941 – 3 August 1945); Alfred Barnes (3 August 1945 – April 1946)
- Department executive: Cyril Hurcomb, Permanent Secretary

The Ministry of War Transport (MoWT) was a department of the British Government formed early in the Second World War to control transportation policy and resources. It was formed by merging the Ministry of Shipping and the Ministry of Transport, bringing responsibility for both shipping and land transport to a single department, and easing problems of co-ordination of transport in wartime.

The MoWT was founded on 1 May 1941, when Lord Leathers was appointed Minister of War Transport. Following the general election of July 1945, Alfred Barnes was appointed Minister of War Transport, remaining in the post after the department was renamed the Ministry of Transport in April 1946.

== Divisions ==
The jurisdiction of the MoWT covered all forms of transportation and it inherited numerous and varied responsibilities from its parent organisations. From the Ministry of Shipping these included:

- Allocation of Tonnage Division, responsible for the provision of shipping, other than liners, but including tankers and other coastal craft. This division was headed by Max Nicholson from 1942 to 1945.
- Ship Management Division, responsible for the City Central Chartering Office, which chartered vessels on behalf of the government on the Baltic Exchange in London and abroad.
- Coal Division, ensured the provision of bunkering facilities at home and abroad for the use of controlled merchant shipping.
- Coasting and Short Sea Shipping Division, responsible for the control of shipping in home waters.
- Commercial Services Division, responsible for reviewing the requirements of government departments needing to convey commodities essential for military, civil or industrial needs, and arranging tonnage provision.
- Foreign Shipping Relations Division, responsible for negotiations for the use of foreign ships and policy towards foreign and neutral shipping.
- General (Shipping) Division, responsible for war risks insurance, the tonnage replacement scheme and general shipping matters.
- Liner Division, responsible for the operation of the liner requisition scheme.
- Sea Transport Division (in official Royal Navy sources known as the Sea Transport Department), responsible for all merchant shipping requirements of the armed forces, which gave it control of troop ships, supply ships, hospital ships, Fleet Auxiliaries including armed merchant cruisers, naval stores and munitions ships, rescue ships, ocean boarding vessels, and tugs. It also controlled the recruitment of civilian crewmen.
- Ship Management Division, concerned with the management of ships owned, requisitioned or seized by the department through various ship owners.
- Shipping Operations Control Division, responsible for the requisitioning, chartering and allocation of British merchant shipping; the reconciliation of import demands with shipping capacity; the acquisition and chartering of Allied and neutral vessels and the associated Shipping Agreements between the British and foreign Governments. The division was also responsible for co-ordination with the United States War Shipping Administration through the Ministry's British Merchant Shipping Mission, based in Washington D.C., and the Combined Shipping Adjustment Boards set up in London and Washington in 1942 to allow the UK and US authorities to provide the most effective use of their shipping resources in the transportation of goods, raw materials, and war materiel to the front line. Co-operation with Allied and other Governments was developed further towards the end of the war with the establishment of the United Maritime Authority.
- Tanker Division, responsible for the transport of fuel oil, molasses, whale oil and palm oil by tanker and for liaison with other concerned government departments.
- War Risks Insurance Office, responsible for the management of the scheme of marine insurance against losses of merchant ships on government service.

In 1942 new divisions were created responsible for ship repairs and concerned with statistics and intelligence. After the end of the war in May 1945, those divisions not dissolved or absorbed by other divisions, gradually assumed duties in connection with peacetime shipping policy.

From the Ministry of Transport it inherited responsibility for all of Britain's roads, railways, canals and ports, and included:

- Railways Division, responsible for processing and publicising instructions and disseminating information, to ensure effective co-operation between the various railway companies, whose senior officials were formed into the Railway Executive Committee.
- Railway Inspectorate, responsible for safety provisions, track inspection, accident investigation, and operating system inspection of the railways.
- Road Transport Division, responsible for the licensing of public service vehicles and their drivers, and goods vehicles; the regulation of the construction, lighting and use of motor vehicles; speed limits; vehicle registration and taxation; and compulsory insurance.
- Highways Division, responsible for the safety of road transport, private vehicle registration and licensing, traffic safety and traffic control.
- Highway Engineering Division, responsible for road building and repairs.
- Road Haulage Organisation, responsible for the voluntary agreements made with haulage operators to economise in the use of fuel and rubber, to maintain a fleet of long distance vehicles, and to ensure the most effective use of road transport resources.
- Marine Departments, responsible for docks, ports and harbours.
- His Majesty's Coastguard was under the control of the Admiralty from May 1940, but was placed under MoWT control in October 1945.

The Middle East Supply Center was an Anglo-American agency that had complete control over the flow of civilian supplies to the Middle East during the war. It was created by the British in April 1941 starting in Egypt, Palestine and Syria, reporting to the Ministry of War Transport.

== See also ==
- Churchill war ministry
- Parliamentary Secretary to the Ministry of Transport
- Empire ship
