= DSTO =

DSTO may refer to:

- Defence Science and Technology Organisation, Australia, now Defence Science and Technology Group
- Defence Science and Technology Organization, Pakistan
- Defence Survive, Evade, Resist, Extract Training Organisation, United Kingdom
- Dual Stage To Orbit/Double Stage To Orbit, a spacecraft in which two distinct stages provide propulsion consecutively in order to achieve orbital velocity
- Divisional sea transport officer, a naval officer responsible for transport.
- Dwarka Sector 21 metro station, Delhi, India, by Delhi Metro station code
