= Department of the Storekeeper-General of the Navy =

Former department in the British Royal Navy

Department overview
- Formed: 1829
- Dissolved: 1869
- Superseding Department: Department of the Superintendent of Naval Stores
- Jurisdiction: Government of the United Kingdom
- Headquarters: Admiralty London
- Department executives: Storekeeper-General of the Navy
- Parent department: Department of Admiralty

The Department of the Storekeeper-General of the Navy was initially the Navy Office department responsible for the storing and supply of naval stores to the Royal Navy established in 1829. In 1832 the Navy Board and subsequently Navy Office was abolished, and their duties were absorbed into the Department of Admiralty.

The department was controlled and directed by the Storekeeper-General of the Navy.

== History ==
The Department of the Storekeeper-General of the Navy, was initially the Navy Office department responsible for the storing and supply of naval stores to the British Royal Navy established in 1829. In 1832 the Navy Board and subsequently Navy Office was abolished, and its duties were absorbed into the Department of Admiralty. The department continued to exist until 1869 when it was renamed the Department of the Superintendent of Naval Stores.

== Bibliography ==
1. 'Alphabetical list of officials: K-Z', in Office-Holders in Modern Britain: Volume 7, Navy Board Officials 1660–1832, ed. J M Collinge (London, 1978), pp. 116–152. British History Online. 116-152 [accessed 31 October 2019].
2. Government, HM (1851). The London Gazette. London, England.: T. Neuman.
3. 'Principal officers and commissioners', in Office-Holders in Modern Britain: Volume 7, Navy Board Officials 1660–1832, ed. J M Collinge (London, 1978), British History Online. 18-25 [accessed 31 October 2019].
