= Transport Board (Royal Navy) =

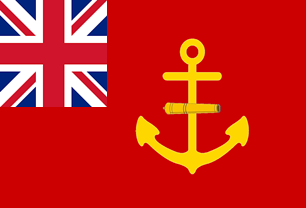
- The Flag of the Transport Board and later Transport Branch in 1832

Agency overview
- Formed: 1690-1724, 1794-1817
- Jurisdiction: Kingdom of England Kingdom of Great Britain
- Headquarters: Dorset Square, Canon Row, Westminster, London
- Agency executive: Commissioners for Transportation
- Parent agency: HM Treasury

The Transport Board was a British government organisation responsible periodically (between the late 17th and early 19th centuries) for the overseas transport of troops and horses, arms and ammunition, naval and military supplies, provisions and other items. It is also referred to as the Board of Transport and the Transport Office.

The Board existed between 1690 and 1724, and again between 1794 and 1817. In both these periods it was constituted and functioned as a subsidiary board of HM Treasury, but at the same time it had a necessarily close working relationship with the Admiralty, being staffed by naval officers and funded through the Naval Estimate.

Latterly the Board took on additional responsibilities: for the transportation of convicts, for the care and custody of prisoners of war and for the care of sick and wounded seamen.

== History ==
=== The first Board (1689-1724) ===
The Board originated in the need to transport the British Army to Ireland to meet the Jacobite invasion of Ireland. Responsibility for the transportation of troops rested with the Lords Commissioners of the Treasury, who in 1689 were required promptly to ship over 23,000 men and 4,000 horses (to be mustered in Liverpool) across the Irish Sea. They sought to devolve this responsibility; the Navy Board, however, was too busy with its statutory duties to take on additional work, so instead the Admiralty (by order of the King) designated three captains to serve as commissioners to make the necessary arrangements, supported by a small administrative team. They hired flyboats and fitted them up with cabins for the higher ranks and hammocks for the rest; the owners of the vessels provided the crew. The following year, the arrangement was formalised by an Order in Council (dated 6 February) which created a Commission for Transportation made up of eight commissioners.

In 1702 the board was formally dissolved; nevertheless, two of its commissioners were retained in order to address the needs for transportation during the ongoing War of the Spanish Succession. Troops were conveyed from Portsmouth to Spain and the Mediterranean, and from Harwich to Flanders and Holland. A third Commissioner was engaged in 1705, before the board was fully reconstituted by letters patent in 1710.

In 1717 the board was reduced in size, before being abolished in 1724.

=== Interim years (1724-1794) ===
The Board was not again reconstituted until the mid-1790s. In the meantime, during periods of conflict the Navy Board, the Victualling Commissioners and the Board of Ordnance would all hire merchant ships to convey supplies to theatres of war as required; while the conveyance of troops remained in the hands of the Treasury commissioners until 1779 (at which point they delegated this responsibility to the Navy Board). Having different boards competing with each other for available vessels led to increased costs and reduced efficiency: problems which became particularly acute during the War of American Independence. The pressures caused by this division of responsibilities, and abuses that followed, led the Comptroller of the Navy, Sir Charles Middleton (later Lord Barham), to lobby for consolidation of all transport provisions under the supervision of the Navy Board.

=== The second board (1794 to 1817) ===
On 4 July 1794 a new Transport Board (formally the Commissioners for Conducting His Majesty's Transport Service) was established, to centralise and unify the functions of military transportation overseas; it was also given responsibility for the shipping of convicts to Australia. In spite of Middleton's lobbying, the reconstituted Board was not made answerable to the Navy Board, but was once again under the Treasury.

The board was given a broad range of duties, namely:

“the hiring and appropriating of Ships and Vessels for the conveyance of Troops and Baggage, Victualling, Ordnance, Barrack, Commissariat, Naval and Military Stores of all kinds, Convicts and Stores to New South Wales and a variety of miscellaneous services such as the provision of Stores and a great variety of Articles for the Military Department in Canada and many Articles of Stores for the Cape of Good Hope and other Stations”.

==== Commissioners of the Transport Board ====
The Board, which directly co-ordinated the work of the Transport service, initially consisted of three Commissioners: two naval captains (Hugh Cloberry Christian and Philip Patton) and one civilian (Ambrose Serle). They established a headquarters in Dover Square, Westminster (just off Canon Row), where the Board met daily (except on Sundays) to receive reports and accounts, issue instructions and plan operations. The Commissioners were supported by a Secretary and a number of administrative clerks.

The captains were both promoted to Rear Admiral the following year, and therefore left the Board. Christian was replaced as chairman, in August 1795, by Captain Rupert George, who would remain in office for just under twenty-two years (he declined promotion to flag rank and continued to chair the Board until its dissolution). Two additional Commissioners were appointed towards the end of 1795, as the Board took on oversight of prisoners of war from the Sick and Hurt Commissioners.

In 1802, peace having been declared, the number of commissioners was again reduced to three; but one more was added (a physician, John Harness M.D.) in 1806 when the Sick and Hurt Board was abolished and the Transport Board took over its remaining responsibilities (which included the administration of Royal Naval Hospitals and hospital ships, and the examination of naval surgeons).

Those who served as Commissioners included future admirals John Schank (1795-1802), James Bowen (1803-1817), William Albany Otway (1795-1803), George Henry Towry (1806-1808) and Courtenay Boyle (1809-1817).

==== Agents for Transports ====
The Board maintained Resident Agents at certain British ports and at those foreign ports that transports frequented. They were responsible for keeping track of the arrival and departure of transports at their station, for ensuring that the ships were duly prepared and provisioned, for supervising the embarkation and disembarkation of troops and horses, and for following the directions of the Board in any other regard. The Resident Agents were naval officers: Captains were posted at Deptford and Portsmouth; Lieutenants at most of the other stations (which in 1815 included Cork, Cowes, Deal, Dublin, Gravesend, Leith, Liverpool, Plymouth and Sheerness).

The board also employed 'Agents afloat' who travelled with the transports. For longer sea voyages there would often be one Agent for every ten transports; for shorter journeys (e.g. to the Mediterranean) the ratio might be one for every twenty. These transport agents represented the first quasi-professional specialization among commissioned officers. The transport agents were uniformed Navy officers under the employ of the Transport Board, but not being sea officers, were not subject to naval discipline. Their job was to control and organize merchant ships that the government had chartered. To assist them in their duties, agents had a staff consisting of a purser, boatswain, gunner, and carpenter, all appointed by warrant and on Navy pay.

Hired vessels with a transport agent (always a Royal Navy Lieutenant but termed a Commander) aboard flew a blue ensign and a "plain blue common pendant" and could exercise authority over smaller transports that carried no Agent. In the case of a large convoys, one vessel would carry a "Principal Agent" (Commander or Captain RN) with a "Blue Broad Pendant" at the main-top-mast head. In the absence of a naval escort, the Principal Agent was in charge of the convoy.

At Deptford, where the Board had its main Transport Yard, there were stationed (in addition to the Resident Agent) an Inspecting Agent, a Shipwright Officer and a Storekeeper, who between them were responsible for assessing, converting and equipping each ship seconded for service.

==== Vessels ====
The Board generally hired merchant vessels to fulfil its requirements (though smaller consignments of stores were sometimes sent as freight via established shipping routes). Ships were usually sourced by a broker, and contracted to serve as a transport for a set number of months. The owners were normally required to present the vessel at Deptford in the first instance, on or by a specific date, in good repair, equipped for duty and with a set complement of men and boys (the number being dependant on the tonnage of the ship: usually five men and one boy for each 100 tons). The ship's Master would thenceforward be answerable to the Board and its representatives for the duration of the contract.

At Deptford the ships were inspected, valued and generally made ready for service. A vessel might be required to serve as a troop-ship, a horse-ship, a cartel or convict-ship, a victualler, ordnance store-ship, naval store-ship or miscellaneous 'carrier'; for each category there were different requirements and stipulations. Transports were required to be armed with a dozen guns minimum (six carriage guns, 'not less than three-pounders', and six swivels).

The transports would normally travel in convoy, under the protection either of a naval escort or of one or more 'armed transports' (which were naval vessels that had been loaned to the Board for the purpose of convoy protection; they operated with a reduced naval crew under the command of an Agent of the Transport Board).

=== Dissolution and aftermath (1817 to 1862) ===
In 1817, the Transport Board was abolished and its duties being divided between the Navy Board, which set up its own Transport Branch, and the Victualling Board, which took over the medical commissioner as well as setting up its own Transport Service. When the Navy and Victualling Boards were abolished in 1832 transport duties were assigned to the Victualling Department. Then in 1861 a select committee of the House of Commons that contained both Navy and Army officers, recommended unanimously the formation of a separate and distinct Transport Office under the sole control of the Lords Commissioners of the Admiralty "To carry out transport of every kind required by our government to any part of our coast and to all our colonies and possessions, including India". In 1862 the responsibility for the provision of transportation was divided and a separate Director of Transports appointed who headed a new Transport Department.

== Timeline ==
Note: Below is a timeline of responsibility for transportation for the Royal Navy.

- Navy Board, Victualling Board (Board of Victualling Commissioners), 1683-1793
- Navy Board, Transport Board, 1794-1816
- Navy Board, Transport Branch, 1817-1832
- Board of Admiralty, Comptroller of Victualling and Transport Services, 1832-1861
- Board of Admiralty, Transport Department, 1862-1917

== See also ==
- Penal transportation
- Navy Board
- Board of Admiralty
- Admiralty
