= Victualling Department (Royal Navy) =

U.K. government agency

Agency overview
- Formed: 1832
- Preceding agency: Victualling Board
- Dissolved: 1964
- Superseding agency: Naval Stores Department
- Jurisdiction: Government of the United Kingdom
- Headquarters: Admiralty; London
- Agency executives: Director of Victualling; Deputy Director of Victualling; Assistant Director of Victualling
- Parent department: Admiralty

The Victualling Department, originally known as the Department of the Comptroller of Victualling and Transport Services or the Victualling Office, and also known as the Department of the Director of Victualling, was the British Admiralty department responsible for civil administration of Victualling Yards and the storing and supply of Naval Victuals for the Royal Navy from 1832 to 1964.

== History ==
The provision of Victualling to the Royal Navy was originally done using specialist food and beverage subcontractors, it became the responsibility of the Surveyor-General of Victuals, who was a principal officer of the Navy Board from 1550 to 1679. In 1683, he was post replaced by a Board of Victualling Commissioners that was subordinate yet autonomous to the Navy Board. The Victualling Board took over a number of functions, including medical services, from the Transport Board when it was abolished in 1817. When the Victualling Board itself was also discharged from its duties in the Admiralty reforms of 1832, victualling became the responsibility of the Board of Admiralty under a new Comptroller of Victualling and Transport Services, under the superintendence of the Fourth Naval Lord. In 1862 the provision transport services passed to a newly created Transport Department and in 1869 the office of Comptroller of Victualling and his department was ended. Its former role was then divided between a new Contract and Purchase Department, that would managed by the Parliamentary and Financial Secretary to the Admiralty, their department became responsible for purchasing, following this re-organisation process a Superintendent of Victualling was created in 1870 until 1878 when it was renamed the Director of Victualling his department managed the store-keeping and supply functions of Navy Victuals for the Royal Navy. In 1961 the department was amalgamated within the Naval Stores Department but remained autonomous until 1964. Victualling continued within the new Navy Department, Ministry of Defence that was created following the merger of the Department of Admiralty in April 1964 into an enlarged ministry.

== Administration ==
Post Holders included:

=== Comptrollers of Victualling and Transport Services ===
- Captain Jame Meek, June 1832 - December 1850
- Thomas Tassell Grant, F.R.S. December 1850 - May 1858
- Charles Richards, Paym, May 1858 - 1862

=== Comptroller of Victualling ===
- Charles Richards, Paym, 1862 - April 1870

=== Superintendents of Victualling and Stores ===
- Sir Samuel Sayer Lewes, Kt, April 1870 - August 1878

=== Directors of Victualling ===
- Sir Samuel Sayer Lewes, Kt, August 1878 - February 1886
- Sir Henry Francis Redhead Torke, February 1886 - December 1905
- Sir Oswyn Alexander Ruthven Murray, December 1905 - October 1911
- James Henry Brooks, October 1911 - 1918
- C. R. B. Lane, February 1939 - June 1944
- Oscar Stanley Norman Rickards, June 1944 - November 1948
- R. H. Shipway Esq. January 1958 - June 1968
- A. W. Holden, June 1968 - May 1970

== Structure of Department ==
As of Spring 1962
Victualling Yards operating from 1860 onward during the existence of this department the number of yards were reduced and included.

- Director of Victualling----------Deputy Director of Victualling--------Assistant Director of Victualling
  - Victualling Yards
    - Antigua Yard.
    - Ascension Yard.
    - Bermuda Yard.
    - Bombay Yard.
    - Chatham Yard.
    - Colombo Yard.
    - Deptford Yard.
    - Devonport Yard.
    - Devonport Yard, NZ.
    - Esquimalt, Yard.
    - Gibraltar Yard.
    - Halifax Yard.
    - Haulbowline Yard.
    - Invergordon Yard.
    - Jamaica Yard.
    - Lyness Yard.
    - Madras Yard.
    - Malta Yard.
    - Pembroke Yard.
    - Plymouth Yard.
    - Portland Yard.
    - Portsmouth Yard.
    - Rosyth Yard.
    - Scapa Flow Yard.
    - Sheerness Yard.
    - Simonstown Yard.
    - Singapore Yard.
    - Sydney Yard.
    - Trincomalee Yard.
    - Wei Hai Wei Yard.
    - Woolwich Yard.

Note:Each yard's victualling supplies were managed by either an Agent Victualler, Master Attendant Victualling, Victualling Contractor or Victualling Stores Officer.

- Victualling Stores
  - Harnley Road, Chandler's Ford.
  - Lumb Mill, Delph.
  - Roche Court, Fareham.
  - Botley, Winchester.

== Timeline ==
Included

- Navy Board, Surveyor-General of Victuals, 1550-1679
- Navy Board, Victualling Office, Victualling Board, 1683-1832
- Board of Admiralty, Comptroller of Victualling and Transport Services, 1832-1862
- Board of Admiralty, Comptroller of Victualling, 1862-1869
- Board of Admiralty, Victualling Department, Superintendent of Victualling, 1869-1878
- Board of Admiralty, Victualling Department, Director of Victualling, Stores 1869-1964

== Sources ==
- Archives, The National. "Records of Victualling Departments". discovery.nationalarchives.gov.uk. National Archives, 1660–1975, ADM 312.
- Clowes, W. Laird (William Laird); Markham, Clements R. (Clements Robert) (1897). The Royal Navy : a history from the earliest times to the present, Vol's 1–7, 55–1900. Sampson Low, Marston, London, England.
- Government H.M. "The Navy List" (various 1832 to 1970), H.M. Stationery Office. London. England
- Hamilton, Sir Vesey (1896). "IV". The Constitution, Character and Functions of the Board of Admiralty and the Civil Departments it Directs. George Bell and Sons. ISBN 9781150465000.
- Haas, J. M. (1994). A Management Odyssey: The Royal Dockyards, 1714–1914. University Press of America. ISBN 9780819194619.
- Rodger, N.A.M. (1979). The Admiralty. Offices of State. Lavenham: T. Dalton. ISBN 0900963948.
- Knight, Roger; Wilcox, Martin (2010). Sustaining the fleet, 1793-1815 : war, the British Navy and the contractor state. Woodbridge: Boydell Press. ISBN 9781843835646.
