= Divisional transport officer =

In the Royal Navy, a Divisional Transport Officer (DTO) or a Divisional Naval Transport Officer (DNTO) and later called a Divisional Sea Transport Officer (DSTO) is a shore-based naval officer responsible for the efficient working of the transports and boats of the flotilla, division or squadron under his charge.

== History ==
The Royal Navy established a Naval Transports Service on 22 December 1916 during World War I the Rear-Admiral Commanding, British Aegean Squadron had a divisional transport officer based at Salonika. These officers were part of the Naval Transport Service. In 1921 the Naval Transport Service was renamed the Sea Transport Service.

== See also ==
- Captain (D) afloat
