= Board of Admiralty =

Authority with administrative and operational control of the Royal Navy

- Flag of the Lord High Admiral. When the office was "put into commission", the flag was used by the commissioners executing the office of Lord High Admiral.

Agency overview
- Formed: 1628
- Preceding agency: Office of the Lord High Admiral
- Dissolved: 1964
- Superseding agency: Admiralty Board and Defence Council of the United Kingdom
- Jurisdiction: Government of the United Kingdom
- Headquarters: Admiralty buildings Whitehall; Westminster, London
- Agency executives: First Lord of the Admiralty; First Sea Lord and Chief of Naval Staff
- Parent department: Admiralty

The Board of Admiralty (1628–1964) was established in 1628 when Charles I put the office of Lord High Admiral into commission. As that position was not always occupied, the purpose was to enable management of the day-to-day operational requirements of the Royal Navy; at that point administrative control of the navy was still the responsibility of the Navy Board, established in 1546. This system remained in place until 1832, when the Board of Admiralty became the sole authority charged with both administrative and operational control of the navy when the Navy Board was abolished. The term Admiralty has become synonymous with the command and control of the Royal Navy, partly personified in the Board of Admiralty and in the Admiralty buildings in London from where operations were in large part directed. It existed until 1964 when the office of First Lord of the Admiralty was finally abolished and the functions of the Lords Commissioners were transferred to the new Admiralty Board and the tri-service Defence Council of the United Kingdom.

== History ==
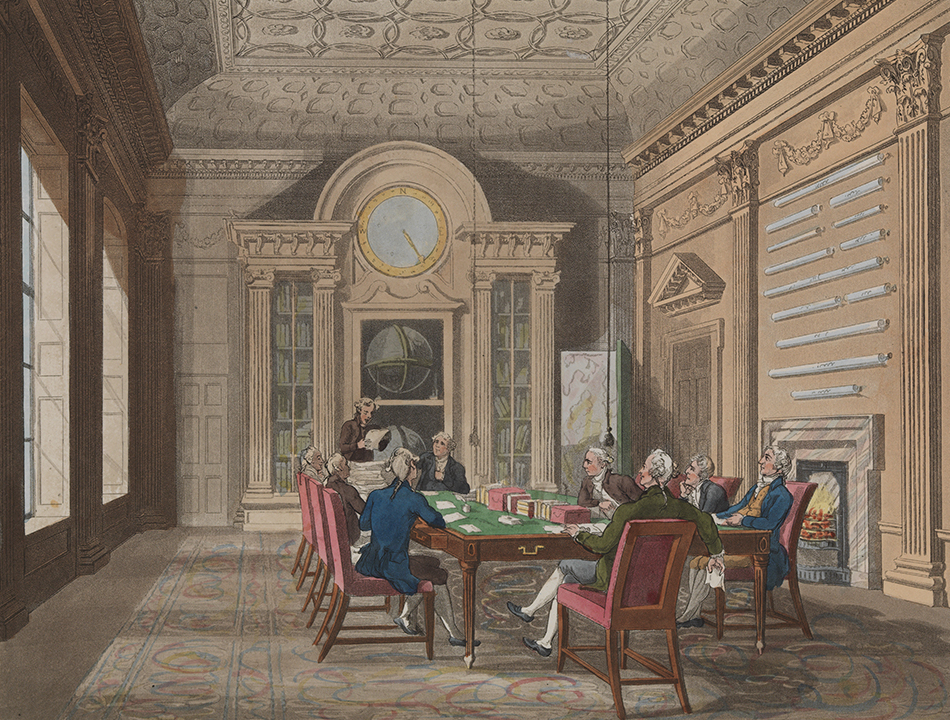
1808 illustration of the Board of Admiralty

The office of Lord High Admiral was created in around 1400 to take charge of the Royal Navy of the Kingdom of England. It was one of the Great Officers of State. The office could be exercised by an individual (as was invariably the case until 1628), by the Crown directly (as was the case between 1684 and 1689), or by a Board of Admiralty. The office of the Lord High Admiral from creation was the titular head of the Royal Navy and its holders were primarily responsible for policy direction, operational control and maritime jurisdiction of the service. On the death of George Villiers, 1st Duke of Buckingham in 1628 his office of Lord High Admiral was put into commission by Charles I, six Lords Commissioners of the Admiralty were appointed to execute the office jointly. In 1638 the office of Lord High Admiral was revived, but throughout the rest of the seventeenth century there were periods when the office was again in commission and even when there was a Lord High Admiral, he was often advised by a separate council, which was virtually a Board of Admiralty under another name.

After the serving Lord High Admiral, James, Duke of York (future James II of England), had been disqualified from the office as a Roman Catholic following the Test Act 1673, the Board of Commissioners consisted of between twelve and sixteen Privy Councillors, who served without salaries. In 1679 this was changed, and the number of Commissioners was reduced to seven, who were to receive salaries and need not be members of the Privy Council.

Finally in 1708, soon after the creation of the Kingdom of Great Britain, the Board of Admiralty became the normal instrument for governing the navy operationally on a day to basis, however the responsibility for the day to day administrative affairs of the naval service lay with another authority known as the Navy Board, established earlier by King Henry VIII in 1546, which had evolved out of the Council of the Marine. There was an exception for the period from 1827 to 1828, when the office of Lord High Admiral was briefly revived for William, Duke of Clarence, later King William IV.

With the exception of the years 1702 to 1709 and 1827 to 1828, when an individual Lord High Admiral was appointed who convened a Lord High Admirals Council to manage naval affairs, this remained the case (although the number of Commissioners varied) until the Admiralty became part of the Ministry of Defence in 1964.

The eighteenth century Board of Admiralty usually contained a preponderance of civilians, although there was a naval element and often a sea officer was First Lord. The Lords Commissioners were all active politicians, even the naval members, and it was usual for some members and later the whole of the Board to change on a change of ministry. After 1806 the First Lord was always a civilian and a senior member of the ministry, while the separate post of First Sea Lord was evolved for the senior professional member. However, until late in the nineteenth century the First Sea Lord and his professional colleagues remained free to play an active part in politics, although as the century progressed they chose to do so less and less. Until the absorption of the High Court of Admiralty into the Court of Judicature they nominally retained, as executors of the office of Lord High Admiral, their centuries-old link with that court.

When the Navy Board was abolished in 1832 and responsibility for the civil administration of the Navy passed to the Board of Admiralty, the Board was redesigned. It now consisted of the First Lord of the Admiralty, four Naval Lords (three between 1868 and 1886), known from 1904 as Sea Lords, and a Civil Lord, with a Parliamentary and a Permanent Secretary.

The Lords Commissioners remained jointly responsible, subject to the controlling political authority of the First Lord, for all aspects of naval affairs, but in addition, especially after the reforms of 1869, they had individual responsibility for the work of the several departments of the Admiralty. This responsibility did not always coincide with control of staff and the head of a department might be responsible to two or more Lords Commissioners for the different aspects of his department's work.

== Organisation ==
ADMIRALTY—shall mean the Lord High Admiral for the time being of the United Kingdom of Great Britain and Ireland, and, when there shall be no such Lord High Admiral in office, any Two or more of the Commissioners for executing the Office of Lord High Admiral of the United Kingdom.

— The Queen's Regulations and Admiralty Instructions for the Regulation of Her Majesty's Naval Service (1879).

The Lords Commissioners usually comprised a mixture of serving admirals, first called Naval Lord Commissioners, then Naval Lords then Professional Naval Lords then Sea Lords, later were added the Naval Staff Lords, and the politicians, Civil Lords, with the civil lords usually in a majority prior to 1830 and finally the Civil Secretaries. Between 1832 and 1869 following the abolition of Navy Board a number of Civilian Naval Officials were also appointed as members.

Board Member	Responsibilities
President of the Board was known as the First Lord of the Admiralty, or sometimes First Lord Commissioner of the Admiralty	He was a member of the Cabinet and political head of the naval service. After 1806, the First Lord of the Admiralty was always a civilian. Prior to this, the post holder was sometimes a Naval officer.
First Sea Lord, later known as First Sea Lord and Chief of the Naval Staff	He directed naval strategy in wartime and was responsible for planning, operations and intelligence, for the distribution of the Fleet, and its fighting efficiency. He served as the military head of the Navy.
Second Sea Lord, later known as the Second Sea Lord and Chief of Naval Personnel	He was responsible for manning, mobilisation, and other personnel-related issues in the Royal Navy and Royal Marines.
Third Sea Lord, later known as the Controller of the Navy	He was mainly responsible for Naval construction, Material Departments, and ship design.
Fourth Sea Lord (or junior) Sea Lord and later Fourth Sea Lord and Chief of Naval Supplies	He was chiefly responsible for the Transport, Victualling and Medical Departments.
Fifth Sea Lord later known as Fifth Sea Lord and Chief of Naval Air Services	He had overall responsibility for all naval aviation affairs.
Secretary to the Admiralty, later known as the Parliamentary and Financial Secretary to the Admiralty	He was responsible for all naval finance generally, such as the preparation of estimates, as well as parliamentary business.
Second Secretary to the Admiralty was later called Permanent Secretary to the Admiralty	He was responsible to the First Lord for preparing all official communications of the Board and for the interior economy of the Admiralty Office; They were also responsible as Accounting Officer for Navy Votes and Accounts, for the control of expenditure and for advising the Board of Admiralty and other naval authorities on all questions of naval expenditure. From 1702 until 1920 he was not a permanent fixed member of the board until 1921. The Permanent Secretary was also head of the Admiralty Secretariat
Civil Lord of the Admiralty	He was responsible for the Royal Navy's supporting civilian staff, its works departments and naval lands officially designated as an office held by one person from 1830 until 1964.
Additional Civil Lord of the Admiralty	He was a member of the board from 1882 to 1885 and 1912 to 1919 and was responsible for promotions and transfers of professional officers and workmen in the dockyards.
Controller	He was responsible for production (military and civil), from 1917 to 1918. This member should be not be confused with the office of Third Sea Lord and Controller of the Navy which existed as different functions throughout the years, with a break between 1912 and 1918. This role was the first civil controller of the navy since the abolition of the Navy Board in 1832.
Controller of Merchant Shipbuilding and Repair	A member briefly from 1917 to 1918 and 1939-1945 he had responsibility for Merchant Shipbuilding and Repairs worked with the Controller however this role later became the responsibility Third Sea Lord.
Accountant-General of the Navy	A member briefly from 1832 to 1869 when the Navy Board was abolished and its then Principal Officers were given places on the Board of Admiralty he had responsibility for Naval Estimates his department would later be merged with that of the Permanent Secretary's in 1932.
Controller of Victualling	A member briefly from 1832 to 1869 when the Navy Board was abolished and its then Principal Officers were given places on the Board of Admiralty he had responsibility for the Victualling Service and Staff.
Director-General of the Medical Department	A member briefly from 1832 to 1869 when the Navy Board was abolished and its then Principal Officers were given places on the Board of Admiralty he had responsibility for Medical Establishments and Staff.
Storekeeper-General of the Navy	A member briefly from 1832 to 1869 when the Navy Board was abolished and its then Principal Officers were given places on the Board of Admiralty he had responsibility for Naval Stores and Staff his office was merged with that of the Third Naval Lord and Controller of the Navy.
Surveyor of the Navy	A member from 1848 to 1859 who had responsibility for ship design his office was renamed Controller of the Navy whose office was amalgamated with that of the Third Naval Lords in 1869.
Deputy Chief of the Naval Staff	Additional Staff Naval Lord and board member from 1917 to 1964. He had responsibility for Admiralty Naval Staff Divisions.
Deputy First Sea Lord	Additional Staff Naval Lord and board member from 1917 to 1919 and again from 1942 to 1946. He had responsibility for Admiralty Naval Staff Divisions.
Vice Chief of the Naval Staff	Additional Staff Naval Lord and board member from 1941 to 1964. He had responsibility for Admiralty Naval Staff Divisions.
Assistant Chief of the Naval Staff (Policy)	Additional Staff Naval Lord and board member from 1917 to 1964. He had responsibility for Admiralty Naval Staff Divisions.

During the First World War the number of Sea Lords was increased at one time to eight and the number of Civil Lords to three, but after the war most of these extra members left the Board. In 1938 the title of the Board member designated Assistant Chief of Naval Staff (Air) was altered to Fifth Sea Lord and Chief of Naval Air Services. For fuller details of Board membership during this period see The Second World War: A Guide to Documents in the Public Record Office (PRO Handbooks No.15) pp13–24.

The specialist departments of the Board of Admiralty changed their names and functions, and varied in number, from time to time, but the system on which the Admiralty was organised continued unchanged until 1 April 1964, when the Board became the Admiralty Board of the Defence Council of the Ministry of Defence, the office of Lord High Admiral itself being vested in Queen Elizabeth II.

== Duties ==
Duties were assigned to each Lord Commissioner by the First Lord and defined in a Minute of the Board, and amended from time to time.

== Appellation ==
The Lords Commissioners were entitled collectively to be known as "The Right Honourable the Lords Commissioners of the Admiralty", and were commonly referred to collectively as "Their Lordships" or "My Lords Commissioners of the Admiralty", though individual members were not entitled to these styles. More informally, they were known in short as "The Lords of the Admiralty". That, for example, is the term invariably used throughout the well-known Horatio Hornblower series of historical novels.

== Abolition ==
With the abolition of the Board of Admiralty and its merger into the Ministry of Defence in 1964, formal control of the Navy was taken over by the Admiralty Board of the Defence Council of the United Kingdom, with the day-to-day running of the Navy taken over by the Navy Board. The office of Lord High Admiral was vested in the Crown (i.e. in the person of the current British monarch) and that of First Lord of the Admiralty ceased to exist, but the First, Second and Third Sea Lords retained their titles, despite ceasing to be Lords Commissioners of the Admiralty.

In 2011, Queen Elizabeth II bestowed the title of Lord High Admiral on her husband Prince Philip, Duke of Edinburgh, which he held until his death in 2021.

== See also ==
- First Secretary of the Admiralty
- List of lords commissioners of the Admiralty
- First Lord of the Admiralty

== Sources ==
- The Statutes of the United Kingdom of Great Britain and Ireland, 3 George IV. 1822. London: By His Majesty's Statute and Law Printer. 1822.
- Hamilton, Admiral Sir. R. Vesey, G.C.B. (1896). Naval Administration: The Constitution, Character, and Functions of the Board of Admiralty, and of the Civil Departments it Directs. London: George Bell and Sons (now in public domain).
- Logan, Karen Dale (1976). The Admiralty: Reforms and Re-organization, 1868–1892. Unpublished PhD dissertation. University of Oxford.
- Miller, Francis H. (1884). The Origin and Constitution of the Admiralty and Navy Boards, to which is added an Account of the various Buildings in which the Business of the Navy has been transacted from time to time. London: For Her Majesty's Stationery Office. Copy in Greene Papers. National Maritime Museum. GEE/19.
- Roskill, S.W., Capt. DSC. RN., The War at Sea, 1939–1945, vol. I, Her Majesty's Stationery Office, London, 1954.
- Records of the Navy Board and the Board of Admiralty/ ADM Division 1/ http://discovery.nationalarchives.gov.uk/details/r/C706. © Crown copyright, which is available under the Open Government Licence v3.0
