= Admiralty in the 17th century =

Admiralty and Marine Affairs Office

Office overview
- Formed: 1414
- Preceding Office: Offices of the Kings Marine
- Dissolved: 1707
- Superseding Office: Admiralty Department
- Jurisdiction: Parliament of England
- Headquarters: Admiralty Building Whitehall London Kingdom of England
- Office executive: Lord High Admiral of England
- Parent Office: Privy Council of England

During the early 17th century, England's relative naval power deteriorated; in the course of the rest of the 17th century, the office of the Admiralty and Marine Affairs steered the Navy's transition from a semi-amateur Navy Royal fighting in conjunction with private vessels into a fully professional institution, a Royal Navy. Its financial provisions were gradually regularised, it came to rely on dedicated warships only, and it developed a professional officer corps with a defined career structure, superseding an earlier mix of sailors and socially prominent former soldiers.

== Historical overview ==
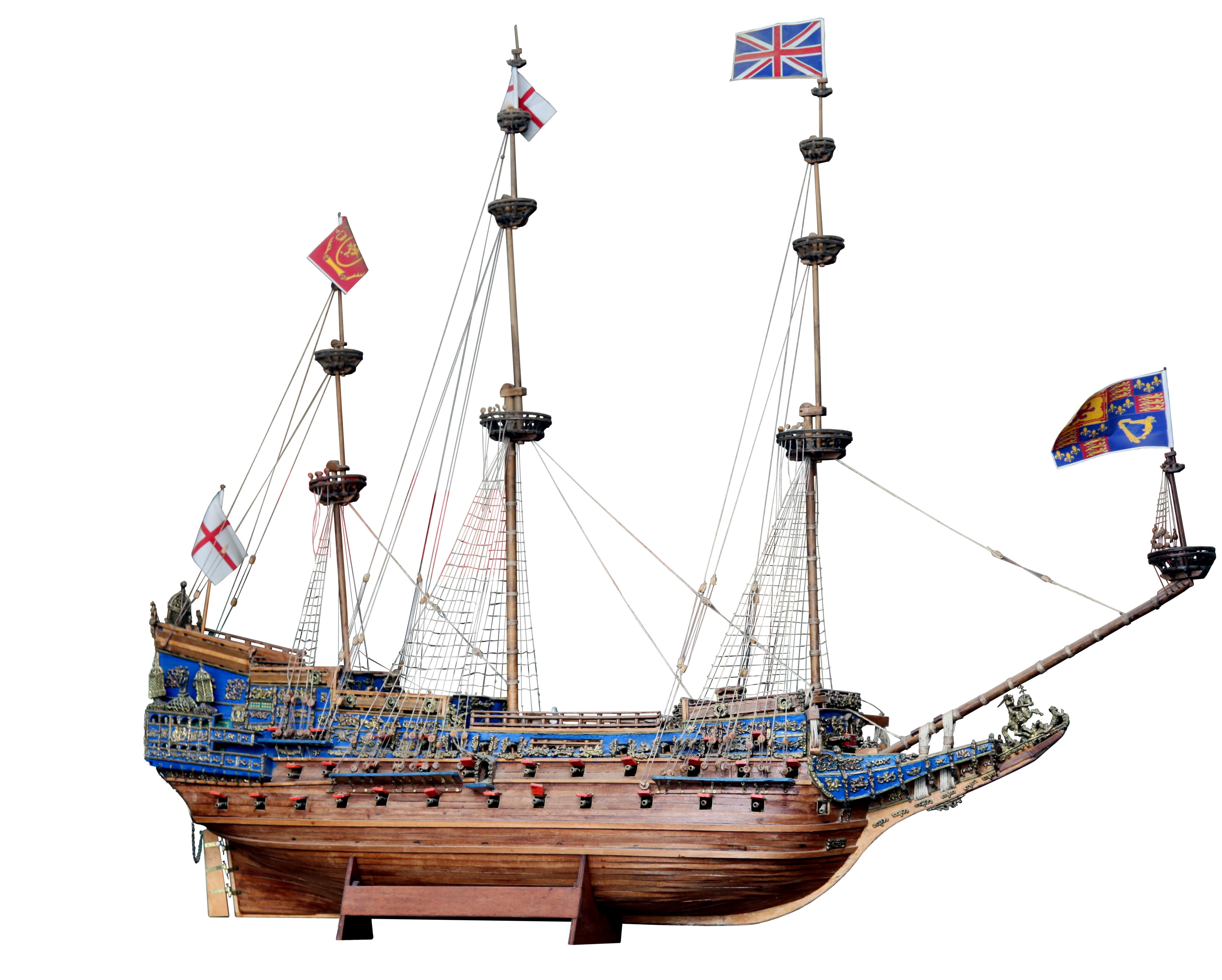
Model of Sovereign of the Seas, launched in 1637

After 1603 the English and Scottish fleets were organized together under James I but the efficiency of the Navy declined gradually, while corruption grew until brought under control in an inquiry of 1618. James concluded a peace with Spain and privateering was outlawed. Between 1618 and 1628, a Navy Commission temporarily replaced the Navy Board, due to misappropriation of public funds by board commissioners. After the inquiry was over the office of the Lord High Admiral (held by the Duke of Buckingham) was restored. However, he was murdered and King Charles I put the office into commission. This led to the creation of a new Board of Admiralty which in its early formation was just the Privy Council in another reincarnation. This in turn also led to the removal of the Admiralty Court from direct control of the Lord High Admiral's. His office was temporarily restored again in 1638, but then put in commission once more after 1679 the Lords Commissioners of Admiralty became the permanent officers responsible for administration of the Navy.

== Organization in the seventeenth century ==
=== Admiralty of England ===
Tudor Ensign 1600-1603

Stuart Navy Squadron Ensign 1603-1620

English Navy White Ensign 1620-1707

==== Commanders-in-chief ====
- Queen Elizabeth I
- King James I & VI
- King Charles I
- Lord Protectors, Oliver Cromwell, Richard Cromwell
- King Charles II
- King James II & VII
- King William III and Queen Mary II
- Queen Anne

==== Naval Lords of England ====
- Office of the Lord High Admiral of England
  - Vice-Admiral of England and Deputy Lord High Admiral
    - Rear-Admiral of England

==== Civil administration of the Navy ====
Notes: the Secretary of State England for the period 1628 to 1679 was responsible for all policy decisions and direction on behalf of the government due to a continued state of war.

===== Board of Admiralty =====
The Board of Admiralty and the Lord's Commissioners executing the office of the Lord High Admiral

- The Board of Admiralty

First Commissioner and First Lord of the Admiralty

- First Lord of the Admiralty, and member of the English government
  - Clerk of the Admiralty
    - Messenger of the Admiralty, appointed, 1687
    - Housekeeper of the Admiralty appointed (1687 – 1799)
    - Doorkeeper of the Admiralty, 1687
    - Gardner of the Admiralty appointed (1687 – 1799)

Civil Commissioner

- Chief Secretary to the Admiralty (1628 – 1652)
- First Secretary to the Admiralty (1652 – 1871)

Naval Commissioner

- Naval Lord from (1682 – 1689)
- Senior Naval Lord from (1689–1771)

Lords Commissioners of the Admiralty

91 commissioners served during the 17th century.

Notes: Between 1693 and 1830 the commission always included either 1 or 2 additional naval lords except from 1757 until 1782 when it was just the Senior Naval Lord. After 1830 the Naval Lords are titled, First, Second, Third, Fourth until 1904 when they are re-styled Sea Lord. A junior naval lord is introduced in 1868 until 1903 then is re-styled Fifth Sea Lord from 1917.

=== Naval operations ===
==== Senior leadership ====
Naval High Command

- Office of the Lord High Admiral of England (1600 – 1628)
  - Office of the Vice-Admiral of England
    - Office of the Rear-Admiral of England
- Office of the First Lord of the Admiralty (1628 – 1964)
  - Office of the Naval Lord of the Admiralty*
    - Admiralty Secretariat, (1690-1932)
    - Greenwich Hospital
    - Nautical Almanac Office
    - Register office
    - Royal Observatory
    - Sixpenny Office

==== Fleet commands ====
Flag officers of the fleet

- Admiral of the Fleet Red
  - Vice-Admiral of the Red
    - Rear-Admiral of the Red
- Admiral of the White
  - Vice-Admiral of the White
    - Rear-Admiral of the White
- Admiral of the Blue
  - Vice-Admiral of the Blue
    - Rear-Admiral of the Blue

==== Flag officers commanding fleets and stations ====
Flag officer commanding individual fleets and stations

===== Home commands =====
- Admiral Commanding, the Narrow Seas, (1412-1688)
- Admiral/Vice-Admiral Commanding, in the Channel. (1512-1746)
- Commander-in-Chief, the Downs, (1628-1834)
- Commander-in-Chief, Medway, (1698-1699)
- Commander-in-Chief, Portsmouth (1667-1969)
- Commander, Royal Squadron, (1660-1995)
- Commander-in-Chief, Thames, (1695-1696)
- Commander-in-Chief, Western Squadron, (1650-1854)

==== Shore commands ====
- Vice-Admiralties of the Coast of England, Scotland, Ireland and Wales, (1536-1830)

===== Overseas commands =====
- Commander-in-Chief, Jamaica Station (1655-1830)
- Commander-in-Chief, Mediterranean Fleet (1690-1967)

==== Fleet units ====
Composition of the Navy between 1649-1690
Type	Number of units
Ships of the Line 1st rate	7
Ships of the Line 2nd rate	11
Ships of the Line 3rd rate	40
Ships of the Line 4th rate	19
Ships of the Line 5th-6th rate	26
Captured ships of the line	10
Sloops	22
Armed merchants	29
Flyboats	28
Galliots & hoys	22
Fireships	111
Bomb vessels	17
Hospital ships	4
Yachts	25
In commission	361

Squadrons

- Red Squadron
- White Squadron
- Blue Squadron

=== Administrative and logistical support ===
==== Board of ordnance ====
===== Principal officers =====
Board of Ordnance (1597 – 1855)

- Office of the Board of Ordnance
  - Master-General of the Ordnance (1597 – 1855)
    - Lieutenant-General of the Ordnance (1597 – 1855)
      - Treasurer of the Ordinance (1597 – 1855)
      - Surveyor-General of the Ordnance (1597 – 1888)
      - Clerk of the Ordnance (1554 – 1853)
      - Storekeeper of the Ordnance (1558 – 1845)
      - Clerk of Deliveries of the Ordnance (1570 – 1812)

===== Ordnance yards and stores =====
Home ordinance yards

- The Gun Wharf, Chatham Dockyard
- Gunwharf Portsmouth Dockyard

Gunpowder magazines stores

- Tower of London, London (1461 – 1855)
- Square Tower, Portsmouth (1584 – 1855)

==== Navy board ====
Construction, design, maintenance, supplies

===== Principal officers =====
- Office of the Navy Board
  - Comptroller of the Navy (1597 – 1832)
    - Surveyor of the Navy (1597 – 1832)
    - Treasurer of the Navy (1597 – 1832)
    - Clerk of the Navy
    - Surveyor-General Victuals, (1550-1679)
    - Controller of Treasurer Accounts, (1667-1796)
    - Controller of Victualling Accounts, (1667-1796)
    - Controller of Storekeepers Accounts, (1671-1796)
    - Commissioners for Old Accounts, (1686-8)
    - Commissioners for Current Business, (1686-8)
    - Commissioners for Examining Accounts (Incurred), (1688-9)

===== Subsidiary boards of navy board =====
- Office of the Navy Board
  - Sick and Hurt Board (established temporarily in times of war from 1653, placed on a permanent footing from 1715)
  - Victualling Board (1683 – 1832)
  - Transport Board (1690 – 1724, re-established 1794)

===== Shore facilities =====
Note: Dockyards during this period were managed by the commissioners of the Navy Board.

Home naval base and dockyards

- Portsmouth Dockyard (1496 – present)
- Woolwich Dockyard (1512 – 1869)
- Deptford Dockyard (1513 – 1869)
- Erith Dockyard (1514 – 1521), failed yard: due to persistent flooding
- Chatham Dockyard (1567 – 1983)
- Sheerness Dockyard (1665 – 1957)
- Plymouth Dockyard, Plymouth (1690 – 1824)

Oversea bases and dockyards

- Jamaica Dockyard, Port Royal, Jamaica (1675 – 1905)

=== Judicial administration ===
Note:Admiralty Courts date to at least the 1360s, during the reign of Edward III. At that time there were three such Courts, appointed by Admirals responsible for waters to the north, south and west of England. In 1483 these local courts were amalgamated into a single High Court of Admiralty, administered by the Lord High Admiral of England. The Deputy Lord High Admiral presided over the High Court.

==== Admiralty courts ====
- Lord High Admiral of England
  - Vice Admiral of England and Deputy Lord High Admiral
    - Advocate General to the office of the Lord High Admiral

Legal advisors to the admiralty courts

- Office of the Lord High Admiral
  - Counsel to the Admiralty,(1673 – 1824), attached originally to the Navy Board
  - Solicitor for the Affairs of the Admiralty and Navy, appointed (1692 – 1799)

==== High court of the admiralty ====
- Office of the High Court of the Admiralty Court (1450 – 1875)
  - Judge of the High Court of Admiralty
  - Judge Advocate of the Fleet
    - Deputy Judge Advocate of the Fleet
  - Proctor of the High Court of Admiralty
  - Marshall of the High Court of Admiralty
  - Droits of the High Court of Admiralty

==== Vice admiralty courts ====
The Vice-Admiral of the Coast was responsible for the defence of one of the twenty maritime counties of England, the North and South of Wales. As a Vice-Admiral, the post holder was the chief of naval administration for his district. His responsibilities included deciding the outcome of the Prize court (captured by pirate ships), dealing with salvage claims for wrecks, and acting as a judge in relation to maritime issues.

- Vice-Admiral Cheshire (1559 – 1835)
- Vice-Admiral Cornwall (1559 – 1917)
- Vice-Admiral Cumberland (1559 – 1835)
- Vice-Admiral Devon (1559 – 1835)
- Vice-Admiral Dorset (1559 – 1835)
- Vice-Admiral Durham (1559 – 1835)
- Vice-Admiral Essex (1559 – 1835)
- Vice-Admiral Gloucestershire (1559 – 1835)
- Vice-Admiral Hampshire (1558 – 1846)
- Vice-Admiral Kent (1558 – 1846)
- Vice-Admiral Lancashire (1569 – 1861)
- Vice-Admiral Lincolnshire (1565 – 1862)
- Vice-Admiral Norfolk (1554 – 1846)
- Vice-Admiral Northumberland (1559 – 1847)
- Vice-Admiral Somerset (1561 – 1865)
- Vice-Admiral Suffolk (1554 – 1947)
- Vice-Admiral Sussex (1559 – 1860)
- Vice-Admiral Westmorland (1559 – 1802)
- Vice-Admiral Yorkshire (1559 – 1860)

Vice Admiralty jurisdictions and prizes abroad

By appointing Vice-Admirals in the colonies, and by constituting courts as Vice-Admiralty Courts, the terminology recognized the existence and superiority of the "mother" court in the United Kingdom. Thus, the "vice" tag denoted that whilst it was a separate court, it was not equal to the "mother" court. In the case of the courts abroad, a right of appeal lay back to the British Admiralty Court, which further reinforced this superiority. In all respects, the court was an Imperial court rather than a local Colonial court.

North America

- Vice-Admiral Carolina
- Vice-Admiral Maryland
- Vice-Admiral Massachusetts
- Vice-Admiral New Hampshire
- Vice-Admiral New York, including Connecticut
- Vice-Admiral Pennsylvania, including Delaware
- Vice-Admiral Virginia

West Indies

- Vice-Admiral Barbados
- Vice-Admiral Jamaica

== See also ==
- Admiralty in the 16th century
- Admiralty in the 18th century

== Sources ==
- The Statutes of the United Kingdom of Great Britain and Ireland, 3 George IV. 1822. London: By His Majesty's Statute and Law Printer. 1822.
- Hamilton, Admiral Sir. R. Vesey, G.C.B. (1896). Naval Administration: The Constitution, Character, and Functions of the Board of Admiralty, and of the Civil Departments it Directs. London: George Bell and Sons.
- Logan, Karen Dale (1976). The Admiralty: Reforms and Re-organization, 1868-1892. Unpublished Ph.D. dissertation. University of Oxford.
- Miller, Francis H. (1884). The Origin and Constitution of the Admiralty and Navy Boards, to which is added an Account of the various Buildings in which the Business of the Navy has been transacted from time to time. London: For Her Majesty's Stationery Office. Copy in Greene Papers. National Maritime Museum. GEE/19.
- Rodger. N.A.M. (1979), The Admiralty (offices of state), T. Dalton, Lavenham, ISBN 978-0900963940.
