= Admiralty in the 18th century =

Admiralty of Great Britain

Agency overview
- Formed: 1410–1964
- Jurisdiction: Kingdom of England, Kingdom of Great Britain
- Headquarters: Whitehall, Westminster, London
- Agency executive: First Lord of the Admiralty President of the Board
- Parent agency: English government; British government

The Glorious Revolution of 1688 rearranged the political map of Europe and led to a series of wars with France that lasted well over a century. This was the classic Age of Sail; while the ships themselves evolved in only minor ways, technique and tactics were honed to a high degree, and the battles of the Napoleonic Wars entailed feats that would have been impossible for the fleets of the 17th century. Because of parliamentary opposition, James II fled the country. The landing of William III and the Glorious Revolution itself was a gigantic effort involving 100 warships and 400 transports carrying 11,000 infantry and 4,000 horses. It was not opposed by the English or Scottish fleets.

== Historical overview ==
Naval operations in the War of the Spanish Succession (1702–13) were with the Dutch against the Spanish and French. They were at first focused on the acquisition of a Mediterranean base, culminating in an alliance with Portugal and the capture of Gibraltar (1704) and Port Mahon in Menorca (1708). In addition Newfoundland and Nova Scotia were obtained. Even so, freedom of action in the Mediterranean did not decide the war, although it gave the new Kingdom of Great Britain (created by the Union of England and Scotland in 1707) an advantage when negotiating the Peace of Utrecht, and made Britain a recognized great power. The British fleet ended Spanish occupation of Sicily in 1718 and in 1727 blockaded Panama.

The subsequent quarter-century of peace saw a few naval actions. The Navy was used against Russia and Sweden in the Baltic from 1715 to 1727 to protect supplies of naval stores. It was used at the Battle of Cape Passaro in 1718, during the Great Northern War, and in the West Indies (1726). There was a war against Spain in 1739 over the slave trade. In 1745 the Navy transported troops and stores to Scotland to defeat the Jacobite rising.

The War of Jenkins' Ear (1739–48) saw various naval operations in the Caribbean under different admirals against Spanish trade and possessions, before the war merged into the wider War of the Austrian Succession (1740–48). This in turn brought a new round of naval operations against France. In 1745 the Navy twice defeated the French off Finisterre, but their convoys escaped. The Navy also defended against invasion by Charles Edward Stuart the "Young Pretender". By the end of the war, the Navy was fully engaged in the worldwide protection of British trade.

The Seven Years' War (1756–63) began somewhat inauspiciously for the Navy, with the French siege of Menorca and the failure to relieve it. Menorca was lost, but subsequent operations were more successful (due more to government support and better strategic thinking, rather than admirals reacting to John Byng's execution), and the British fleet won several victories. The French tried to invade Britain in 1759 but their force was defeated at Quiberon Bay. Spain entered the war against Britain in 1762 but lost Havana and Manila, though the latter was given back in exchange for Florida. The Treaty of Paris that ended the war left Britain with colonial gains, but strategically isolated.

At the beginning of the American Revolutionary War (1775–83), the Royal Navy dealt with the fledgling Continental Navy handily, destroying or capturing many of its vessels. France soon took the American side, and in 1778 a French fleet sailed for America, where it attempted to land at Rhode Island and nearly engaged with the British fleet before a storm intervened. Spain and the Dutch Republic entered the war in 1780. Action shifted to the Caribbean, where there were a number of battles with varying results. The most important operation came in 1781, when in the Battle of the Chesapeake, the British failed to lift the French blockade of Lord Cornwallis, resulting in a British surrender in the Battle of Yorktown. Although combat was over in North America, it continued in the Caribbean and India, where the British experienced both successes and failures. Though Menorca had been recaptured, it was returned to the Spanish.

== Organization ==
=== Admiralty of Great Britain ===
English Navy White Ensign, 1700–1707

British Navy White Ensign, 1707–1801

White Squadron Ensign, 1702–1707

==== Commanders in chief ====
- Queen Anne
- King George I
- King George II
- King George III

==== Naval Lords of England and Great Britain ====
- Office of the Lord High Admiral of England
  - Office of the Vice-Admiral of England
    - Office of the Rear-Admiral of England
- Office of the Lord High Admiral of Great Britain
  - Office of the Vice-Admiral of Great Britain
    - Office of the Rear-Admiral of Great Britain

==== Civil administration of the Navy ====
===== Board of Admiralty =====
The Board of Admiralty and the Lord's Commissioners executing the office of the Lord High Admiral:

- Board of Admiralty
  - Private Office of the First Lord of the Admiralty, and member of the English government to 1706, member of the British government (1707–1801)
    - Office of Private Secretary to the First Lord of the Admiralty
    - Office of the Clerk of the Admiralty
    - Office of the Admiralty Clerk of the Journals, appointed (1638–1741)
      - Messenger of the Admiralty, appointed (1687)
      - Housekeeper of the Admiralty, appointed (1687–1799)
      - Doorkeeper of the Admiralty (1687)
      - Gardner of the Admiralty, appointed (1687–1799)
      - Office of the Translator to the Admiralty (1755 – 1869).

Civil Commissioner

- First Secretary to the Admiralty (1652–1959)
  - Office of the Chief Clerk of the Admiralty, appointed (1694–1870)
- Deputy Secretary to the Admiralty (1728–41; 1744–46; 1756–59; 1764–83)
- Joint Secretary to the Admiralty (1741–1742)
- Office of the Second Secretary to the Admiralty (1702–1766; 1759–1763).

Naval Lords

- Naval Lords Commissioners (1700–1762)
- Senior Naval Lord (1689–1860)

Lords Commissioners of the Admiralty
A total of 609 commissioners served during the 18th century. Between 1693 and 1830, the commission always included one or two additional naval lords, except from 1757 until 1782 when it was just the Senior Naval Lord. After 1830 the naval lords were titled First, Second, Third, and Fourth until 1904, when they were re-styled Sea Lord. A Junior Naval Lord was introduced from 1868 until 1903, then re-styled Fifth Sea Lord from 1917.

=== Judicial administration ===
The Admiralty Courts date to at least the 1360s, during the reign of Edward III. At that time there were three such courts, appointed by admirals responsible for waters to the north, south and west of England. In 1483 these local courts were amalgamated into a single High Court of Admiralty, administered by the Lord High Admiral of England.

- Office of the Lord High Admiral
  - Advocate General to the Office of the Lord High Admiral

Legal advisors to the admiralty courts, also under the Office of the Lord High Admiral:

- Office of the Counsel to the Admiralty, appointed (1673–1824; originally attached to the Navy Board)
- Office of Solicitor for the Affairs of the Admiralty and Navy, appointed (1692–1799).

==== High Court of Admiralty ====
- Office of the High Court of Admiralty (1450–1875)
  - Office of the President and Judge of the High Court, in England and Wales only
  - Office of the Judge Advocate of the Fleet
    - Office of the Deputy Judge Advocate of the Fleet
  - Office of the Proctor of the High Court
  - Office of the Marshall of the High Court
  - Office of the Droits of the High Court
    - Vice Admiralty of the Courts (Home)
    - Vice Admiralty of Jurisdictions and Prizes (Abroad)

==== Vice admiralty courts ====
The Vice-Admiral of the Coast was responsible for the defence of one of the twenty maritime counties of England, the north and south of Wales, Scotland and Ireland As a vice-admiral, the post holder was the chief of naval administration for his district. His responsibilities included deciding the outcome of the prize court (legality of ship captures), dealing with salvage claims for wrecks, and acting as a judge in relation to maritime issues.

===== England =====
- Vice-Admiral Cheshire
- Vice-Admiral Cornwall
- Vice-Admiral Cumberland
- Vice-Admiral Devon
- Vice-Admiral Dorset
- Vice-Admiral Durham
- Vice-Admiral Essex
- Vice-Admiral Gloucestershire
- Vice-Admiral Hampshire
- Vice-Admiral Kent
- Vice-Admiral Lancashire
- Vice-Admiral Lincolnshire
- Vice-Admiral Norfolk
- Vice-Admiral Northumberland
- Vice-Admiral Somerset
- Vice-Admiral Suffolk
- Vice-Admiral Sussex
- Vice-Admiral Westmorland
- Vice-Admiral Yorkshire

===== Ireland =====
- Vice-Admiral Ireland
- Vice-Admiral Connaught
- Vice-Admiral Leinster
- Vice-Admiral Munster
- Vice-Admiral Ulster

===== Scotland =====
- Vice-Admiral Scotland
- Vice-Admiral Orkney and Shetland
- Vice-Admiral Western Coast

===== Wales =====
- Vice-Admiral North Wales
- Vice-Admiral South Wales

===== Vice Admiralty Jurisdictions and prizes abroad =====
By appointing Vice-Admirals in the colonies, and by constituting courts as Vice-Admiralty Courts, the terminology recognized that the existence and superiority of the "mother" court in the United Kingdom. Thus, the "vice" tag denoted that whilst it was a separate court, it was not equal to the "mother" court. In the case of the courts abroad, a right of appeal lay back to the British Admiralty Court, which further reinforced this superiority. In all respects, the court was an Imperial court rather than a local Colonial court.

====== North America ======
- Vice-Admiral Carolina (1694–1712)
- Vice-Admiral Georgia (1754–1777)
- Vice-Admiral Maryland (1697–1776)
- Vice-Admiral Massachusetts (1698–1776)
- Vice-Admiral New Hampshire (1699–1776)
- Vice-Admiral New York, including, Connecticut and New Jersey (1694–1776)
- Vice-Admiral North Carolina (1729–1776)
- Vice-Admiral Pennsylvania, including Delaware, (1697–1776)
- Vice-Admiral Rhode Island (1704–1776)
- Vice-Admiral South Carolina (1712–1776)
- Vice-Admiral Virginia (1697–1776)

====== West Indies ======
- Vice-Admiral Barbados
- Vice-Admiral Jamaica

=== Naval operations ===
==== Senior leadership ====
The Naval High Command included:

- Office of the Lord High Admiral (1600–1628)
  - Office of the Vice-Admiral of England (1600–1707)
  - Office of the Vice-Admiral of Great Britain (1707–1801)
    - Office of the Rear-Admiral of England (1600–1707)
    - Office of the Rear-Admiral of Great Britain (1707–1801)
- Office of the First Lord of the Admiralty (1628–1964)
  - Office of the Naval Lord of the Admiralty
    - Admiralty Secretariat
    - Board of Longitude
    - Greenwich Hospital
    - Nautical Almanac Office
    - Office of the Chaplain General
    - Office of the Charity for Sea Officers' Widows
    - Office of the Compassionate Fund
    - Office of the Hydrographer of the Navy
    - Office of the Poor Knights of Windsor
    - Register Office
    - Royal Naval Academy
    - Royal Observatory
    - Sixpenny Office

==== Fleet commands ====
Flag officers of the fleet

- Admiral of the Fleet Red
  - Vice-Admiral of the Red.
    - Rear-Admiral of the Red.
- Admiral of the White.
  - Vice-Admiral of the White.
    - Rear-Admiral of the White
- Admiral of the Blue.
  - Vice-Admiral of the Blue.
    - Rear-Admiral of the Blue

==== Flag officers commanding fleets and stations ====
Fleets

- Commander-in-Chief, Channel Fleet (1690 – 1909).
- Commander-in-Chief, Mediterranean Fleet (1690 – 1967).

Home Commands

- Commander-in-Chief, Coast of Ireland Station (1797 – 1922).
- Commander-in-Chief, The Downs (1777 – 1815)
- Commander-in-Chief, The Nore (1742 – 1961)
  - Admiral-Superintendent, Chatham (1752 – 1955)
    - Captain Superintendent, Sheerness (1799 – 1898).
- Commander-in-Chief, North Sea (1782 – 1815)
- Commander-in-Chief, Portsmouth (1697 – 1969).
  - Admiral-superintendent, Portsmouth (1707 – 1712), (1832 – 1969)
- Commander-in-Chief, Plymouth (1743 – 1969).
  - Admiral-Superintendent, Plymouth (1707 – 1712), (1832 – 1966)

Overseas Commands

- Commander-in-Chief, Jamaica Station (1655 – 1830).
- Commander-in-Chief, Newfoundland Station (1729 – 1825).
- Commander-in-Chief, East Indies Station (1744 – 1941).
- Commander-in-Chief, North America Station (1745 – 1818).
- Commander-in-Chief, Leeward Islands Station (1775 – 1853).
- Commander-in-Chief, Cape of Good Hope Station (1795 – 1939).

==== Fleet units ====
Composition of the Navy by 1760
Type	Number of units
Ships of the Line 1st rate	7
Ships of the Line 2nd rate	13
Ships of the Line 3rd rate	71
Ships of the Line 4th rate	73
Ships of the Line 5th rate	54
Ships of the Line 6th rate	61
Captured ships of the line	15
Frigates	82
Sloops	21
Armed Merchants	39
Fireships	27
Bomb Vessels	15
Hospital Ships	4
Yachts	5
In commission	487

Composition of the Navy by 1799
Type	Number of units
Ships of the Line	230
Captured ships of the line	25
Frigates	234
Sloops	331
Brigs	54
Fireships	34
Bomb Vessels	31
Hospital Ships	2
Yachts	5
In commission	946

Squadrons

- Red Squadron
- White Squadron
- Blue Squadron

=== Administrative and logistical support ===
==== Board of Ordnance ====
- Office of the Board of Ordnance. (1597–1855)
  - Office of the Master-General of the Ordnance (1597–1855)
    - Office of the Lieutenant-General of the Ordnance (1597–1855)
      - Office of the Treasurer of the Ordinance (1597–1855)
      - Office of the Surveyor-General of the Ordnance (1597–1888)
      - Office of the Clerk of the Ordnance (1554–1853)
      - Office of the Storekeeper of the Ordnance (1558–1845)
      - Office of the Clerk of Deliveries of the Ordnance (1570–1812)
        - Officers and Officials of Ordnance yards and stores

===== Ordnance yards and stores =====
Home Ordnance Yards

- The Gun Wharf, Chatham Dockyard,
- Gunwharf Portsmouth Dockyard,

Gunpowder Magazines Stores

- Tower of London, London, (1461–1855)
- Square Tower, Portsmouth, (1584–1855)

==== Navy board ====
Construction, design, maintenance, material, supplies

- Office of the Navy Board also known as the Navy Office
  - Office of the Comptroller of the Navy (1597–1832)
    - Office of the Surveyor of the Navy (1597–1832)
      - Office of the Inspector of Naval Repairs (1731–1796).
      - Naval Works Department (1796 – 1813)
        - Office of the Inspector General of Naval Works (1796 – 1808)
          - Office of the Architect of Naval Works (1796 – 1808)
          - Office of the Mechanist of Naval Works (1796 – 1808)
          - Office of the Mechanist of Naval Works (1796 – 1808)
          - Office of the Chemist of Naval Works (1796 – 1808)
          - Office of the Secretary of Naval Works (1731–1799).
          - Offices the Master Shipwrights of Naval Dockyards
    - Office of the Treasurer of the Navy (1546–1597).
      - Navy Pay Office
        - Office of the Paymaster of the Navy
          - Allotment Office
          - Bills and Accounts Office
          - Navy Branch
          - Office for Examining Treasurer's Accounts
          - Prize Branch
          - Remittance Office
          - Ticket Office
          - Office for Seaman's Wages
          - Office for Stores
    - Office of the Clerk of the Acts (1413–1796)
    - Office of the Controller of Treasurer Accounts (1667–1796)
    - Office of the Controller of Victualling Accounts (1667–1796)
      - Contract Office
    - Office of the Controller of Storekeepers Accounts (1671–1796)
      - Storekeepers HM Yards

===== Subsidiary boards =====
- Office of the Navy Board
  - Office of the Comptroller of the Navy (1597–1831)
    - Sick and Hurt Board, (established temporarily in times of war from 1653, placed on a permanent footing from 1715).
      - Royal Naval Hospitals.
    - Transport Board (1690–1724, re-established 1794–1862).
      - Penal Transportation
    - Victualling Board (1683–1832).
      - Office of the Chairman of the Board
        - Office of the Commissioners of the Board
          - Office of the Secretary for Cash and Stores Accounts.
            - Cash Department
            - Stores Department
      - Victualling Yard, Antigua
        - Office of the Commissioner Antigua
      - Victualling Yard Deptford.
        - Office of the Commissioner Deptford
      - Victualling Yard, Gibraltar
        - Office of the Commissioner Gibraltar
      - Victualling Yard, Harwich
        - Office of the Commissioner Harwich
      - Victualling Yard, Jamaica
        - Office of the Commissioner Jamaica
      - Victualling Yard, Portsmouth
        - Office of the Commissioner Portsmouth
      - Victualling Yard, Plymouth
        - Office of the Commissioner Plymouth

===== Shore facilities =====
Note: Dockyards during this period were managed by the individual Commissioners of the Navy for each yard.

Home naval base and dockyards:

- Portsmouth Dockyard (1496–present)
- Woolwich Dockyard (1512–1869)
- Deptford Dockyard (1513–1869)
- Erith Dockyard (1514–1521), failed yard due to persistent flooding.
- Chatham Dockyard (1567–1983)
- Sheerness Dockyard (1665–1957)
- Plymouth Dockyard, Plymouth (1690–1824).

Overseas naval bases and dockyards:

- Jamaica Dockyard, Port Royal (1675–1905)
- Gibraltar Dockyard (1704–1982)
- Port Mahon Dockyard, Menorca (1708–1802)
- Nelson's Dockyard, Antigua (1723–1889)
- Royal Naval Dockyard, Halifax, Nova Scotia, Canada (1759–1905)
- Navy Island Dockyard, Ontario, Canada (1763–1822)
- Kingston Dockyard, Ontario, Canada (1783–1853)
- York Shipyards, Upper Canada (1793–1813)
- Royal Naval Dockyard, Bermuda (1795–1951)
- Amherstburg Royal Naval Dockyard, Ontario, Canada (1796–1813).

=== Marines ===
==== Marine department ====
- Office of the Admirals Regiment (1655–1755)
- Office of the Marine Department (1755–1809)
  - Marine Pay Office
    - Office of the Paymaster of the Marines (1784–1831).

==== Marine forces ====
- Office of the Corps of the Royal Marines (1755)
  - Colonel Commandant Chatham Division
  - Colonel Commandant Portsmouth Division
  - Colonel Commandant Plymouth Division.

=== Impress service ===
Responsible for forced naval recruitment, the Admiralty handled command and control of the impress service, whilst the Navy Board administered the service.

- Office of the Impress Service
  - Office of the Admiral Commanding Impress Service
    - Offices of the Captains Regulating the Impress Service Ports.

=== Sea fencible militias ===
The Sea Fencibles were a British naval militia, mostly volunteers, that was formed in 1793 to act as an anti-invasion force in coastal waters.

- Office of the Director of Sea Fencibles
  - Offices of the Fencible Districts

Sea Fencible Districts, 1798 to 1801:

1. Emsworth to Beachy Head
2. Beachy Head to Deal
3. Deal to Faversham
4. Leigh to Harwich
5. Harwich to Yarmouth
6. Isle of Wight
7. Coast of Hampshire
8. Coast of Dorset
9. Coast of Devon
10. Plymouth to Land's End
11. Saltfleet to Flamborough Head

== Sources ==
- The Statutes of the United Kingdom of Great Britain and Ireland, 3 George IV. 1822. London: By His Majesty's Statute and Law Printer. 1822.
- Hamilton, Richard Vesey (1896). Naval Administration: The Constitution, Character, and Functions of the Board of Admiralty, and of the Civil Departments it Directs. London: George Bell and Sons.
- Logan, Karen Dale (1976). The Admiralty: Reforms and Re-organization, 1868–1892. Unpublished Ph.D. dissertation. University of Oxford.
- Miller, Francis H. (1884). The Origin and Constitution of the Admiralty and Navy Boards, to which is added an Account of the various Buildings in which the Business of the Navy has been transacted from time to time. London: For Her Majesty's Stationery Office. Copy in Greene Papers. National Maritime Museum. GEE/19.
- Rodger, Nicholas A. M. (1979). The Admiralty (Offices of State). T. Dalton, Lavenham, ISBN 978-0900963940.
