= Admiralty in the 16th century =

English government ministry responsible for the Royal Navy until 1707

Admiralty and Marine Affairs Office

Government agency overview
- Formed: 1414
- Preceding Government agency: Offices of the Kings Marine
- Dissolved: 1707
- Jurisdiction: Parliament of England
- Headquarters: Admiralty Building, Whitehall, London
- Government agency executive: Lord High Admiral
- Parent Government agency: Privy Council of England

The Admiralty and Marine Affairs Office (1546–1707), previously known as the Admiralty Office (1414–1546), was a government department of the Kingdom of England, responsible for the Royal Navy. First established in 1414 when the offices of the separate Admiral of the North and West were abolished and their functions unified under a single centralised command, it was headed by the Lord High Admiral of England. The department existed until 1707 when England and Scotland united to form the Kingdom of Great Britain, after which it was known as the British Admiralty.

Under Henry VIII, the Admiralty supervised the creation of a "Navy Royal", with its own secretariat, dockyards and a permanent core of purpose-built warships. It later helped repulse the 1588 Spanish Armada during the 1585 to 1604 war with Spain, although attacks on the Spanish mainland were far less successful. By the end of the 16th century, corruption within the Admiralty had seriously weakened the Royal Navy, leading to a government enquiry and calls for naval reform.

== Historical overview ==
Tudor Ensign 1485–1603

Although a small permanent navy was first established during the ninth century, it quickly disappeared and pre-16th century monarchs largely relied upon requisitioned merchant ships for their needs. Maritime affairs were managed directly by the Crown until the appointment of a Lord High Admiral in 1385, with administration and operations divided into three regions, the North Sea, English Channel and Irish Sea, each commanded by an admiral. These regional commands were abolished in 1414 and their functions and jurisdiction centralised under a single Admiralty Office, although they did not disappear entirely; the Admiral of the Narrow Seas, first established in 1412, continued to exist as a separate command subordinate to the Lord High Admiral.

As the Royal Navy expanded under Henry VIII of England, increasing costs and complexity required the appointment of specialist departments, including Clerk of the Acts, Comptroller of the Navy (Navy Board), Treasurer of the Navy and Surveyor of the Navy. In 1546, these offices and functions were brought together in the Council of the Marine, a group directed by the Lieutenant of the Admiralty until 1557. Later known as the Navy Board, this was the first permanent attempt to establish an effective naval administration, with responsibility for ship building, maintenance and administration of the Royal Navy Dockyard, although operational matters remained under the Lord High Admiral.

A fifth officer, the Surveyor of Marine Victuals, was added in 1550 with responsibility for food and drink, along with a Board of Ordnance under a Master of the Ordnance, an independent body which supervised the storage and issuing of weapons and gunpowder at the main naval Bases. For the next six decades, this system of administration did not change, except in 1557 the Treasurer of the Navy took over supervision of the Navy Board, which remained independent until 1628 when it became a subsidiary body of the Board of Admiralty. The Treasurer also reported independently to the Lord High Treasurer in order to provide funds for the navy, although spending and administration remained the responsibility of the Navy Board.

== Organisational structure ==
During the 16th century, the Admiralty consisted of the Lord Admiral of England, supported by the Vice-Admiral of England and the Lieutenant of the Admiralty, responsible for the control and direction of naval operations, civil affairs, logistical support and judicial administration of the admiralty courts.

=== Lord Admirals of England ===
First established in 1385 as "High Admiral of England, Ireland and Aquitaine", the position was re-styled "Lord Admiral of England" in 1512, then "Lord High Admiral" from 1638 onward. As titular head of the Royal Navy and one of the Great Officers of State, the role was generally filled by a member of the senior nobility or Royal family, such as Henry's illegitimate son Henry FitzRoy, 1st Duke of Richmond and Somerset. His official duties included civil and judicial administration of the admiralty courts as head of the High Court of Admiralty, as well as naval operations, although many of the latter responsibilities were absorbed by the Council of the Marine in 1545 leaving the Lord Admiral to concentrate on judicial affairs.

==== High Admiral of England, Ireland and Aquitaine, 1500–1512 ====
| Name | Term | Ref |
|---|---|---|
High Admiral of England, Ireland and Aquitaine
| John de Vere, 13th Earl of Oxford | 1485 – 17 March 1513 | |

==== Lord Admirals of England, 1512–1600 ====
| Name | Term | Ref |
|---|---|---|
Lord Admiral of England
| Sir Edward Howard | 17 March 1513 – 4 May 1513 | |
| Thomas Howard, 2nd Earl of Surrey | 4 May 1513 – 16 July 1525 | |
| Henry FitzRoy, 1st Duke of Richmond and Somerset | 16 July 1525 – 16 August 1536 | |
| William Fitzwilliam, 1st Earl of Southampton | 16 August 1536 – 28 July 1540 | |
| John Russell, 1st Earl of Bedford | 28 July 1540 – December 1542 | |
| Edward Seymour, 1st Earl of Hertford | December 1542 – 26 January 1543 | |
| John Dudley, 1st Duke of Northumberland | 26 January 1543 – 17 February 1547 | |
| Thomas Seymour, 1st Baron Seymour of Sudeley | 17 February 1547 – 28 October 1549 | |
| John Dudley, 1st Duke of Northumberland | 28 October 1549 – 14 May 1550 | |
| Edward Clinton - 9th Lord Clinton | 14 May 1550 – 20 March 1554 | |
| William Howard - 1st Lord Howard of Effingham | 20 March 1554 – 10 February 1558 | |
| Edward Clinton - 1st Earl of Lincoln | 10 February 1558 – 8 July 1585 | |
| Charles Howard - 1st Earl of Nottingham- | 8 July 1558 – 28 January 1610 | |

=== Vice-Admiral of England ===
| Name | Term | Ref |
|---|---|---|
Vice-Admiral of England
| William FitzWilliam, 1st Earl of Southampton | 25 April 1513 – 1536 | Post unfilled 1536–1546 |
| Sir Thomas Clere Kt. | April 1546 – December 1552 | |
| Sir William Woodhouse | December 1552 – 1557 | |
| Sir John Clere of Ormesby Kt. | 1557–1558 | Post unfilled 1558–1604 |

=== Lieutenant of the Admiralty ===
| Name | Term | Ref |
|---|---|---|
Lieutenant of the Admiralty
| Sir Thomas Clere | 1545–1552 | |
| Sir William Woodhouse | 1552–1564 | |

=== Subordinate organisations ===
Prior to formation of the Council of the Marine in 1545, the Vice-Admiral of England was supported by four "Clerks of the Kings Marine", variously responsible for naval finance, ship building, safekeeping of ships and ship yards, storehouses and victualling.

| # | Office | Dates | Notes/Ref |
|---|---|---|---|
| 1 | Clerk of the Kings Ships | (1320–1545) | |
| 2 | Clerk Comptroller | (1512–1545) | |
| 3 | Keeper of the Kings Storehouses | (1524–1545) | |
| 4 | Treasurer of Marine Causes | (1528–1545) | |

| # | Organization | Dates | Notes/Ref |
|---|---|---|---|
| 1 | High Court of the Admiralty | (1360–1875) | |
| 2 | Office of Ordnance | (1410–1683) | |

These officers were later joined by another three officers to form the Kings Council of the Marine.

| # | Organization | Dates | Notes/Ref |
|---|---|---|---|
| 1 | Council of the Marine | (1545–1578) | council members styled Chief Officers of the Admiralty |
| 2 | Navy Board | (1578–1832) | |

== Naval operations ==
By 1560 there were three main operational areas; the English Channel, Irish Sea and North Sea, each with its own squadron commanded by an admiral or vice admiral. The number of ships varied depending on circumstances while some were purely temporary formations but during this period they included the following;

Narrow Seas Squadron; also called the "Eastern" and commanded by the Admiral of the Narrow Seas, responsible for protecting English shipping in the Channel, particularly the Straits of Dover, and the area of the southern North Sea between England and the Spanish Netherlands, later the Dutch Republic.

Irish Squadron; a temporary formation in service from 1539 to 1545 and 1569 to 1583, based in Milford Haven under the Admiral of the Irish Squadron.

North Sea Squadron; based first in Great Yarmouth, then Newcastle upon Tyne under the Admiral of the North, responsible for the northern North Sea; established in 1543, it was disbanded in 1563. Included

Channel Squadron; responsible for guarding the western approaches to the Channel and renamed the "Western Squadron" in 1650, this was formed in 1512 and based in Plymouth under the Vice-Admiral in the Channel.

== Shore commands ==
=== Vice-Admiralties of the coast of England, Scotland, Ireland and Wales (1536–1947) ===
The Vice-Admiralties of the Coast were shore commands established in maritime counties of England, Scotland, Ireland and Wales in 1536. The office holders, designated as "Vice-Admirals of the Coast", were responsible for the naval administration, defence, judicial administration and recruitment of naval personnel in each of their respective counties and were deputies of the Lord High Admiral. In 1660 they came under direct control of the Board of Admiralty by the 19th century the posts were gradually phased out.

==== England ====
| # | Post | Dates | Notes/Ref |
|---|---|---|---|
| 1 | Vice-Admiral Cheshire | 1569–1856 | |
| 2 | Vice-Admiral Cornwall | 1559–1601 | (including the Scilly Isles) |
| 3 | Vice-Admiral Cumberland | 1559–1844 | |
| 4 | Vice-Admiral Devon | 1559–1835 | |
| 5 | Vice-Admiral Dorset | 1559–1835 | |
| 6 | Vice-Admiral Durham | 1559–1835 | |
| 7 | Vice-Admiral Essex | 1559–1835 | |
| 8 | Vice-Admiral Gloucestershire | 1559–1835 | |
| 9 | Vice-Admiral Hampshire | 1558–1846 | (including the Isle of Wight) |
| 10 | Vice-Admiral Kent | 1558–1846 | |
| 11 | Vice-Admiral Lancashire | 1569–1851 | |
| 12 | Vice-Admiral Lincolnshire | 1565–1862 | |
| 13 | Vice-Admiral Norfolk | 1536–1846 | |
| 14 | Vice-Admiral Northumberland | 1559–1847 | |
| 15 | Vice-Admiral Somerset | 1561–1855 | |
| 16 | Vice-Admiral Suffolk | 1536–1947 | honorary post in 20th C |
| 17 | Vice-Admiral Sussex | 1559–1860 | |
| 18 | Vice-Admiral Westmorland | 1559–1802 | |
| 19 | Vice-Admiral Yorkshire | 1559–1860 | |

==== Ireland ====
| # | Post | Dates | Notes/Ref |
|---|---|---|---|
| 1 | Vice-Admiral Connaught | 1558–1639 | part of Vice-Admiralty of Ireland to 1558–85 |
| 2 | Vice-Admiral Ireland | 1558–1585 | |
| 3 | Vice-Admiral Leinster | 1585–1647 | ditto |
| 4 | Vice-Admiral Munster | 1559–1648 | ditto |
| 5 | Vice-Admiral Ulster | 1585–1647 | ditto |

==== Wales ====
North Wales (including five coastal counties Anglesey, Carnarvon, Denbigh, Flint & Merioneth under Vice-Admiral, North Wales)

South Wales before 1585 three of the four coastal counties of South Wales, Cardigan, Carmarthen and Pembroke, under Vice Admiral, South Wales only vice admiral for Glamorgan was separate. Thereafter all four counties were placed under a single vice admiral.

| # | Post | Dates | Notes/Ref |
|---|---|---|---|
| 1 | Vice-Admiral North Wales | 1565–1560 | |
| 2 | Vice-Admiral Glamorgan | 1559–1576 | |

== Administrative and logistical support, (1500–1599) ==
Before the formation of the Council of the Marine in 1545, court officials of various monarchs of England responsible for administering the king's ships were called 'Clerks of the Kings Marine'. In 1545 a memorandum was issued by Henry VIII outlining a new organization to be called the 'Council of the Marine, formalized by Letters Patent in April 1546, and consisting of the Chief Officers of the Admiralty as they were then called. In 1578 The council of Marine is renamed the Navy Office and administered by the Navy Board. The chief officers become later known as principal officers and commissioners.

=== Offices of the clerks of the kings marine, (1320–1545) ===
| # | Office | Dates | Notes/Ref |
|---|---|---|---|
| 1 | Clerk of the Kings Ships | (1320–1545) | For over 200 years he was the sole administrator of the English Navy |
| 2 | Clerk Comptroller | (1512–1545) | Specialist office holder appointed to relieve the clerk of the ships of some of his duties |
| 3 | Keeper of the Kings Storehouses | (1524–1545) | ditto |
| 4 | Office of the Treasurer of Marine Causes | (1528–1545) | ditto |

=== Council of the marine, (1545–1578) ===
- Council of the Marine; established under Henry VIII to provide a clear administrative structure to the Royal Navy, it later became known as the Navy Office or Navy Board.

==== Chief Officers of the Admiralty ====
| # | Chief Officer | Dates | Notes/Ref |
|---|---|---|---|
| 1 | Lieutenant of the Admiralty | (1546–1564) | Head of the council of the marine |
| 2 | Treasurer of Marine Causes | (1546–1832) | Head of naval finance in 1564 became head of the council |
| 3 | Clerk Comptroller of the Navy | (1546–1832) | Head of naval spending became head of the navy board in 1660 |
| 4 | Clerk of the Kings Ships | 1320–1796 | Head of Administration of ships of the Crown |
| 5 | Keeper of the Kings Storehouses | (1546–1560) | Head of Naval Stores for the navy |
| 6 | Master of Naval Ordnance | (1546–1589) | special officer assigned to the Admiralty from the Office of Ordnance |
| 7 | Surveyor of Marine Victuals | (1561–1569) | Head of victualling for the navy |
| 8 | Surveyor and Rigger of the Navy | (1546–1859) | Head ship building and design and the dockyards renamed Surveyor of the Navy in 1611 |

=== Navy office, (1578–1832) ===
- Navy Office, (1578–1832) administered by the Navy Board

==== Chief officers and commissioners of the navy board ====
Included:

| # | Chief Officer | Dates | Notes/Ref |
|---|---|---|---|
| 1 | Treasurer of Marine Causes | (1546–1832) | Head of the council. |
| 2 | Clerk Comptroller of the Navy | (1546–1832) | Head of naval spending became head of the navy board in 1660 |
| 3 | Clerk of the Kings Ships | 1320–1796 | Head of Administration of ships of the Crown |
| 4 | Keeper of the Kings Storehouses | (1546–1560) | Head of Naval Stores for the navy |
| 5 | Master of Naval Ordnance | (1546–1589) | special officer assigned to the Admiralty from the Office of Ordnance |
| 6 | Surveyor of Marine Victuals | (1561–1569) | Head of victualling for the navy |
| 7 | Surveyor and Rigger of the Navy | (1546–1859) | Head ship building and design and the dockyards renamed Surveyor of the Navy in 1611 |

Below this organisation was all HM Naval bases and dockyards each yard was administered by a Master Shipwright who was responsible for the management of their yards until the early 17th century when the navy board starts to introduce a more qualified naval administrator called Resident Commissioners of the Navy to manage the individual dockyards as the navy expands. In 1832 when the Navy Board is abolished Resident Commissioners were re-styled Admiral-superintendents.

Note: Carpenters later called shipwrights then master shipwrights had been a position in the English Navy from as early as 1327. The first official list of master shipwrights appeared in the patent issued by Henry VIII in 1537.

===== Naval bases and dockyards =====
Note: With the introduction of Resident Commissioners the Master Shipwright became a deputy to the resident commissioner but concentrated solely on shipbuilding.

Organization of Home Naval Base and Dockyards

- Navy Board-------------Royal Navy Dockyards, (1496–present)-------------Officers of the Dockyards

| # | Officers of the Dockyard | Responsibilities |
|---|---|---|
| 1 | Master Shipwright | (in charge of shipbuilding, ship repair/maintenance and management of the associated workforce) |
| 2 | Master Attendant | (in charge of launching and docking ships, of ships 'in ordinary' at the yard, and of ship movements around the harbour) |
| 3 | Storekeeper | (in charge of receiving, maintaining and issuing items in storage) |
| 4 | Clerk of the Cheque | (in charge of pay, personnel and certain transactions) |
| 5 | Clerk of the Survey | (in charge of maintaining a regular account of equipment and the transfer of goods) |

Note: Shipbuilding storehouses during this period were mainly used for masts, rigging and 'Cooperage’ (the making barrels in which most supplies were stored).

====== Portsmouth dockyard, (1496-present) ======
| # | Location | Post | Dates | Ref |
|---|---|---|---|---|
| 1 | Portsmouth Dockyard | Master Shipwright, Portsmouth Dockyard | (1638–1802) | |

====== Woolwich dockyard, (1496-present) ======
| # | Location | Post | dates | notes/ref |
|---|---|---|---|---|
| 1 | Woolwich Dockyard | Master Shipwright, Woolwich Dockyard | (1630–1801) | |

Woolwich Dockyard first established during the reign of Henry VIII in 1512, and continued to be an operational yard until 1869. In the 16th century an historically important ship was built at the “Henry Grace a Dieu” or “Great Harry” constructed in 1514.

====== Deptford dockyard, (1513–1869) ======
| # | Location | Post | Dates | Ref |
|---|---|---|---|---|
| 1 | Deptford Dockyard | Master Shipwright, Deptford Dockyard | (1550–1853) | |

Notes: Deptford dry dock, had been in regular use from the early years of Henry VIII's reign. Then known for innovative ship designing resulting in the production of a race-built warship the first of which was HMS Dreadnought launched in 1573 this led to a new phase in naval warfare. The dry dock was rebuilt in 1574.

====== Erith dockyard, (1514–1521) ======
| # | Location | Post | Dates | Ref |
|---|---|---|---|---|
| 1 | Erith Dockyard | Keeper of Kings Storehouse, Erith | | failed yard due to persistent flooding. |

====== Chatham, dockyard, (1567–1960) ======
| # | Location | Post | Dates | notes/ref |
|---|---|---|---|---|
| 1 | Chatham Dockyard | Master-Shipwright, Chatham Dockyard | (1572–1813) | |

=== Office of ordnance, (1415–1597) ===
Office of Ordnance

Notes:An Office of Ordnance was first created in 1415 in 1683 the Board of Ordnance was formed. In 1685 it became a civil Department of State.

==== Officers of the Ordnance ====
| # | Post | Dates | Notes/Ref |
|---|---|---|---|
| 1 | Master of the Ordnance | (1415–1597) | title renamed in 1560 to Master-General |
| 2 | Clerk of the Ordnance | (1460–1853) | reports to the Master of the Ordnance |
| 3 | Yeoman of the Ordnance | (1460–1597) | ditto |

=== Office of ordnance, (1597–1599) ===
- Office of the Board of Ordnance. (1597–1599)

==== Principal officers ====
| # | Post | Dates | Notes/Ref |
|---|---|---|---|
| 1 | Master-General of the Ordnance and Surveyor of Marine Causes | (1415–1855) | |
| 2 | Lieutenant-General of the Ordnance | (1545–1855) | reports to the Master General |
| 3 | Treasurer of the Ordinance | (1597–1855) | reports to the Lieutenant-General |
| 4 | Surveyor-General of the Ordnance | (1538–1888) | ditto |
| 5 | Clerk of the Ordnance | (1460–1853) | ditto |
| 6 | Storekeeper of the Ordnance | (1554–1845) | ditto |
| 7 | Clerk of Deliveries of the Ordnance | (1570–1853) | ditto |

Notes: Below this organisation were H.M. Ordnance yards and stores each had its on Senior Ordnance Officers (known as storekeepers).

===== Ordnance yards and stores =====
Home Ordnance Yards

| # | Location | Post | Dates | Notes/Ref |
|---|---|---|---|---|
| 1 | The Gun Wharf, Chatham Dockyard | Storekeeper of the Gun Wharf Chatham Dockyard | (1567–1855) | |

Gunpowder Magazines Stores

| # | Location | Post | Dates | Notes/Ref |
|---|---|---|---|---|
| 1 | Tower of London, London | Storekeeper of the Powder Stores, Tower of London | (1461–1855) | |
| 2 | Square Tower, Portsmouth | Storekeeper of the Powder Stores Portsmouth Dockyard | (1461–1855) | |

== Judicial administration ==
In the 19th and 20th centuries referred to as the Justice Department of the Royal Navy.

=== High court of the admiralty ===
England's Admiralty courts date to at least the 1340s, during the reign of Edward III. At that time there were three such courts, appointed by Admirals responsible for waters to the Admiral of the North, Admiral of the South and Admiral of the West of England. In 1483 it absorbed the jurisdiction of the deputies and courts these regional courts eventually amalgamated into a single High Court of Admiralty, administered by the Lord High Admiral of England. The Lord High Admiral directly appointed judges to the court, and could remove them at will. From its inception in 1483 until 1657 the Court sat in a disused church in Southwark, and from then until 1665 in Montjoy House, a private premises leased from the Dean of St Paul's Cathedral. The function of an admiralty court initially in the 14th century was to deal with piracy and other offences committed upon the high seas. However, it did not take long for those early courts to seek to manifest control over all things to do with shipping, such as mercantile matters. This led to a running battle between the admiralty courts and the common law courts as to which court had jurisdiction over particular issues.

| # | Post | Dates | Notes/Ref |
|---|---|---|---|
| 1 | Lord Admiral of England | 1360-current | Appointed the Judge of the High Court of Admiralty |
| 2 | Vice-Admiral of England and Deputy High Admiral | 1410-current | Assisted the Lord Admiral and responsible for administering the Vice-Admiralty courts |
| 3 | High Court of the Admiralty | 1340–1875 | |

==== Vice-admiralty courts ====
As a Vice-Admiral, the post holder was the chief of naval administration for his district. His responsibilities included, deciding the outcome of the Prize court (captured by pirate ships), dealing with salvage claims for wrecks, acting as a judge in relation to maritime issues.

The Vice Admiralty Court was a prerogative court established in the early 16th. A vice-admiralty court is in effect an admiralty court. The word “vice” in the name of the court denoted that the court represented the Lord Admiral of the United Kingdom. In English legal theory, the Lord Admiral, as vice-regal of the monarch, was the only person who had authority over matters relating to the sea. the holder of the post Vice-Admiral of the Coast was responsible for the defence of one of the twenty maritime counties of England, the North and South of Wales. The Lord Admiral would authorize others as his deputies or surrogates to act. Generally, he would appoint a person as a judge to sit in the court as his surrogate.

== Sources ==
- Allison, Ronald; Riddell, Sarah, eds. (1991). The Royal encyclopedia. Macmillan Academic and Professional. ISBN 978-0333538104.
- Baker, Sherston (2010). Office of Vice-Admiral of the Coast: being some account of that ancient office. Gale Ecco, Making Of Mode. ISBN 978-1240154067.
- Baugh, Daniel A. (2015). British Naval Administration in the Age of Walpole. Princeton University Press. ISBN 978-1400874637.
- Blomfield, R. Massie (1912). "Naval Executive Ranks". The Mariner's Mirror. 2 (4): 106–112. doi:10.1080/00253359.1912.10654589.
- Bothwell, J.S. (2004). Edward III and the English peerage : royal patronage, social mobility and political control in fourteenth-century England. Woodbridge: Boydell Press. ISBN 9781843830474.
- Brewer, J. S. (2015). Letters and Papers, Foreign and Domestic, of the Reign of Henry VIII 18 April 1514. Cambridge, England: Cambridge University Press.
- Campbell, John (1812). Lives of the British Admirals: Containing Also a New and Accurate Naval History, from the Earliest Periods. C. J. Barrinton. p. 245.
- Childs, David (2009). Tudor Sea Power: The Foundation of Greatness. Seaforth Publishing. ISBN 978-1473819924.
- Childs, David (2014). Pirate Nation: Elizabeth I and her Royal Sea Rovers. Seaforth Publishing. ISBN 978-1848322943.
- Childs, David (2014). The Warship Mary Rose: The Life and Times of King Henry VII's Flagship. Barnsley, England: Seaforth Publishing. ISBN 9781473853096
- Coad, J. G (1989). The royal dockyards, 1690-1850: architecture and engineering works of the sailing Navy. Scolar Press. ISBN 978-0859678032.
- Corbett, Julian Stafford (1917). Drake and the Tudor navy, with a history of the rise of England as a maritime power. Longmans, Green.
- Ehrman, John (2012). The Navy in the war of William III, 1689-1697: its state and direction. Cambridge University Press. ISBN 978-1107645110.
- Hall, Simon (1999). The Hutchinson Illustrated Encyclopedia of British History. Taylor & Francis. ISBN 978-1579581077.
- Hamilton, Admiral Sir. R. Vesey, G.C.B. (1896). Naval Administration: The Constitution, Character, and Functions of the Board of Admiralty, and of the Civil Departments it Directs. London: George Bell and Sons.
- HMSO (1963). Guide to the contents of the Public Record Office. Vol. 2. State Papers and Department records. HMSO.
- Knighton, C. S.; Loades, David, eds. (2011). The Navy of Edward VI and Mary I. Farnham, Surrey: Ashgate for the Navy Records Society. ISBN 978-1-4094-1847-4.
- Knighton, C. S.; Loades, David (2016). Elizabethan Naval Administration. Routledge. ISBN 978-1317145035.
- Logan, Karen Dale (1976). The Admiralty: Reforms and Re-organization, 1868–1892. Unpublished Ph.D. dissertation. University of Oxford.
- Miller, Francis H. (1884). The Origin and Constitution of the Admiralty and Navy Boards, to which is added an Account of the various Buildings in which the Business of the Navy has been transacted from time to time. London: For Her Majesty's Stationery Office. Copy in Greene Papers. National Maritime Museum. GEE/19.
- Nelson, Arthur (2001). The Tudor navy : the ships, men and organisation 1485 - 1603. Conway Maritime Press. ISBN 978-0851777856.
- Perry, Marvin (2015). Western Civilization: A Brief History. Cengage Learning. ISBN 9781305537750.
- "Publications of the Navy Records Society". 11. George Allen & Unwin. 1898: 28.
- Rodger, N.A.M. (1979). The Admiralty (Offices of State). T. Dalton. ISBN 978-0900963940.
- Rodger, N.A.M. (1998). The safeguard of the sea : a naval history of Britain, 660-1649. W.W. Norton. ISBN 978-0393319606.
- Rodger, N.A.M. (2004). "17: The Council of the Marine: (Administration 1509–1574)". The safeguard of the sea : a naval history of Britain. New York: W.W. Norton. pp. 221–238. ISBN 9780140297249.
- Rose, Susan (2013). England's Medieval Navy 1066-1509: Ships, Men & Warfare. Seaforth Publishing. ISBN 9781473853546.
- Sainty, Sir John. "Office-Holders in Modern Britain | Institute of Historical Research". history.ac.uk. University of London, Historical Research Institute. Retrieved 1 February 2017.
- Sainty, J. C.; Thrush, R. D. (28 September 2006). "Office-Holders: Vice Admirals of the Coasts 1558–1660". web.archive.org. The Institute of Historical Research: University of London, England, 5 Apr 2005 – 8 Nov 2016. Retrieved 26 June 2018.
- The Statutes of the United Kingdom of Great Britain and Ireland, 3 George IV. 1822. London: By His Majesty's Statute and Law Printer. 1822.
- Tittler, Robert; Jones, Norman L. (2008). A Companion to Tudor Britain. John Wiley & Sons. ISBN 978-1405137409.
- Wotton, Thomas (1741). The Baronetage: Containing a Genealogical and Historical Account of All the English Baronets, Now Existing: Their Descents, Marriages, and Issues ... T. Wotton.
