= List of vice-admirals of the coast =

Vice Admiral of the Coast
- Active: 1536 – Present
- Countries: Kingdom of England; Kingdom of Ireland; Kingdom of Scotland; Kingdom of Great Britain
- Branch: Royal Navy
- Type: Naval administration
- Role: Admiralty courts, naval jurisdiction.

The vice-admiralties of the coast were posts established in each of the twenty maritime counties of England, the north and south of Wales, and the four provinces of Ireland. The officer holders, designated as "vice-admirals", were responsible for naval administration in their county, and were deputies of the Lord High Admiral. The role was introduced to replace the Wardens of the Coast.

A vice-admiral's responsibilities included, deciding the lawfulness of prizes captured by privateers, dealing with salvage claims for wrecks, acting as a judge and implementing the role of the Impress Service. The earliest record of an appointment was of William Gonson as Vice-Admiral of Norfolk and Suffolk in 1536.

From around 1560, vice-admirals of the coasts acquired a more public profile than they had enjoyed previously. In the second half of the sixteenth century they increasingly received orders from the privy council. In 1561, apparently for the first time, the Crown addressed instructions directly to the vice-admirals. In 1660 their function came under the remit of the Board of Admiralty.

There are also a few examples of the title Vice-Admiral of the West. It is not however clear whether this was a separate appointment or possibly some incorrect use of an older title being applied to the holders of the Cornwall or Devon post.

In 2023 prior to the coronation of Charles III, Edward Stanley, 19th Earl of Derby was appointed the Vice Admiral of Lancashire.

== List of vice-admiralties ==
=== England ===
- Vice-Admiral of Cheshire
- Vice-Admiral of Cornwall (including the Isles of Scilly)
- Vice-Admiral of Cumberland
- Vice-Admiral of Devon
- Vice-Admiral of Dorset
- Vice-Admiral of Durham
- Vice-Admiral of Essex
- Vice-Admiral of Gloucester
- Vice-Admiral of Hampshire (including the Isle of Wight)
- Vice-Admiral of Kent
- Vice-Admiral of Lancashire
- Vice-Admiral of Lincolnshire
- Vice-Admiral of Norfolk
- Vice-Admiral of Northumberland
- Vice-Admiral of Somerset
- Vice-Admiral of Suffolk
- Vice-Admiral of Sussex
- Vice-Admiral of Westmorland
- Vice-Admiral of Yorkshire

=== Wales ===
- Vice-Admiral of North Wales
- Vice-Admiral of South Wales
- Vice-Admiral of Carmarthen
- Vice-Admiral of Pembroke

=== Scotland ===
- Vice-Admiral of Scotland
- Vice-Admiral of Orkney and Shetland
- Vice-Admiral of the Western Coast

=== Ireland ===
- Vice-Admiral of Ireland
- Vice-Admiral of Connaught
- Vice-Admiral of Leinster
- Vice-Admiral of Munster
- Vice-Admiral of Ulster

== See also ==
Lord-lieutenant - a post created in the 1540's to oversee the militia of a county
