= Mompesson =

Mompesson is a surname of English origin. Notable people with this surname includes:

- Giles Mompesson (1583–1663), Member of the British Parliament (1614–1621)
- William Mompesson (1639–1709), Church of England clergyman
- Richard Mompesson (died 1627), English politician and Member of Parliament (1593)
- Roger Mompesson (1661 – 1715), Member of the British Parliament (1699–1701)
