= Bill Ivy (disambiguation) =

Bill Ivy (1942–1969) was a British Grand Prix motorcycle road racer.

Bill or William Ivy may also refer to:

- 'Wild' Bill Ivy, fictional boxer in Greatest Heavyweights
- Bill Ivy of 1946 Northwestern Wildcats football team and 1946 All-Big Nine Conference football team
- William Ivy (balloonist) (1866–1953), later known as Ivy Baldwin

== See also ==
- Bill Ivey (1944–2025), seventh chairman of the National Endowment for the Arts
- William Ive (disambiguation)
