= William Ives =

William Ives or Bill Ives may refer to:

- William Bullock Ives (1841–1899), Canadian politician; President of the Privy Council and Minister of Trade and Commerce
- William Carlos Ives (1873–1950), Canadian politician
- Bill Ives (rugby league) (1896–1975), Australian rugby league player
- Bill Ives (ice hockey) (born 1941), Canadian ice hockey player
- William Ives (businessman) (1943–2017)
- Grayston Ives or Bill Ives (born 1948), English composer
- Bill Ives (footballer), New Zealand international football (soccer) player

== See also ==
- William Ive (disambiguation)
