= Vice-Admiral of the coast of County Durham =

Vice Admiral of Durham
- Active: 1559–1835.
- Country: United Kingdom
- Branch: Royal Navy
- Type: Naval administration
- Role: Admiralty court and Naval Jurisdiction.

The Vice-Admiral of the coast of Durham was responsible for the defence County Durham, England.

== History ==
As a Vice-Admiral, the post holder was the chief of naval administration for his district. His responsibilities included pressing men for naval service, deciding the lawfulness of prizes (captured by privateers), dealing with salvage claims for wrecks and acting as a judge.

The earliest record of an appointment was of Reginald Beseley in 1559.

In 1863, the Registrar of the Admiralty Court stated that the offices had 'for many years been purely honorary' (HCA 50/24 pp. 235–6). Appointments were made by the Lord High Admiral when this officer existed. When the admiralty was in commission appointments were made by the crown by letters patent under the seal of the admiralty court.

== Vice-Admirals of Durham ==
This is a list of people who have served as Vice-Admiral of Durham.

- 1559: Reginald Beseley (also Vice-Admiral of Yorkshire 1559–1563, Vice-Admiral of Northumberland 1559–?, Vice-Admiral of Cumberland 1559–1563 and Vice-Admiral of Westmorland 1559–?)
- 1559–63: Vacant
- 1563: William Eure, 2nd Baron Eure (also Vice-Admiral of Yorkshire 1563–1564)
- 1563–1568: Vacant
- 1568: Valentine Browne (also Vice-Admiral of Northumberland 1563–1564 and 1568–1574 and Vice-Admiral of Westmorland 1568–1574)
- 1568–1575: Vacant
- 1575–1596: Henry Carey, 1st Baron Hunsdon (also Vice-Admiral of Northumberland 1575–1596, Vice-Admiral of Cumberland 1586 – aft. 1587 and Vice-Admiral of Westmorland 1575 – aft. 1587)
- 1596 Richard Mompesson (also Vice-Admiral of Northumberland 1596–1604 and Vice-Admiral of Cumberland ?–1604)
- 1596–1611: Vacant
- 1611–1640: Theophilus Howard, Lord Howard (Earl of Suffolk from 1626) (also Vice-Admiral of Northumberland 1611-1640 and Vice-Admiral of Cumberland 1611–1640)
- 1640: Sir John Delaval (also Vice-Admiral of Northumberland 1640–1641)
- 1640–1652: Vacant
- 1652: John Fenwick
- 1652–1660: Vacant
- 1661–1685: Charles Howard, 1st Earl of Carlisle (also Vice-Admiral of Northumberland 1661–1685, Vice-Admiral of Cumberland 1661-1685 and Vice-Admiral of Westmorland 1661–1685)
- 1685–1687: Vacant
- 1687–1689: John Sheffield, 3rd Earl of Mulgrave (also Vice-Admiral of Northumberland 1687–1689 and Vice-Admiral of Yorkshire 1659–1692)
- 1689–1702: Richard Lumley, 1st Viscount Lumley (Earl of Scarbrough from 1690) (also Vice-Admiral of Northumberland 1689–1703)
- 1702–1710: Nathaniel Crew, 3rd Baron Crew
- 1710: Richard Lumley, 1st Earl of Scarbrough
- 1710–1740: Richard Lumley, Viscount Lumley (Earl of Scarbrough from 1721)
- 1740–1755: Vacant
- 1755–1758: Henry Vane, 1st Earl of Darlington
- 1758–1795: Vacant
- 1795–1842: William Vane, 3rd Earl of Darlington (Marquess of Cleveland 1827–1833, Duke of Cleveland from 1833)
- 1842–1854: Charles Vane, 3rd Marquess of Londonderry
