= Vice-Admiral of Cumberland =

Vice Admiral of Cumberland
- Active: 1559-1835.
- Country: United Kingdom
- Branch: Royal Navy
- Type: Naval administration
- Role: Admiralty court and Naval Jurisdiction.

The holder of the post Vice-Admiral of Cumberland was responsible for the defence of the county of Cumberland, England.

As a Vice-Admiral, the post holder was the chief of naval administration for his district. His responsibilities included pressing men for naval service, deciding the lawfulness of prizes (captured by privateers), dealing with salvage claims for wrecks and acting as a judge.

The earliest record of an appointment was of Reginald Beseley 1559–1563.

In 1863 the Registrar of the Admiralty Court stated that the offices had 'for many years been purely honorary' (HCA 50/24 pp. 235–6). Appointments were made by the Lord High Admiral when this officer existed. When the admiralty was in commission appointments were made by the crown by letters patent under the seal of the admiralty court.

== Vice Admiral of Cumberland ==
This is a list of people who have been Vice-Admiral of Cumberland.

- Reginald Beseley 1559–1563 (also Vice-Admiral of Northumberland 1559–, Vice-Admiral of Durham 1559, Vice-Admiral of Westmorland 1559– and Vice-Admiral of Yorkshire 1559–1563)
- Thomas Willson 1563–1569?
- Henry Carey, 1st Baron Hunsdon 1586 – aft. 1587 (also Vice-Admiral of Northumberland 1575–1596, Vice-Admiral of Durham 1575–1596 and Vice-Admiral of Westmorland 1575 – aft. 1587)
- Sir Robert Carey 1594–?
- Sir Richard Mompesson ?–1604 (also Vice-Admiral of Northumberland 1596–1604 and Vice-Admiral of Durham 1596)
- George Hume, 1st Earl of Dunbar 1604–1611 (also Vice-Admiral of Northumberland 1604–1611)
- Theophilus Howard, 2nd Earl of Suffolk 1611–1640 (also Vice-Admiral of Northumberland 1611–1640, Vice-Admiral of Durham 1611-1640 and Vice-Admiral of Westmorland 1622–1640)
- vacant
- Interregnum
- Charles Howard, 1st Earl of Carlisle 1661–1685 (also Vice-Admiral of Northumberland, 1661–1685, Vice-Admiral of Durham, 1661-1685 and Vice-Admiral of Westmorland 1661–1685)
- John Lowther, 1st Viscount Lonsdale 1686–1700 (also Vice-Admiral of Westmorland 1686–1700)
- vacant
- Sir Richard Musgrave, 2nd Baronet 1702–1710 (also Vice-Admiral of Westmorland 1701–1710)
- Sir William Pennington, 1st Baronet 1710–1715 (also Vice-Admiral of Westmorland 1710–1715)
- Sir James Lowther, 4th Baronet 1715–1755 (also Vice-Admiral of Westmorland 1715–1755)
- Charles Wyndham, 2nd Earl of Egremont 1755–1763 (also Vice-Admiral of Westmorland 1686–1700)
- vacant
- James Lowther, 1st Earl of Lonsdale 1765–1802 (also Vice-Admiral of Westmorland 1765–1802)
- vacant
- William Lowther, 1st Earl of Lonsdale 1809–1844
