= William Ive =

William Ive may refer to:

- William Ive (Mayor of Sandwich, 1348–1349)
- William Ive (Sandwich MP), MP for Sandwich in 1386, son of the above
- William Ive, Coventry preacher and commentator on Loveday, 1458
- William Ive (vice-chancellor), Vice-Chancellor of the University of Oxford in 1461 and 1462
- William Ive, Vice-Admiral of Essex for 1577
- William Ive (Leicester MP) (1597–1641), English MP in 1624

== See also ==
- William Ives (disambiguation)
