= Blackheath Army =

Historic English Army

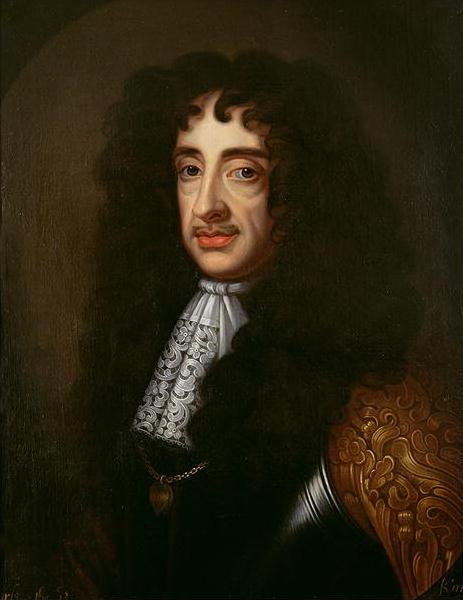
Charles II raised the army as part of the Third Anglo-Dutch War, but the force was disbanded without ever seeing action

The Blackheath Army was a contingent of the English Army assembled at Blackheath in Kent during the summer of 1673. The army consisting of old and newly raised regiments were placed under the command of the French Huguenot Frederick Schomberg. It was intended to use the Blackheath Army to attack the Dutch coastal province of Zealand, as part of the English contribution to the Third Anglo-Dutch War. However the Zealand Expedition was abandoned following the defeat of the Royal Navy at the Battle of Texel (August 1673). The newly raised regiments were disbanded and the army returned to its smaller pre-war size.

== History ==
The standing army of England remained relatively small during the Restoration era. In order to meet the needs of the war, several fresh regiments were raised by leading figures such as the Earl of Carlisle and Duke of Albemarle. The ranks were filled with freshly recruited levies, with the odd scattering of more experienced men from the standing army or those who had seen foreign service in Continental armies. By 1673 the paper strength of the Blackheath force was 12,000 men. Although it was planned to put the force under martial law, this was abandoned following objections in Parliament. There was some rivalry over the command of the army between Schomberg and the Duke of Buckingham, one of the regimental commanders, and the two men almost fought a duel. It was widely reported that the Duke of Monmouth, Charles II's eldest son, would be given command in their place but this did not happen.

The plan to attack Zealand was drawn up by Sir Joseph Williamson. It was based on the belief that England's ally France would make further gains of land against the Dutch Republic, but a counter-offensive by William of Orange and his Spanish allies undermined this strategy. The army was supposed to have assembled by June 1673, but several regiments were late in arriving at Blackheath. On 18 July the expedition finally set off. It was first transported to Great Yarmouth while Prince Rupert's fleet was to clear a passage for them to cross the North Sea. On 21 August Rupert's Anglo-French fleet suffered a defeat at the Battle of Texel. This led to the cancellation of the Zealand expedition.

Following the conclusion of peace with the Dutch Republic, the army's future remained open to question. It was recurring fear of some in the English Parliament that the King would use a large standing army in peacetime to force absolute rule on the country. Under pressure, Charles agreed to disband the newly raised regiments and return the army to its smaller pre-war size. By contrast, a decade later Charles' younger brother James II did not reduce the size of the army following its expansion to meet Monmouth's Rebellion in 1685.

== Bibliography ==
- Childs, John (1976). The Army of Charles II. Routledge.
- Watson, J.N.P (1997). Captain General and Rebel Chief: The Life of James, Duke of Monmouth. George Allen & Unwin.
