= Charles Howard, 1st Earl of Carlisle =

English soldier and politician

Charles Howard
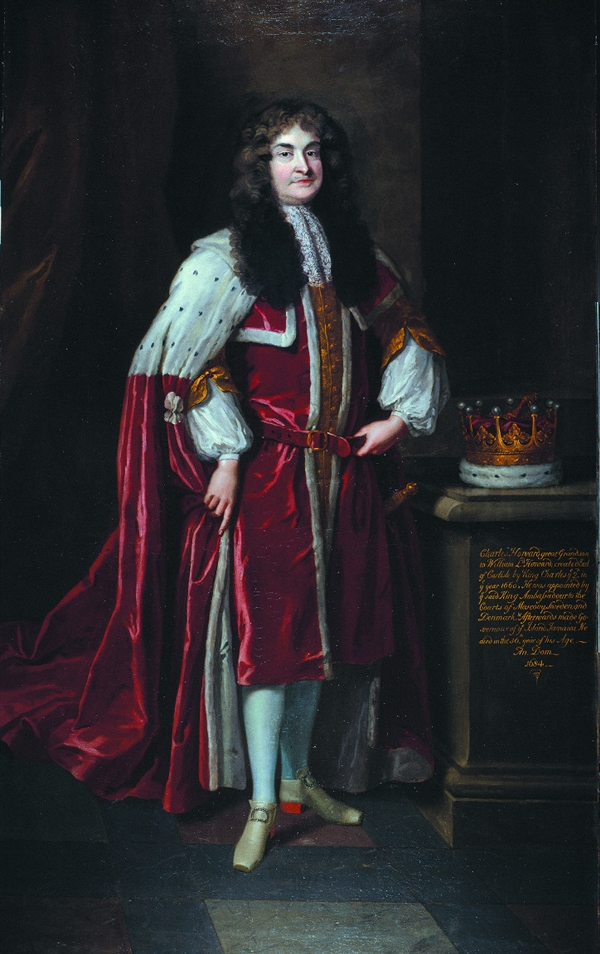
- The Earl of Carlisle

Member of Parliament for Cumberland
- In office 1660–1661 Serving with Wilfrid Lawson

Member of Parliament for Cumberland
- In office 1654–1656 Serving with William Briscoe

High Sheriff of Cumberland
- In office 1650

Personal details
- Born: 1628
- Died: 24 February 1685 (aged 56–57)
- Spouse: Anne Howard
- Children: 6, including Edward
- Military career
- Allegiance: Great Britain
- Rank: Lieutenant-General
- Commands: Blackheath Army
- Conflicts: Battle of Worcester

Charles Howard, 1st Earl of Carlisle (1628 – 24 February 1685) was an English military leader and politician who sat in the House of Commons at various times between 1653 and 1660 and was created Earl of Carlisle in 1661.

== Biography ==
Howard was the son and heir of Sir William Howard of Naworth in Cumberland, by Mary, daughter of William Eure, 4th Baron Eure and great-grandson of Lord William Howard, "Belted Will" (1563–1640), the third son of Thomas Howard, 4th Duke of Norfolk. In 1645 he conformed to the Church of England and supported the government of the Commonwealth, being appointed High Sheriff of Cumberland in 1650. He bought Carlisle Castle and became governor of the town. He distinguished himself at the Battle of Worcester on Oliver Cromwell's side and made a member of the council of state in 1653, chosen captain of the protector's bodyguard and selected to carry out various public duties. In 1653 he was nominated as Member of Parliament for the Four Northern Counties in the Barebones Parliament. He was elected MP for Cumberland in 1654.

In 1655 Howard was given a regiment, was appointed a commissioner to try the northern rebels, and a deputy major-general of Cumberland, Westmorland and Northumberland. He was re-elected MP for Cumberland in 1656. In 1657 he was included in Cromwell's House of Lords and voted for the protector's assumption of the royal title the same year. In 1659 he urged Richard Cromwell to defend his government by force against the army leaders, but his advice being refused he used his influence in favour of a restoration of the monarchy, and after Richard's fall he was imprisoned. In April 1660 he sat again in parliament for Cumberland, and at the Restoration was made custos rotulorum and Lord Lieutenant of Cumberland and Lord Lieutenant of Westmorland.

On 20 April 1661 Howard was created Baron Dacre of Gillesland, Viscount Howard of Morpeth, and Earl of Carlisle; the same year he was made Vice-Admiral of Northumberland, Cumberland and Durham, and in 1662 joint commissioner for the office of Earl Marshal. In 1663 he was appointed ambassador to Russia, Sweden and Denmark, and in 1668 he carried the Garter to Charles XI of Sweden.

In 1667 Howard was made lieutenant-general of the forces and joint commander-in-chief of the four northernmost counties. In 1672 he became one of the commissioners for the office of Lord Lieutenant of Durham, and in 1673 deputy earl marshal. He commanded a regiment in the fresh-raised Blackheath Army of 1673, which was intended to see action against the Dutch. Following the Treaty of Westminster the regiment was disbanded.

In 1678 he was appointed governor of Jamaica, but his instructions to introduce Poynings' Law to the island were successfully opposed by planters elected to the Jamaican Assembly. Calling the elected members "fools, asses, beggars and cowards", the governor arrested their leaders, William Beeston (governor) and Samuel Long, father of Jamaican planter-historian Edward Long. However, when they were deported back to England, Beeston and Long successfully argued their case, and the governor's instructions were cancelled. He was reappointed governor of Carlisle. He died in 1685, and was buried in York Minster. Carlisle Street in the City of Port Phillip was named in his honour.

== Family ==
He married Anne (died 1696), daughter of Edward Howard, 1st Baron Howard of Escrick and great-granddaughter of Thomas Howard, 4th Duke of Norfolk, by whom he had six children:

- Edward Howard, 2nd Earl of Carlisle (c. 1646–1692)
- Lady Katherine Howard (29 July 1662 – March 1682)
- Frederick Christian Howard (5 November 1664 – October 1684), killed at the Siege of Luxembourg
- Charles Howard (5 September 1668 – 3 April 1670)
- Lady Mary Howard (died 27 October 1708), married Sir John Fenwick, 3rd Baronet
- Lady Anne Howard, married Richard Graham, 1st Viscount Preston

Colonel Thomas Howard (died 1678), notorious for the 1662 duel where he left Henry Jermyn, 1st Baron Dover for dead (they were rivals for the affections of Anna Talbot, Countess of Shrewsbury), was his younger brother. He was pardoned and soon afterwards married as her third husband Mary Stewart, Duchess of Richmond.

Parliament of England
Preceded by Not represented in Barebones Parliament	Member of Parliament for Cumberland; 1654–1656; With: William Briscoe	Succeeded by William Briscoe; Sir Wilfrid Lawson
Preceded by William Briscoe; Sir Wilfrid Lawson	Member of Parliament for Cumberland; 1660–1661; With: Sir Wilfrid Lawson	Succeeded by Sir Patricius Curwen, Bt; Sir George Fletcher, Bt
Honorary titles
English Interregnum	Lord Lieutenant of Cumberland and Westmorland; 1660–1685	Succeeded by The Earl of Thanet
English Interregnum	Custos Rotulorum of Cumberland; 1660–1685	Succeeded by The Earl of Thanet
English Interregnum	Vice-Admiral of Cumberland and Westmorland; 1661–1685	Succeeded by Sir John Lowther, Bt
English Interregnum	Vice-Admiral of Durham and Northumberland; 1661–1685	Vacant Title next held by The Earl of Mulgrave
Government offices
Preceded by Sir Henry Morgan, acting	Lieutenant Governor of Jamaica; 1678–1680	Succeeded by Sir Henry Morgan, acting
Peerage of England
New title	Earl of Carlisle; 1661–1685	Succeeded by Edward Howard
