= William Briscoe (politician) =

English lawyer and politician

William Brisco (c. 1606 – 25 February 1688) was an English lawyer and politician who sat in the House of Commons between 1654 and 1660.

Brisco was the son of John Briscoe of Crofton, Cumberland and his wife Mary Braithwaite, daughter of Sir Thomas Braithwaite of Burneshead, Westmorland. He matriculated at Queen's College, Oxford on 12 December 1623, aged 17 and was called to the bar after studying law at Lincoln's Inn in 1634.

Brisco served as a justice of the peace for Cumberland from 1642 to 1662 and was appointed High Sheriff of Cumberland for 1650–51. In 1654, he was elected member of parliament for Cumberland in the First Protectorate Parliament. He was re-elected in 1656 for the Second Protectorate Parliament and in 1659 for the Third Protectorate Parliament. In 1660, Briscoe was elected MP for Carlisle in the Convention Parliament.

Brisco married firstly on 26 November 1635, Susanna Cranfield, daughter of Sir Randal Cranfield of London and Sutton-at-Hone, Kent and had a son. He married secondly before 12 May 1643, Susanna Brown, daughter of Francis Brown, Haberdasher of London and had three sons and five daughters.

Parliament of England
Preceded by Charles Howard	Member of Parliament for Cumberland; 1654–1659; With: Charles Howard 1654–1656; Sir Wilfrid Lawson, 1st Baronet, of Isell	Succeeded by Not represented in restored Rump
