= List of vice-admirals of South Wales =

Vice Admiral of South Wales
- Country: United Kingdom
- Branch: Royal Navy
- Type: Naval administration
- Role: Admiralty court and Naval Jurisdiction.

The Vice-Admiral of South Wales was responsible for the coastal defence of South Wales.

== History ==
As a vice-admiral, the post holder was the chief of naval administration for his district. His responsibilities included pressing men for naval service, deciding the lawfulness of prizes (captured by privateers), dealing with salvage claims for wrecks and acting as a judge.

In 1863 the registrar of the Admiralty Court stated that the offices had 'for many years been purely honorary' (HCA 50/24 pp. 235–6). Appointments were made by the Lord High Admiral when this officer existed. When the admiralty was in commission appointments were made by the crown by letters patent under the seal of the admiralty court.

== Vice-admirals of South Wales ==
Source (1559–1560):

Source (1660–1754):

Glamorgan

- 1559–1570 William Herbert
- 1574 David Lewes
- 1576 Sir Nicholas Herbert

Cardigan, Carmarthen and Pembroke

- 1565–Sir John Perrot
- 1569 Walter Devereux, 2nd Viscount Hereford
- 1576 Sir William Morgan (died 1583)
- 1582 Thomas Williams
- 1583–1584 John Morgan Wolfe

Cardigan, Carmarthen, Glamorgan and Pembroke

- 1585–1601 Henry Herbert, 2nd Earl of Pembroke (died 1601)
- 1601–1630 William Herbert, 3rd Earl of Pembroke
- 1630–1650 Philip Herbert, 4th Earl of Pembroke
- 1650–1660 No appointment known
- 1660–1662 William Russell
- 1662–1689 Sir Edward Mansel, 4th Baronet
- 1689–1713 John Vaughan, 3rd Earl of Carbery
- 1714–1715 Thomas Mansell, 1st Baron Mansell
- 1715–1754 Charles Powlett, Marquess of Winchester (Duke of Bolton from 1722)
