= Max Kaminsky =

Max Kaminsky may refer to:

- Max Kaminsky (musician) (1908–1994), jazz musician
- Max Kaminsky (ice hockey) (1912–1961), ice hockey player and coach
