= List of vice-admirals of the western coast =

This is a list of the vice-admirals of the western coast (of Scotland).

== Vice-admirals of the western coast ==
- 1730–1743 John Campbell, 2nd Duke of Argyll
- 1744–1761 Archibald Campbell, 3rd Duke of Argyll
- 1762–1770 John Campbell, 4th Duke of Argyll
- 1770–1806 John Campbell, 5th Duke of Argyll
- 1807–1839 George Campbell, 6th Duke of Argyll
- 1840–1862 John Campbell, 2nd Marquess of Breadalbane
- 1863–1900 George Campbell, 8th Duke of Argyll
