= List of vice-admirals of Kent =

Vice Admiral of Kent
- Active: 1558-1846
- Country: United Kingdom
- Branch: Royal Navy
- Type: Naval administration
- Role: Admiralty court and Naval Jurisdiction.

The Vice-Admiral of Kent was responsible for the defence of the county of Kent, England.

== History ==
As a vice-admiral, the post holder was the chief of naval administration for his district. His responsibilities included pressing men for naval service, deciding the lawfulness of prizes (captured by privateers), dealing with salvage claims for wrecks and acting as a judge.

The earliest record of an appointment was of William Brooke, 10th Baron Cobham 1559–1597.

In 1863 the registrar of the Admiralty Court stated that the offices had "for many years been purely honorary" (HCA 50/24 pp. 235–6). Appointments were made by the Lord High Admiral when this officer existed. When the admiralty was in commission appointments were made by the crown by letters patent under the seal of the admiralty court.

== Vice-admirals of Kent ==
This is a list of people who have served as Vice-Admiral of Kent. From 1585 to 1607, a separate vice-admiral was appointed for the Hundred of Milton.

- William Brooke, 10th Baron Cobham 1559–1597
- The Vice-admiral of Kent was vacant 1597-1607
- Sir Edward Hoby 1607–1617
- Sir Francis Howard 1617–1626
- Sir Thomas Walsingham 1626–1659
- The Vice-admiral of Kent was vacant 1659-1668
- Charles Stewart, 3rd Duke of Richmond 1668–1672
- Heneage Finch, 3rd Earl of Winchilsea 1673–1687
- Christopher Roper, 5th Baron Teynham 1687–1689
- Henry Sydney, 1st Earl of Romney 1689–1702
- Charles Finch, 4th Earl of Winchilsea 1702–1705
- Lewis Watson, 1st Earl of Rockingham 1705–1724
- Lionel Sackville, 1st Duke of Dorset 1725–1765
- The Vice-admiral of Kent was vacant 1765-1808
- John Pratt, 1st Marquess Camden 1808–1840

== Vice-admirals of the Hundred of Milton ==
- Sir Edward Hoby 1585–1607
- merged with Kent
