= Vice-Admiral of Devon =

Vice Admiral of Devon
- Active: 1559-1835
- Country: England; Great Britain; United Kingdom
- Branch: Royal Navy
- Type: Naval administration
- Role: Admiralty court and Naval Jurisdiction.

The holder of the post Vice-Admiral of Devon was responsible for the defence of the county of Devon, England.

== History ==
As a Vice-Admiral, the post holder was the chief of naval administration for his district. His responsibilities included pressing men for naval service, deciding the lawfulness of prizes (captured by privateers), dealing with salvage claims for wrecks and acting as a judge.

The earliest record of an appointment was of George Basset 1558.

In 1863 the Registrar of the Admiralty Court stated that the offices had 'for many years been purely honorary' (HCA 50/24 pp. 235-6). Appointments were made by the Lord High Admiral when this officer existed. When the admiralty was in commission appointments were made by the crown by letters patent under the seal of the admiralty court.

== Vice-Admirals of Devon ==
This is a list of people who have been Vice-Admiral of Devon. Between 1603 and 1623, a separate command existed for North Devon.

- George Basset 1558
- John Courtenay 1558–1560 with
- Robert Yeo 1558–1560
- George Basset 1560
- Robert Yeo 1560–1562
- Sir Arthur Champernowne 1562–1578
- Robert Hill 1578–1582
- vacant?
- Edward Seymour bef. 1584–1585?
- Sir Walter Raleigh 1585–1603
- Sir Richard Hawkins 1603–August 1606, April 1607–1610
- Sir Richard Cowper 1610–1615
- Sir Lewis Stukley 1615–1619
- Sir Edward Seymour, 2nd Baronet 1619–1622
- Sir John Eliot 1622–1626
- Sir John Drake 1626–1628 with
- Sir James Bagg 1626–1638 with
- Sir Edward Seymour, 2nd Baronet bef. 1634–1642 with
- John Harris 1638–1642
- vacant
- Sir John Berkeley 1644 (Royalist)
- John Waddon 1644 (Parliamentarian)
- John Eliot 1645–1655 (Parliamentarian)
- Henry Hatsell 1655–1660 (Parliamentarian)
- John Eliot 1660 (Parliamentarian)
- Sir Hugh Pollard, 2nd Baronet 1660–1666
- Sir John Fowell, 2nd Baronet 1666–1677
- Sir Edward Seymour, 3rd Baronet 1677–1688
- George Courtenay 1689–1715
- Sir Francis Drake, 3rd Baronet 1715–1717
- Jonathan Elford 1718–1727
- Theophilus Fortescue 1727–1746
- vacant
- John Russell, 4th Duke of Bedford 1761–1771
- vacant
- Hugh Fortescue, 1st Earl Fortescue 1831–1839
- Hugh Fortescue, 2nd Earl Fortescue 1839–1861

== Vice-Admirals of North Devon ==
- William Bourchier, 3rd Earl of Bath 1603–1623
