= List of vice-admirals of Gloucestershire =

Vice Admiral of Gloucestershire
- Active: 1559-1835.
- Country: United Kingdom
- Branch: Royal Navy
- Type: Naval administration
- Role: Admiralty court and Naval Jurisdiction.

The Vice-Admiral of Gloucestershire was responsible for the defence of the county of Gloucestershire, England.

== History ==
As a vice-admiral, the post holder was the chief of naval administration for his district. His responsibilities included pressing men for naval service, deciding the lawfulness of prizes (captured by privateers), dealing with salvage claims for wrecks and acting as a judge.

The earliest record of an appointment was of Edmund Brydges, 2nd Baron Chandos 1559–1573.

In 1863 the Registrar of the Admiralty Court stated that the offices had 'for many years been purely honorary' (HCA 50/24 pp. 235–6). Appointments were made by the Lord High Admiral when this officer existed. When the admiralty was in commission appointments were made by the crown by letters patent under the seal of the admiralty court.

== Vice-admirals of Gloucestershire ==
This is a list of people who have served as Vice-Admiral of Gloucestershire.

- Edmund Brydges, 2nd Baron Chandos 1559–1573
- Giles Brydges, 3rd Baron Chandos 1573–1582
- vacant
- Edward Stafford, 3rd Baron Stafford 1586–1603
- Henry Berkeley, 7th Baron Berkeley 1603–1613
- vacant
- Sir William Guise 1626–1642
- English Interregnum
- Thomas Chester 1660–1690
- Sir John Guise, 2nd Baronet 1690–1695
- Sir John Guise, 3rd Baronet 1696–1702
- John Grobham Howe 1702–1712
- John Howe 1712–1715
- James Berkeley, 3rd Earl of Berkeley 1715–1736
- Augustus Berkeley, 4th Earl of Berkeley 1737–1755
- Matthew Ducie Moreton, 2nd Baron Ducie 1755–1762
- Norborne Berkeley, 4th Baron Botetourt 1762–1766
- Frederick Berkeley, 5th Earl of Berkeley 1766–1810
- Henry Somerset, 6th Duke of Beaufort 1810–1835
