= Bill Ives (ice hockey) =

Canadian ice hockey player

- Born: August 9, 1941 (age 83); Chippawa, Ontario, Canada
- Height: 6 ft 0 in (183 cm)
- Weight: 175 lb (79 kg; 12 st 7 lb)
- Position: Center
- Shot: Left
- Played for: Johnstown Jets; Salem Rebels
- Playing career: 1955–1969

William Edwin Ives (born August 9, 1941) is a Canadian retired professional hockey player who played 421 games in the Eastern Hockey League with the Johnstown Jets and Salem Rebels.
