= Vice-Admiral of the coast of Dorset =

Vice Admiral of Dorset
- Active: 1559–1835
- Country: United Kingdom
- Branch: Royal Navy
- Type: Naval administration
- Role: Admiralty court and Naval Jurisdiction.

The Vice-Admiral of Dorset was responsible for the defence of the County of Dorset, England.

As a Vice-Admiral, the post holder was the chief of naval administration for his district. His responsibilities included pressing men for naval service, deciding the lawfulness of prizes (captured by privateers), dealing with salvage claims for wrecks and acting as a judge.

== History ==
In 1863 the Registrar of the Admiralty Court stated that the offices had 'for many years been purely honorary' (HCA 50/24 pp. 235–6). Appointments were made by the Lord High Admiral when this officer existed. When the admiralty was in commission appointments were made by the crown by letters patent under the seal of the admiralty court.

== Vice Admirals of Dorset ==
This is a list of people who have been Vice-Admiral of Dorset.

- c.1526–1536: Giles Strangways
- 1551–1580: Lord Thomas Howard (Viscount Howard of Bindon from 1559)
- 1580–1582: Vacant
- 1582: Henry Ashley
- 1582–1591: Sir Christopher Hatton
- 1591–1603: Sir Carew Raleigh
- 1603–1611: Thomas Howard, 3rd Viscount Howard of Bindon
- 1611–1640: Theophilus Howard, 2nd Baron Howard de Walden (Earl of Suffolk from 1626)
- 1640–1642: Francis Cottington, 1st Baron Cottington
- 1642–1644: Vacant
- 1644–1653: John Arthur
- 1653–1660: Vacant
- 1661–1672: Bullen Reymes
- 1672–1679: Vacant
- 1679–1699: Anthony Ashley-Cooper, Lord Ashley (Earl of Shaftesbury from 1683)
- 1699–1702: Anthony Ashley-Cooper, 3rd Earl of Shaftesbury
- 1702–1713: Thomas Strangways
- 1713–1714: Vacant
- 1714–1742: George Trenchard
- 1742–1754: Charles Powlett, 3rd Duke of Bolton
- 1754–1755: Vacant
- 1755–1759: Harry Powlett, 4th Duke of Bolton
- 1759–1765: Charles Powlett, Marquess of Winchester (Duke of Bolton from later in 1759)
- 1765–1767: Vacant
- 1767–1794: Harry Powlett, 6th Duke of Bolton
- 1794–1797: Vacant
- 1797–1800: George Paulet, 12th Marquess of Winchester
