= List of vice-admirals of Essex =

Vice Admiral of Essex
- Active: 1559-1835.
- Country: United Kingdom
- Branch: Royal Navy
- Type: Naval administration
- Role: Admiralty court and Naval Jurisdiction.

The Vice-Admiral of Essex was responsible for the defence of the county of Essex, England.

== History ==
As a vice-admiral, the post holder was the chief of naval administration for his district. His responsibilities included pressing men for naval service, deciding the lawfulness of prizes (captured by privateers), dealing with salvage claims for wrecks and acting as a judge.

The earliest record of an appointment was of Richard Cornwallis in 1558.

In 1863 the Registrar of the Admiralty Court stated that the offices had 'for many years been purely honorary' (HCA 50/24 pp. 235–6). Appointments were made by the Lord High Admiral when this officer existed. When the admiralty was in commission appointments were made by the crown by letters patent under the seal of the admiralty court.

== Vice-admirals of Essex ==
This is a list of people who have served as Vice-Admiral of Essex.

- Richard Cornwallis 1558–?
- Lewis David 1561–1575 jointly with
- Richard Wyche 1561–1575
- Thomas Ive 1576– jointly with
- William Ive 1577–?
- Philip Basset bef. 1580–1581
- Edward de Vere, 17th Earl of Oxford 1581–1582
- Clement Newce 1582–1584
- vacant
- Henry Bellingham 1585–1587 jointly with
- Thomas Writington 1586–1587
- vacant
- George Wood 1592–?
- Francis Burnell bef. 1593–1599
- Anthony Wingfield 1599–1609
- William Sammes 1609–1611
- vacant
- Robert Rich, 2nd Earl of Warwick 1620–1649
- English Interregnum
- Sir John Bramston 1661–1691
- Edward Cary 1691–1692 (MP for Colchester)
- Sir Isaac Rebow 1692–1702 (MP for Colchester)
- Sir Charles Barrington, 5th Baronet 1702–1705
- Richard Savage, 4th Earl Rivers 1705–1712
- Sir Charles Barrington, 5th Baronet 1712–1714
- Thomas Middleton 1714–1715 (MP for Essex)
- Robert Honywood 1715–1735 (MP for Essex)
- James Waldegrave, 1st Earl Waldegrave 1735–1741
- vacant
- William Nassau de Zuylestein, 4th Earl of Rochford 1748–1781
- vacant
- John Griffin, 4th Baron Howard de Walden 1795–1797
- Richard Griffin, 2nd Baron Braybrooke 1798–1825
- Henry Maynard, 3rd Viscount Maynard 1825–1865
- Thomas Trevor, 22nd Baron Dacre 1865–1869
