= Sixpenny Office =

British Admiralty office (1696–1832)

Office overview
- Formed: 1696
- Preceding Office: None
- Dissolved: 1832
- Superseding Office: None
- Jurisdiction: Government of the United Kingdom
- Headquarters: Admiralty London
- Office executives: First Commissioner and Receiver; Second Commissioner and Comptroller
- Parent department: Navy Office

The Sixpenny Office was one of the British admiralty's smaller offices. Established in 1696, it was originally based at Tower Hill, London. The office's main responsibility was the collection of six pence from all serving seaman's wage's monthly that was used to fund Greenwich Hospital's provision of care for sick and aged seaman.

The office was administered by navy board Commissioners for Managing the Sixpenny Duty for the Support of Greenwich Hospital until 1832, when it, along with the Navy Board, was abolished and its functions were dispersed between the members of the Board of Admiralty.

== History ==
The Sixpenny Office was originally established in 1692 during the reign of William and Mary of England. It was one of the admiralty's smaller offices and was responsible for collecting six pence from every serving seaman's wage monthly. The money was collected by duty receivers appointed to various ports around the country. The proceeds were then used to fund the Greenwich Hospital Department, which provided care for sick and aged seamen. Navy Board commissioners administered the office and processing of the funds received Navy Board commissioners. When the Navy Board was abolished in 1832, its former function of collecting duty towards securing a seaman's pension transferred to the Board of Admiralty.

== Head of office ==
Commissioners for Managing the Sixpenny Duty for the Support of Greenwich Hospital and Supporting Staff, Office at Tower-Hill. Incomplete list of post holders included:

=== First Commissioner and Receiver ===
1. 1814-1826, Benjamin Stowe
2. 1827-1832, Chas Kinsey

==== Second Commissioner and Comptroller ====
1. 1788-1820, John Beverley Esq
2. 1820-1826, Chas Kinsey
3. 1827-1832 G. B. Hamilton

== Supporting staff ==
=== Accountant ===
1. 1788, John Cleveland, MP for Barnstaple

=== First Clerk ===
1. 1820-1832, Charles Stanbridge

=== Receiver ===
1. 1788-1803 Thomas Hicks
2. 1803-1810, John Rashleigh

== Sources ==
1. Beaston, Robert (1788). A Political Index to the Histories of Great Britain and Ireland: Or, A Complete Register of the Hereditary Honours, Public Offices, and Persons in Office, from the Earliest Periods to the Present Time. London, Great Britain: G. G. J. & J. Robinson.
2. Hamilton, C. I. (February 2011). The Making of the Modern Admiralty: British Naval Policy-Making, 1805–1927. Cambridge, England: Cambridge University Press. ISBN 9781139496544.
3. Office, Admiralty (December 1814). The Navy List. London, England: John Murray.
4. Office, Admiralty (January 1820). The Navy List. London, England: John Murray.
5. Office, Admiralty (December 1827). The Navy List. London, England: W. Clowes.
6. The Parliamentary Debates from the Year 1803 to the Present Time. London, England: Hansard. 1812.
