= List of vice-admirals of Westmorland =

This is a list of people who have served as Vice-Admiral of Westmorland.

- Reginald Beseley 1559–? (also Vice-Admiral of Northumberland 1559–, Vice-Admiral of Durham 1559, Vice-Admiral of Cumberland 1559–1563 and Vice-Admiral of Yorkshire 1559-1563)
- Thomas Standeven 1563–?
- Sir Valentine Browne 1568–1574 (also Vice-Admiral of Northumberland 1563–1564 and 1568–1574 and Vice-Admiral of Durham 1568)
- Henry Carey, 1st Baron Hunsdon 1575 – aft. 1587 (also Vice-Admiral of Northumberland 1575–1596, Vice-Admiral of Durham 1575–1596 and Vice-Admiral of Cumberland 1586 – aft. 1587)
- Sir Robert Carey 1594–?
- Theophilus Howard, 2nd Earl of Suffolk 1622–1640 (also Vice-Admiral of Northumberland 1611-1640, Vice-Admiral of Durham 1611-1640 and Vice-Admiral of Cumberland 1611–1640)
- vacant
- John Moore 1644–1650
- vacant
- Charles Howard, 1st Earl of Carlisle 1661–1685 (also Vice-Admiral of Northumberland 1661-1685, Vice-Admiral of Durham 1661–1685, Vice-Admiral of Cumberland 1661-1685 and Vice-Admiral of Westmorland 1661-1685)
- John Lowther, 1st Viscount Lonsdale 1686–1700
- vacant
- Sir Richard Musgrave, 2nd Baronet 1702–1710
- Sir William Pennington, 1st Baronet 1710–1715
- Sir James Lowther, 4th Baronet 1715–1755
- vacant
- James Lowther, 1st Earl of Lonsdale 1765–1802
