= List of vice-admirals of Yorkshire =

This is a list of people who have served as Vice-Admiral of Yorkshire.

- Reginald Beseley 1559–1563 (also Vice-Admiral of Northumberland 1559–, Vice-Admiral of Cumberland 1559-1563 and Vice-Admiral of Durham 1559–1563 and Vice-Admiral of Westmorland 1559–?)
- William Eure, 2nd Baron Eure 1563–1564
- Thomas Awchon 1564–1565
- Anthony Bevercottes 1565–1569
- Sir Henry Gates 1569–1573 (MP for Yorkshire)
- Henry Clinton, Lord Clinton 1573–1578 (also Vice-Admiral of Lincolnshire bef. 1569 – aft. 1576)
- no incumbent 1578–1583
- Francis Cholmley 1583–1585
- William Howard 1585
- Sir John Stanhope 1585–1604
- Edmund Sheffield, 1st Earl of Mulgrave 1604–1646
- Edmund Sheffield, 2nd Earl of Mulgrave 1646–1651 (Parliamentary)
- Luke Robinson 1651–1652 (Parliamentary)
- Edmund Sheffield, 2nd Earl of Mulgrave 1652–1658 (Parliamentary)
- John Sheffield, 3rd Earl of Mulgrave 1659–1692 (also Vice-Admiral of Northumberland 1687–1689 and Vice-Admiral of Durham 1687–1689)
- Arthur Ingram, 3rd Viscount of Irvine 1692–1702
- Charles Boyle, 2nd Earl of Burlington 1702–1704
- Henry Boyle, 1st Baron Carleton 1704–1715
- Richard Boyle, 3rd Earl of Burlington 1715–1753
- vacant
- Charles Watson-Wentworth, 2nd Marquess of Rockingham 1755–1763
- Robert Darcy, 4th Earl of Holdernesse 1763–1776
- Charles Watson-Wentworth, 2nd Marquess of Rockingham 1776–1782
- vacant
- Francis Osborne, 5th Duke of Leeds 1795–1799
- vacant
- Henry Phipps, 1st Earl of Mulgrave 1809–1831
- vacant
- Albert Denison, 1st Baron Londesborough 1853–1860
