= List of vice-admirals of Northumberland =

This is a list of people who have served as Vice-Admiral of Northumberland.

- Reginald Beseley 1559–? (also Vice-Admiral of Yorkshire, 1559–1563, Vice-Admiral of Durham 1559–1563, Vice-Admiral of Cumberland 1559-1563 and Vice-Admiral of Westmorland 1559–?)
- William Grey, 13th Baron Grey de Wilton 1561–1562
- vacant
- Thomas Foster 1563 jointly with
- John Carvell 1563
- Valentine Browne 1563–1564
- Francis Russell, 2nd Earl of Bedford 1564–1566
- vacant
- Valentine Browne 1568–1574 (also Vice-Admiral of Durham 1568 and Vice-Admiral of Westmorland 1568–1574)
- Henry Carey, 1st Baron Hunsdon 1575–1596 (also Vice-Admiral of Durham 1575–1596, Vice-Admiral of Cumberland 1586 – aft. 1587 and Vice-Admiral of Westmorland 1575 – aft. 1587)
- Sir Richard Mompesson 1596–1604 (also Vice-Admiral of Durham 1596 and Vice-Admiral of Cumberland ?–1604 )
- Sir George Hume 1604–1611 (also Vice-Admiral of Cumberland 1604–1611)
- Theophilus Howard, 2nd Earl of Suffolk 1611–1640 (also Vice-Admiral of Durham 1611-1640, Vice-Admiral of Cumberland 1611-1640 and Vice-Admiral of Westmorland 1622–1640)
- Sir John Delaval 1640–1641 (also Vice-Admiral of Durham 1640)
- vacant
- Charles Howard, 1st Earl of Carlisle 1661–1685 (also Vice-Admiral of Durham 1661-1685, Vice-Admiral of Cumberland 1661-1685 and Vice-Admiral of Westmorland 1661-1685)
- vacant
- John Sheffield, 3rd Earl of Mulgrave 1687–1689 (also Vice-Admiral of Durham 1687–1689 and Vice-Admiral of Yorkshire 1659–1692)
- Richard Lumley, 1st Earl of Scarbrough 1689–1703 (also Vice-Admiral of Durham 1689–1702)
- Mark Shafto 1703–1709
- Sir John Delaval, 3rd Baronet 1709–1729
- vacant
- Hugh Percy, 1st Duke of Northumberland 1755–1786
- Hugh Percy, 2nd Duke of Northumberland 1786–1817
- vacant
- Hugh Percy, 3rd Duke of Northumberland 1822–1847
