= List of vice-admirals of Sussex =

This is a list of people who have served as Vice-Admiral of Sussex.

- Sir William More 1559–1600
- vacant
- Charles Howard, 2nd Earl of Nottingham 1608–1642
- Francis Lennard, 14th Baron Dacre bef. 1647–1650
- Anthony Stapley 1651–1655 (Parliamentary)
- vacant
- Sir John Pelham, 3rd Baronet 1660–1703
- Charles Goring 1703–1705
- Thomas Pelham, 1st Baron Pelham 1705–1712
- John Ashburnham, 3rd Baron Ashburnham 1712–1715
- Thomas Pelham-Holles, 1st Duke of Newcastle 1715–1768
- vacant
- John Ashburnham, 2nd Earl of Ashburnham 1770–1812
- Charles Lennox, 4th Duke of Richmond 1812–1819
- George Wyndham, 3rd Earl of Egremont 1820–1831
- Charles Gordon-Lennox, 5th Duke of Richmond 1831–1860
