= List of vice-admirals of Somerset =

This is a list of people who have served as Vice-Admiral of Somerset.

- Sir William Wynter bef. 1561 – 1589
- Edward Wynter 1589 – aft. 1605
- Sir Edward Rodney 1625–1642
- English Interregnum
- vacant
- Francis Luttrell 1685–1690
- Sir Edward Phelips 1690–1697
- Henry Henley 1697–1702
- Sir Francis Warre, 1st Baronet 1702–1709
- Sir William Wyndham, 3rd Baronet 1709–1715
- George Dodington 1715–1720
- George Dodington, 1st Baron Melcombe 1720–1762
- vacant
- John Perceval, 2nd Earl of Egmont 1766–1770
- vacant
- Edward St Maur, 11th Duke of Somerset 1831–1855
