= List of vice-admirals of Lincolnshire =

This is a list of people who have served as Vice-Admiral of Lincolnshire.

- Robert Dymoke in 1565
- Henry Clinton, Lord Clinton bef. 1569 – aft. 1576 (also Vice-Admiral of Yorkshire, 1578–1583)
- Sir Edmund Carey 1585 – aft. 1587
- vacant
- Sir Clement Cotterell 1620–1631
- Robert Bertie, 1st Earl of Lindsey 1631–1642
- vacant
- Edward Ayscough 1647–1649 (Parliamentary)
- vacant
- Sir Henry Vane 1651–1660 (Parliamentary)
- George Saunderson, 5th Viscount Castleton 1660–1702
- Thomas Saunderson 1702–1705
- James Saunderson, 1st Earl Castleton 1705–1723
- vacant
- John Cust, 1st Earl Brownlow 1809–1853
- Charles Anderson-Pelham, 2nd Earl of Yarborough 1854–1862
- Charles Pelham, 4th Earl of Yarborough 1883–1936?
