= Richard Mompesson =

Member of the Parliament of England (died 1627)

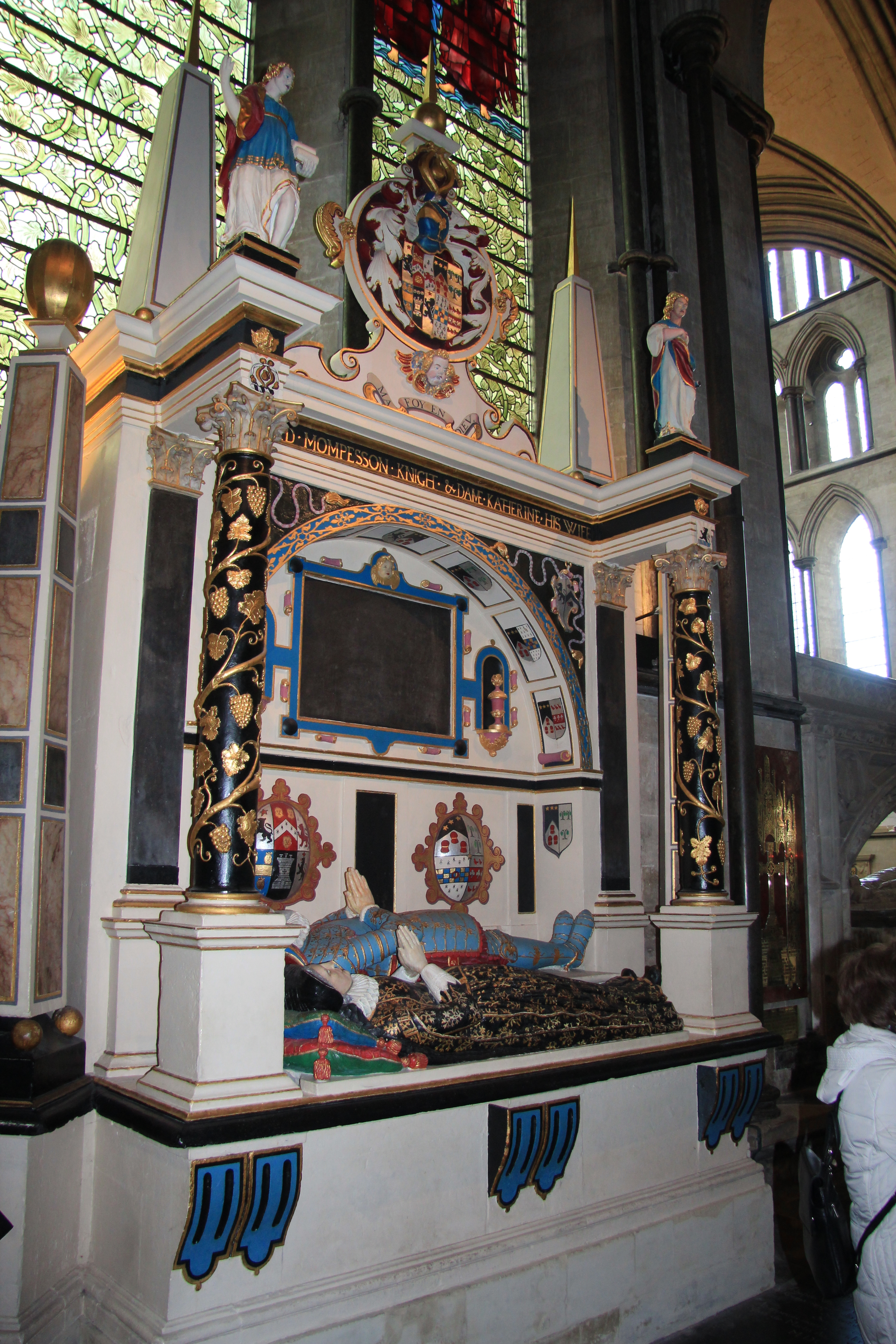
Monument to Sir Richard Mompesson and his third wife Katherine, Salisbury Cathedral

Sir Richard Mompesson (died 1627) was a member (MP) of the Parliament of England for Devizes in 1593.

His father was William Mompesson of Maiden Bradley, Wiltshire. From c. 1574 he was esquire of the royal stables. Mompesson married three times, first c. 1587 to Mary, widow of Edward Sutton, 4th Baron Dudley but born Mary Howard, daughter of William 1st Baron of Effingham and Margaret Gamage.

Mompessom was knighted in 1603 for minor services to James I but received no further advancement. He retired first to West Harnham, Salisbury, and then to that city's Cathedral Close, where he largely rebuilt the house later known as Arundells. (Elsewhere in the Close a descendant, Sir Thomas Mompesson, built Mompesson House, completed in the early 18th century.)

His splendid monument with effigies survives in Salisbury Cathedral.
