= Reginald Beseley =

English Member of Parliament

Member of the England Parliament for York
- In office 1555–1558
- Preceded by: William Holme; William Coupland
- Succeeded by: William Holme; Robert Paycock

Personal details
- Born: 1509
- Died: 1562 (aged 52–53)
- Spouse: Alice

Reginald Beseley

Member of the England Parliament for Scarborough
- In office 1545–1547
- Preceded by: Sir Ralph Eure; Sir Nicholas Fairfax
- Succeeded by: Richard Whalley
- In office 1547–1552
- Preceded by: Richard Whalley
- Succeeded by: Thomas Eyns; General Dakins
- In office 1554–1555
- Preceded by: Anthony Browne; Robert Massey
- Succeeded by: William Hasye; Francis Aislabie

Reginald Beseley

Member of the England Parliament for Thirsk
- In office 1553 (March) – 1553 (October)
- Preceded by: Sir William Cavendish; Robert Flint (MP)
- Succeeded by: Thomas Eynnes; John Gascoigne
- In office 1554 (April) – 1554 (November)
- Preceded by: Thomas Eynnes; John Gascoigne
- Succeeded by: Christopher Lascelles; Edward Beseley

Reginald Beseley

Member of the England Parliament for Knaresborough
- In office 1553 (October) – 1554 (April)
- Succeeded by: Edward Napper; John Long

Reginald Beseley was one of two Members of the Parliament of England for the borough of Scarborough in 1545, 1547, the November session of 1554 and in 1559. He also represented the borough of Thirsk in the March session of 1553 and the April session of 1554, as well as the borough of Knaresborough in the October session of 1553 and also the constituency of York in 1555.

== Life and politics ==
There is little recorded about Reginald's early life. He is noted as being a tenant on lands belonging to Furness Abbey in 1530 and a number of letters verify his profession as a lawyer in 1533, 1534 and 1548. He held several offices across the county of Yorkshire during his lifetime. Most notably those of recorder for Scarborough in 1547; treasurer to Admiral Seymour in 1547; Vice -Admiral in the North, also in 1547 and 1548; clerk of the court and castle of York in 1555. His numerous terms as MP for several constituencies is reported to have been due to the support of Francis Talbot, 5th Earl of Shrewsbury, who was president of the Council of the North at the time.

He married Alice and had one son and two daughters, Agnes and Anne.
