= Military administration =

Management of a military

Military administration identifies both the techniques and systems used by military departments, agencies, and armed services involved in managing the armed forces. It describes the processes that take place within military organisations outside combat, particularly in managing military personnel, their training, and services they are provided with as part of their military service.

In cases of military government, for example during a military occupation, the management and control of civilians, and provision of services to them, may also be in scope.

In many ways military administration serves the same role as public administration in the civil society, and is often cited as a source of bureaucracy in the government as a whole. Given the wide area of application, military administration is often qualified by specific areas of application within the military, such as logistics administration, administration of doctrine development or military reform administration.

== History ==
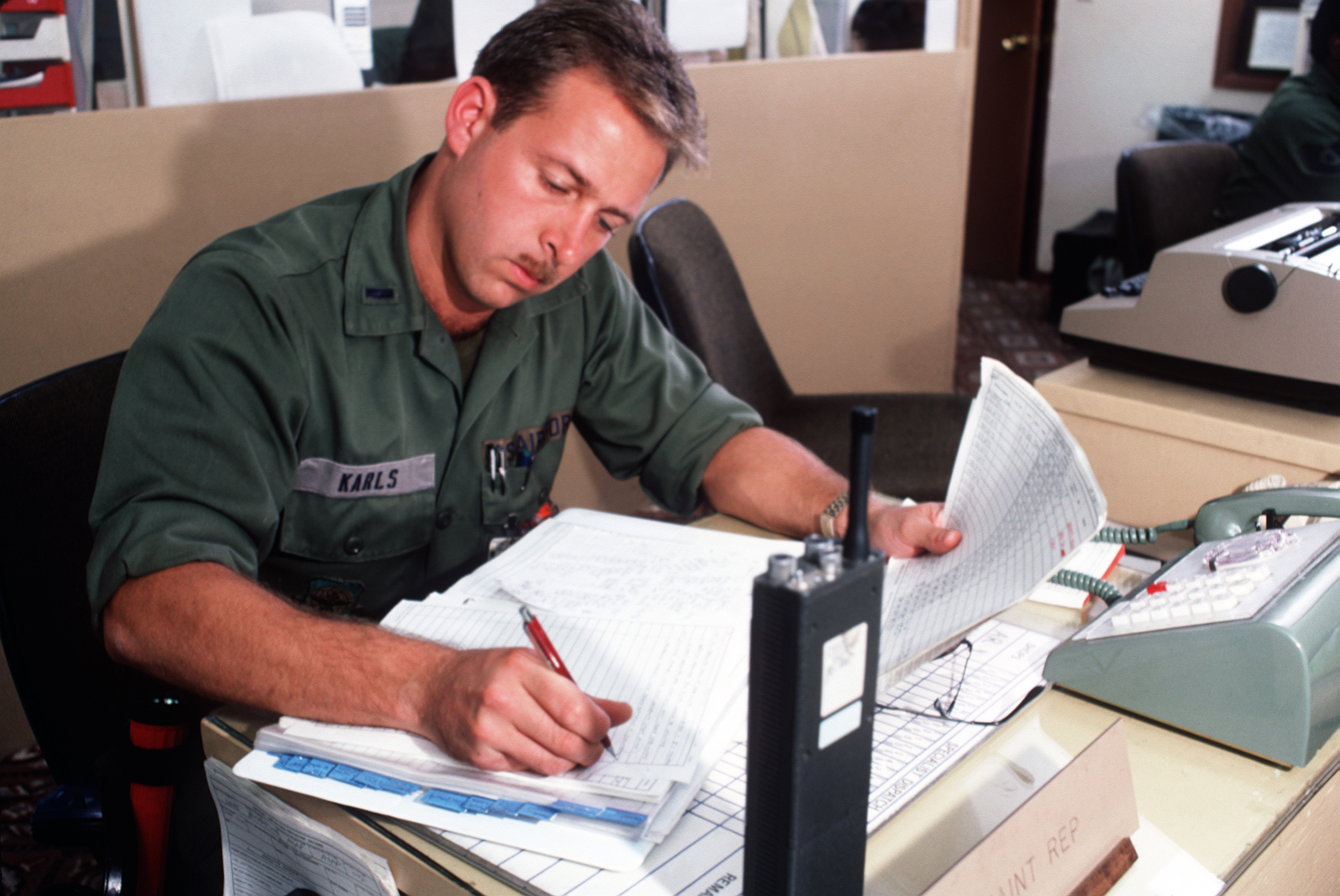
US 1st Lieutenant Christopher D. Karls, 63rd Military Air Wing (MAW), completes paperwork in the Military Airlift Command airlift control element facility during a war game simulation (1989).

The development of military administration reflects broader changes in state formation, bureaucratic organisation, and the professionalisation of armed forces.

In pre-modern societies, military administration was often informal and closely tied to personal rule, feudal obligation, or temporary mobilisation. Logistics, recruitment, and finance were managed through informal arrangements rather than standing institutions. Classical empires such as the Roman Empire developed more systematic administrative structures to support large, permanent forces, including standardised pay systems, supply chains, and record-keeping whose administrative capacity was a key factor in sustaining imperial military power.

From the early modern period onwards, the growth of centralised states in Europe transformed military administration into a more formalised and bureaucratic system. The emergence of standing armies required permanent institutions for recruitment, training, procurement, and finance. Developments in taxation and public accounting were closely linked to military needs, reinforcing what scholars describe as the “fiscal-military state”.

By the 19th century, industrialisation further reshaped military administration, introducing standardised procedures, professional officer corps, staff systems, and increasingly complex logistical networks. The Prussian General Staff model became influential in structuring operational planning and administrative coordination, illustrating the integration of expertise into military governance.

In the 20th and 21st centuries, military administration has expanded beyond traditional personnel and logistics functions to include large-scale civilian oversight, defence procurement systems, legal frameworks, and interagency coordination. The rise of total war in the World Wars and global tensions throughout the Cold War significantly enlarged administrative structures, embedding military institutions within broader national bureaucracies.

Post–Cold War reforms in many states have emphasised efficiency, accountability, and civilian control, often drawing on public administration theory and management practices. Contemporary military administration increasingly addresses cyber operations, multinational coalition coordination, and complex global supply chains, reflecting both technological change and evolving security environments. Overall, military administration has shifted from localised and personalised arrangements to highly institutionalised, professionalised, and interdependent systems embedded within modern states.
