= Admiralty court =

Courts with maritime jurisdiction

Admiralty courts, also known as maritime courts, are courts exercising jurisdiction over all maritime contracts, torts, injuries, and offenses.

== United Kingdom ==
=== Scotland ===
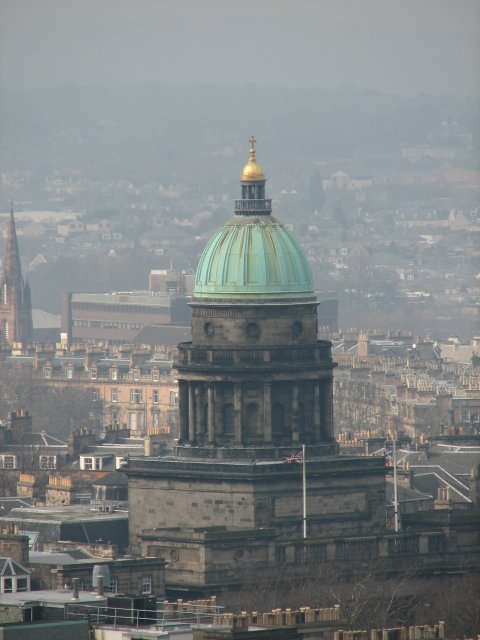
Edinburgh's West Register House houses the records of the Scottish Admiralty Court.

The Scottish court's earliest records, held in West Register House in Edinburgh, indicate that sittings were a regular event by at least 1556. Judges were styled "Judge Admiral" and received appointment at the hands of the Scottish High Admiral (Note: Other than a brief interregnum from 1689 to 1702, during which the position of Admiral was suspended and its functions administered by a board of commissioners.) to hear matters affecting the Royal Scots Navy as well as mercantile, privateering and prize money disputes. From 1702 the judge of the court was also authorised to appoint deputies to hear lesser matters or to deputise during his absence.

The Scottish court's workload was small until the mid-eighteenth century, with judges hearing no more than four matters in each sitting. After the 1750s the volume of cases rose until by 1790 it was necessary to maintain a daily log of decisions. The growth in caseload was related to increasing disputes regarding breaches of charter, including ship's masters seeking compensation for unpaid freight and merchants suing for damage to goods or unexpected port fees. Cases reflected Scotland's principal marine industries including the transshipment of sugar and tobacco and the export of dried fish, coal and grains. A smaller number of cases related to smuggling, principally brandy, and to salvage rights for ships wrecked on Scottish shores. The court ceased operation in 1832 and its functions were subsumed into the Court of Session, Scotland's supreme court for civil disputes.

=== Cinque Ports ===
The sole survivor of the independent courts of admiralty is the Court of Admiralty for the Cinque Ports, which is presided over by the early-merged role of Judge Official and Commissary. This office is normally held by a High Court Judge who holds the appointment of Admiralty Judge. The jurisdiction of the Court of Admiralty of the Cinque Ports extends in an area with boundaries running from the Naze Tower, Essex along the shore to Brightlingsea, then to Shoe Beacon (or Shore Beacon), (to the east of Shoeburyness, Essex), across the mouth of the Thames Estuary to Shellness, Kent, and around the coast to Redcliffe, near Seaford, Sussex. It covers all the sea from Seaford to a point five miles off Cape Grisnez on the coast of France, and the Galloper Sands off the coast of Essex. The last full sitting was in 1914. According to general civilian practice, the registrar can (and here does) act as deputy to the judge. Unless the judge finds a conflict of interest in the registrar's work their main task is to co-invest each successive Lord Warden of the Cinque Ports. Appeal from the court's decisions lies to the Judicial Committee of the Privy Council.

Judge Official and Commissary of the Court of Admiralty of the Cinque Ports
In office	Name	Qualifications
1791–1809	French Laurence	Doctor of Civil Law
1809–1855	Sir Joseph Phillimore	Doctor of Civil Law
1855–1875	Rt Hon Sir Robert Phillimore	Bachelor of Arts, Doctor of Civil Law, Queen's Counsel, Privy Councillor, Barrister-at-Law
1914–1936	Rt Hon Sir Frederick Pollock	Barrister-at-Law, Fellow of the British Academy, Queen's Counsel, Privy Councillor
1936–1961	R. E. Knocker	Order of the British Empire
1961–1967	N. L. C. Macaskie	Queen's Counsel
1967–1979	Sir Henry Barnard	Barrister-at-Law, Queen's Counsel
1979–1996	Lieutenant-Commander Gerald Darling	MA (Oxon), Deputy Lieutenant, Barrister-at-Law, Queen's Counsel
1996-2021	Lord Clarke of Stone-cum-Ebony	Justice of the Supreme Court of the United Kingdom, Queens’s counsel
2021- present	Sir Nigel Teare|	MA (Oxon), Queen's Counsel, High Court judge

=== Court regalia ===
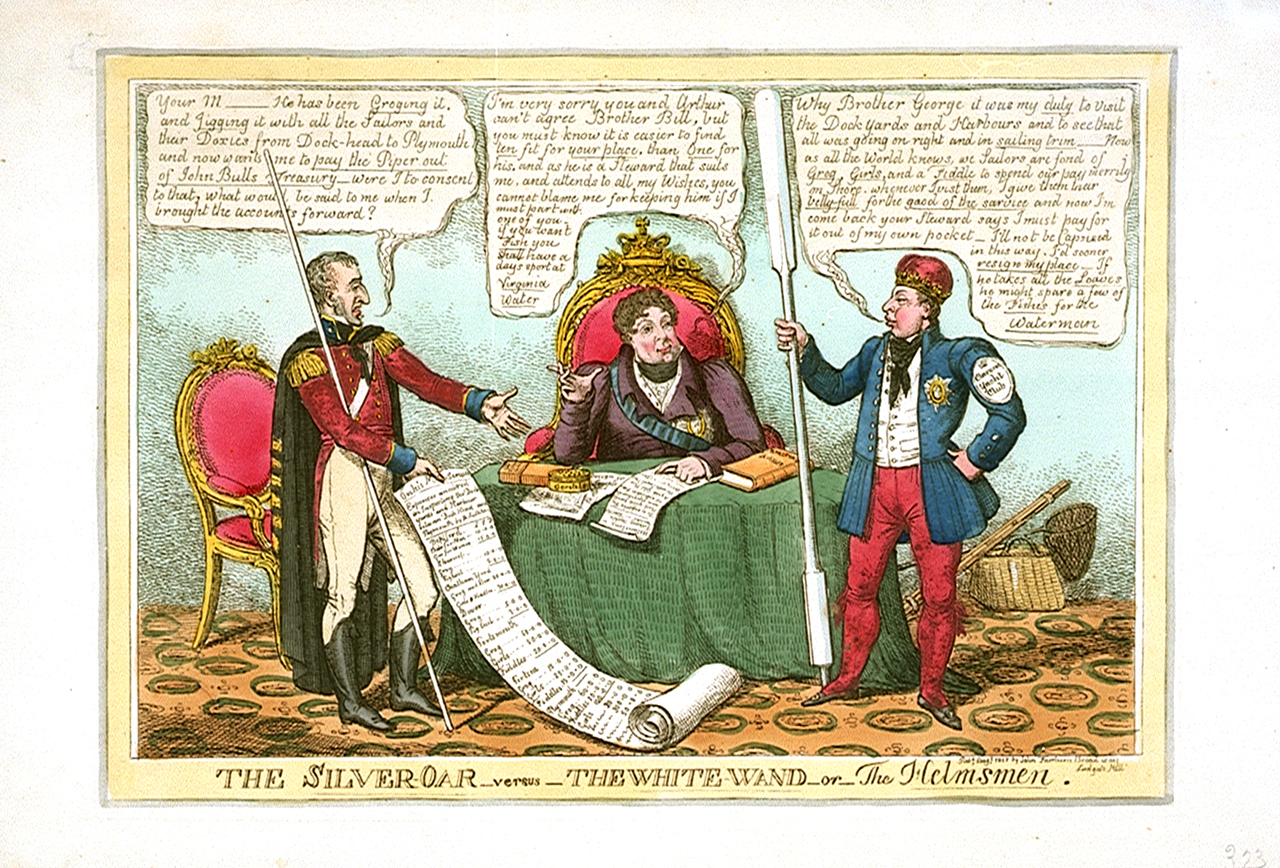
Cartoon showing the Duke of Wellington; King George IV and George's brother William holding the Silver Oar of the Admiralty

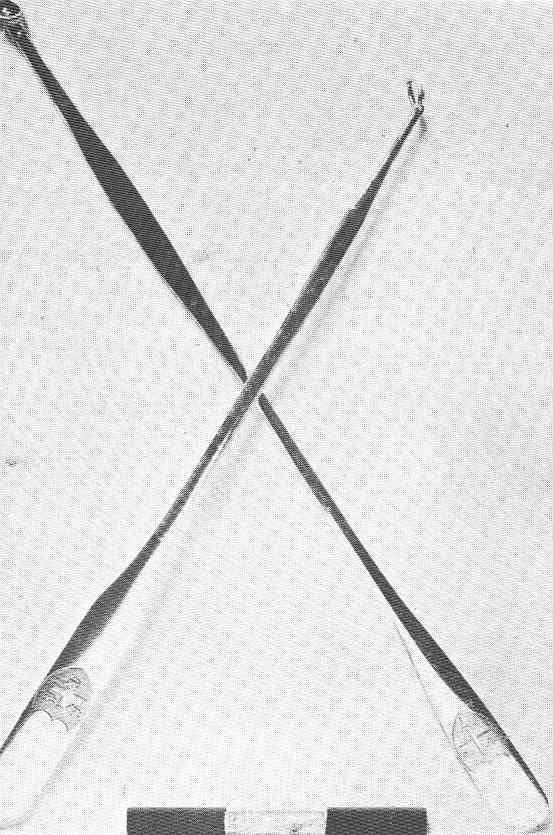
Silver Oars—Insignia of Office of the Water Baliffs of Colchester

Since Elizabethan times, the symbol of authority for a British admiralty court has been a silver oar, placed before the judge when the court is in session. In this respect the silver oar is the equivalent of a ceremonial mace, representing the authority of the Crown and the Lord High Admiral of the United Kingdom. An antique silver oar is still placed before the bench when the High Court sits in London on matters relating to its admiralty court functions; in past times it was borne by the marshal in procession, not only in court but on occasions of arrest of persons or vessels, and also on the way to Execution Dock for the last journey of those convicted of piracy. The date of the London oar is uncertain: it is depicted on the tomb of David Lewis, Judge of the High Court of Admiralty from 1559 until 1584, there is some evidence that it may date from the beginnings of the court in the fourteenth century, though one of several assay marks suggests that it was remade three centuries later (based on the earlier pattern). Local courts and vice-admiralty courts had their own silver oars; early examples survive from colonial courts in Bermuda (1701), Boston (1725), New York City (c. 1725), Colombo (1801), Cape of Good Hope (1806) and Calcutta. The silver oars measure four feet in length, and are borne by a ceremonial Water Bailiff, who is charged with the protection of the magistrate while the latter is on duty near the water.

The Admiralty Court of the Cinque Ports had a silver oar of early date, but it was stolen in the 1960s and replaced with a replica. Some local authorities possess examples relating to their former local admiralty jurisdiction. In recent times, new silver oars have been made for admiralty courts in Canada, Australia and New Zealand; in 2014 the Admiralty Court presented a replica silver oar mace to the Corporation of Trinity House on the occasion of its 500th anniversary, acknowledging the work of its brethren in advising the court over much of its history.

In addition to representing the court in session, from the nineteenth century the silver oar has been the insignia of the Admiralty Marshal – an official responsible for serving writs of the court, and carrying out the sale of any vessels seized and disposed of by court decision.

=== Vice admiralty courts ===
Vice Admiralty Courts Act 1863 (Note: Section 1.)
- Act of Parliament
- Parliament of the United Kingdom
- Long title: An Act to facilitate the Appointment of Vice Admirals and of Officers in Vice Admiralty Courts in Her Majesty's Possessions abroad, and to confirm the past Proceedings, to extend the Jurisdiction, and to amend the Practice of those Courts.
- Citation: 26 & 27 Vict. c. 24
- Territorial extent: United Kingdom

Dates
- Royal assent: 8 June 1863
- Commencement: 8 June 1863 (Note: The Acts of Parliament (Commencement) Act 1793.)
- Repealed: 1 July 1891
Other legislation
Amends	Vice-Admiralty Courts Act 1816; Slave Trade Act 1824; Vice-Admiralty Courts Act 1832; Judicial Committee Act 1843
Repeals/revokes	Validity of Certain Proceedings, etc. Act 1854
Repealed by	Colonial Courts of Admiralty Act 1890

Status: Repealed

Text of statute as originally enacted

To expedite the administration of maritime law, British colonies were routinely granted subsidiary jurisdiction through independent vice-admiralty courts. These were civil courts with the power to interpret colonial legislation, provided these did not conflict with Admiralty Court decisions or British maritime law.

The first vice-admiralty court in Australia was established in the colony of New South Wales in 1788. The first Vice-Admiral was Arthur Phillip and the first judge was Robert Ross. The court was abolished in 1911 when the Supreme Court of New South Wales was granted the admiralty jurisdiction of the court.

A vice-admiralty court was also formed in Nova Scotia to try smugglers and to enforce the Sugar Act 1764 throughout British North America. From 1763 to 1765, when American smugglers were caught, they were tried by corrupt judges who received a percentage of the confiscated goods if the defendants were found guilty; therefore, defendants were more than likely to be found guilty.

=== Colonial courts of admiralty ===
Colonial Courts of Admiralty Act 1890 (Note: Section 1.)
- Act of Parliament
- Parliament of the United Kingdom
- Long title: An Act to amend the Law respecting the exercise of Admiralty Jurisdiction in Her Majesty's Dominions and elsewhere out of the United Kingdom.
- Citation: 53 & 54 Vict. c. 27
- Territorial extent: United Kingdom

Dates
- Royal assent: 25 July 1890
- Commencement: 1 July 1891 (Note: Section 16.)
Other legislation
Amends	Judicial Committee Act 1833; Judicial Committee Act 1843; Judicial Committee Act 1844; Slave Trade (East African Courts) Act 1873; Slave Trade Act 1873; Pacific Islanders Protection Act 1875
Repeals/revokes	Vice-Admiralty Courts Act 1816; Vice-Admiralty Courts Act 1832; Vice-Admiralty Courts Act 1863; Vice-Admiralty Courts Act Amendment Act 1867
Amended by	Government of India (Adaptation of Acts of Parliament) Order 1937; Burma Independence Act 1947; Statute Law (Repeals) Act 1976; Statute Law (Repeals) Act 1986; Statute Law (Repeals) Act 1998

Status: Amended

Text of statute as originally enacted

Revised text of statute as amended

Text of the Colonial Courts of Admiralty Act 1890 as in force today (including any amendments) within the United Kingdom, from legislation.gov.uk.

Local courts and vice-admiralty courts had their own silver oars as symbols of Admiralty jurisdiction; early examples survive from colonial courts in Bermuda (1701), Boston (1725), New York City (c. 1725), Colombo (1801), Cape of Good Hope (1806) and Calcutta.

1890 saw the enactment of the Colonial Courts of Admiralty Act 1890 (53 & 54 Vict. c. 27). That act provided for the abolition of the imperial courts of admiralty and replace them with local courts to be called colonial courts of admiralty. It was widely considered unsatisfactory that the imperial court should exist separately to the colonial courts, yet use the same facilities and personnel of the colonial courts.

== Ceylon and Sri Lanka ==
A colonial court of admiralty was established in the British Ceylon in 1891 under the Ceylon Courts of Admiralty Ordinance under the provisions of the Colonial Courts of Admiralty Act 1890 (UK) to deal jurisdiction over all admiralty and maritime actions. With Ceylon gaining self rule in 1948, jurisdiction over admiralty matters were transferred to the Supreme Court of Ceylon as the Ceylon Independence Act 1947 (UK) made provisions of the Admiralty Act inapplicable.

In Sri Lanka today, admiralty jurisdiction is exercised by the High Court of Colombo, having had the jurisdiction transferred to it from the Supreme Court under the provisions of the Judicature Act No.2 of 1978.

== Canada ==
A silver oar sat in Quebec City, for many years from 1764 the seat of Admiralty practice in the St Lawrence Great Lakes drainage basin. The Halifax vice Admiralty court sat in judgment of the bulk of the piracy cases in the western Atlantic, while Quebec dealt with most of the commercial work.

The Canadian Admiralty court was born the year after the Colonial Courts of Admiralty Act 1890 laid the groundwork. In that year "the Parliament of Canada declared the Exchequer Court of Canada to be a "Colonial Court of Admiralty", thereby rendering it Canada's national admiralty court. The Exchequer Court continued in this role until 1 June 1971, when it was renamed and continued by statute as the Federal Court of Canada, to remain the admiralty court of Canada."

== Hanseatic League ==
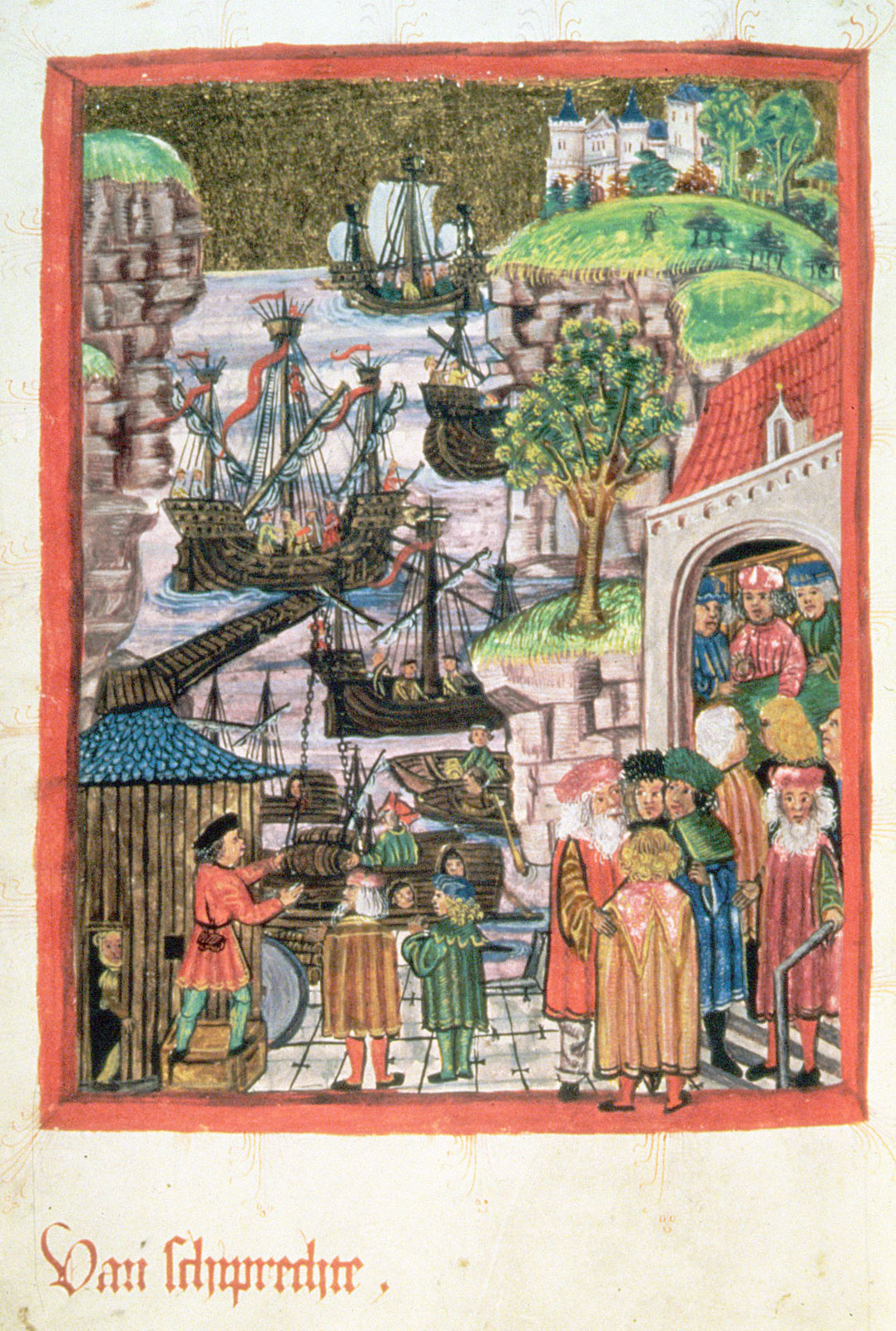
Foundation of the alliance between Lübeck and Hamburg in the part about ship law (Van schiprechte) in the Hamburg city right from 1497

The Hanseatic League was formed in the 13th century to exploit trade between Nordic cities linked by the Baltic Sea. The law van schiprechte was developed by this means. In 1241, Lübeck, which had access to the Baltic and North seas' fishing grounds, formed an alliance—a precursor to the League—with the trade city of Hamburg, which controlled access to the salt-trade routes from Lüneburg. These cities gained control over most of the salt-fish trade, especially the Scania Market; Cologne joined them in the Diet of 1260. The towns raised their armies, with each guild required to provide levies when needed. The Hanseatic cities aided one another, and commercial ships often served to carry soldiers and their arms. The network of alliances grew to include a flexible roster of 70 to 170 cities.

The Thirty Years' War, from 1618 to 1648, was destructive for the Hanseatic League and members suffered heavily. Then in 1666, the Steelyard burned in the Great Fire of London. The Kontor-manager sent a letter to Lübeck appealing for immediate financial assistance for a reconstruction. Hamburg, Bremen, and Lübeck called for a Hanseatic Day in 1669. Only a few cities participated and those who came were reluctant to contribute financially to the London reconstruction. It was the last formal meeting, unbeknownst to any of the parties.

== United States ==
In the United States, the federal district courts have jurisdiction over all admiralty and maritime actions; see 28 U.S.C. § 1333.

In recent years, a pseudolegal conspiracy argument used notably by sovereign citizens is that an American court displaying an American flag with a gold fringe is in fact an "admiralty court" and thus has no jurisdiction. Courts have repeatedly dismissed this as frivolous. In United States v. Greenstreet, the court summarized their finding to this argument with, "Unfortunately for Defendant Greenstreet, decor is not a determinant for jurisdiction."

== Bibliography ==
- Meeson, Nigel; Kimbell, John (2011). Admiralty Jurisdiction and Practice (4th ed.). London: Informa Law & Finance. ISBN 9781843119432.
- Mowat, Susan (1997). "Shipping and Trade in Scotland 1556-1830". The Mariner's Mirror. 83 (1): 14–20. doi:10.1080/00253359.1997.10656626.
- Sainty, J.C. (1975). Office-holders in Modern Britain: Admiralty Officials 1660-1870. London: Athlone Press. ISBN 0485171449.
- Wiswall, F. L. (1970). The Development of Admiralty Jurisdiction and Practice Since 1800. Cambridge University Press. ISBN 0521077516.
