= Maritime history =

Study of human activity at sea

Magic and Gracie off Castle Garden, painted by James E. Buttersworth, c. 1871

Maritime history is the study of human interaction with and activity at sea. It covers a broad thematic element of history that often uses a global approach, although national and regional histories remain predominant. As an academic subject, it often crosses the boundaries of standard disciplines, focusing on understanding humankind's various relationships to the oceans, seas, and major waterways of the globe. Nautical history records and interprets past events involving ships, shipping, navigation, and seafarers.

Maritime history is the broad overarching subject that includes fishing, whaling, international maritime law, naval history, the history of ships, ship design, shipbuilding, the history of navigation, the history of the various maritime-related sciences (oceanography, cartography, hydrography, etc.), sea exploration, maritime economics and trade, shipping, yachting, seaside resorts, the history of lighthouses and aids to navigation, maritime themes in literature, maritime themes in art, the social history of sailors and passengers and sea-related communities. There are a number of approaches to the field, sometimes divided into two broad categories: Traditionalists, who seek to engage a small audience of other academics, and Utilitarians, who seek to influence policy makers and a wider audience.

== Historiography ==
Historians from many lands have published monographs, popular and scholarly articles, and collections of archival resources. A leading journal is International Journal of Maritime History, a fully refereed scholarly journal published twice a year by the International Maritime Economic History Association. Based in Canada with an international editorial board, it explores the maritime dimensions of economic, social, cultural, and environmental history. For a broad overview, see the four-volume encyclopedia edited by John B. Hattendorf, Oxford Encyclopedia of Maritime History (Oxford, 2007). It contains over 900 articles by 400 scholars and runs 2900 pages. Other major reference resources are Spencer Tucker, ed., Naval Warfare: An International Encyclopedia (3 vol. ABC-CLIO, 2002) with 1500 articles in 1231, pages, and I. C. B. Dear and Peter Kemp, eds., Oxford Companion to Ships and the Sea (2nd ed. 2005) with 2600 articles in 688 pages.

Typically, studies of merchant shipping and of defensive navies are seen as separate fields. Inland waterways are included within 'maritime history,' especially inland seas such as the Great Lakes of North America, and major navigable rivers and canals worldwide.

One approach to maritime history writing has been nicknamed 'rivet counting' because of a focus on the minutiae of the vessel. However, revisionist scholars are creating new turns in the study of maritime history. This includes a post-1980s turn towards the study of human users of ships (which involves sociology, cultural geography, gender studies and narrative studies); and post-2000 turn towards seeing sea travel as part of the wider history of transport and mobilities. This move is sometimes associated with Marcus Rediker and Black Atlantic studies, but most recently has emerged from the International Association for the History of Transport, Traffic and Mobilities (T2M).

Building on earlier efforts to bring the ocean itself, rather than merely maritime activity at the surface, into historical analysis, Michael W. Jung has proposed the concept of Sub-Oceanic History. The approach shifts attention from the sea surface to the ocean's interior as a historically produced and technologically mediated space. It connects histories of diving and underwater exploration with the history of knowledge, science and technology, and infrastructure, and examines how changing forms of underwater access - from freediving and scuba diving to saturation systems, submersibles, and remotely operated vehicles - have transformed the ocean interior into a space that can increasingly be accessed, known, and controlled. Jung frames this relationship through the analytical triad of access, knowledge, and control and positions Sub-Oceanic History at the intersection of maritime history, environmental history, and Science and Technology Studies (STS).

See also: Historiography related articles below

== Prehistoric times ==
Watercraft such as rafts and boats have been used far into pre-historic times and possibly even by Homo erectus more than a million years ago crossing straits between landmasses.

Little evidence remains that would pinpoint when the first seafarer made their journey. It is known, for instance, that a sea voyage had to have been made to reach Greater Australia (Sahul) c. 50,000 or more years ago. Functional maritime technology was required to progress between the many islands of Wallacea before making this crossing. It is unknown what seafaring predated the milestone of the first settling of Australia. One of the oldest known boats to be found is the Pesse canoe, and carbon dating has estimated its construction from 8040 to 7510 BCE. The Pesse canoe is the oldest physical object that can date the use of watercraft, but the oldest depiction of a watercraft is from Norway. The rock art in Valle Municipality in Norway depicts a carving of a more than 4 meter long boat and it is dated to be 10,000 to 11,000 years old.

== Ancient times ==
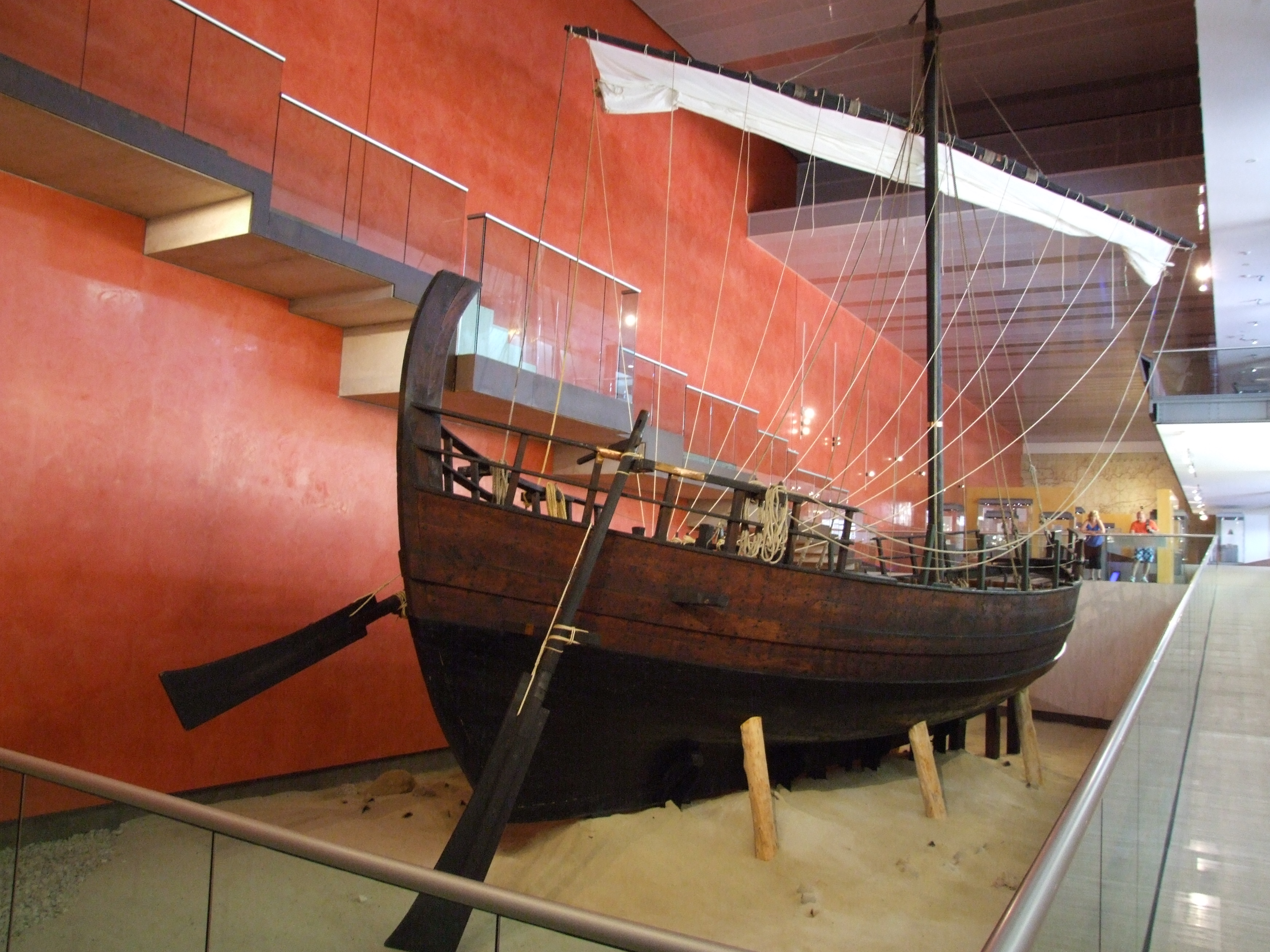
A replica of the Kyrenia ship, a 4th-century BCE Greek merchant ship

Throughout history sailing has been instrumental in the development of civilization, affording humanity greater mobility than travel over land, whether for trade, transport or warfare, and the capacity for fishing. The earliest depiction of a maritime sailing vessel is from the Ubaid period of Mesopotamia in the Persian Gulf, from around 3500 to 3000 BCE. These vessels were depicted in clay models and painted disks. They were made from bundled reeds encased in a lattice of ropes. Remains of barnacle-encrusted bituminous amalgams have also been recovered, which are interpreted to have been part of the water-proof coating applied on these vessels. The depictions lack details, but an image of a vessel on a shard of pottery shows evidence of what could be bipod masts and a sail, which would make it the earliest known evidence of the use of such technology. The location of the sites indicate that the Ubaid culture was engaging in maritime trade with Neolithic Arabian cultures along the coasts of the Persian Gulf for high-value goods. Pictorial representation of sails are also known from Ancient Egypt, dated to circa 3100 BCE. The earliest seaborne trading route, however, is known from the 7th millennium BCE in the Aegean Sea. It involved the seaborne movement of obsidian by an unknown Neolithic Europe seafaring people. The obsidian was mined from the volcanic island of Milos and then transported to various parts of the Balkans, Anatolia, and Cyprus, where they were refined into obsidian blades. However, the nature of the seafaring technologies involved have not been preserved.

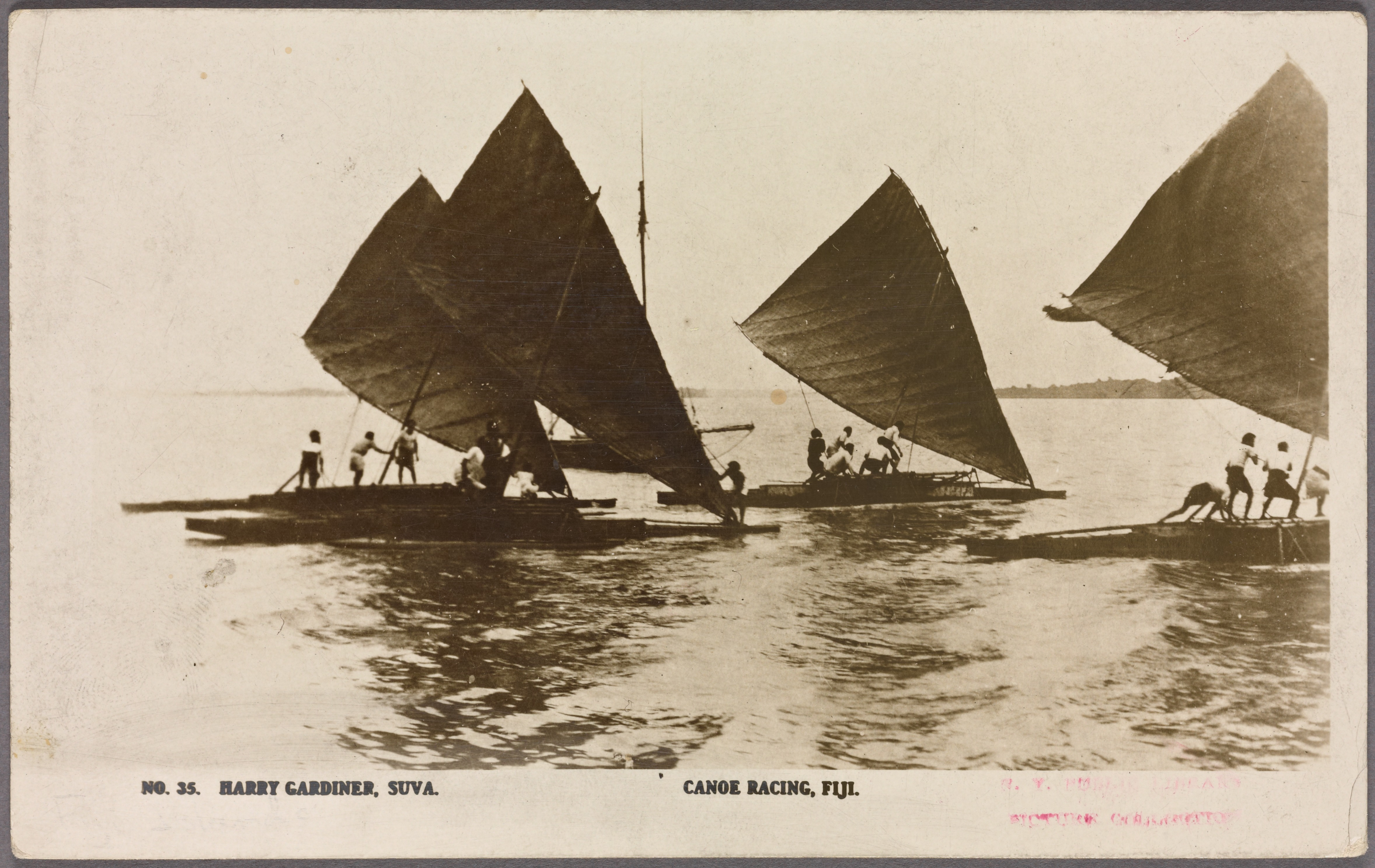
Traditional Austronesian craft being raced, Fiji

Austronesians started a dispersal from Taiwan across Maritime Southeast Asia around 3000 BCE. This started to spread into the islands of the Pacific c. 1300 BCE, steadily advanced across the Pacific and culminated with the settlement of Hawaii c. 1250 CE, and New Zealand c. 1300 CE. Distinctive maritime technology was used for this, including the lashed-lug boatbuilding technique, the catamaran, and the crab claw sail, together with extensive navigation techniques. This allowed them to colonize a large part of the Indo-Pacific region during the Austronesian expansion. Prior to the 16th century Colonial Era, Austronesians were the most widespread ethnolinguistic group, spanning half the planet from Easter Island in the eastern Pacific Ocean to Madagascar in the western Indian Ocean.

The Ancient Egyptians had knowledge of sail construction. The Greek historian Herodotus states that Necho II sent out an expedition of Phoenicians, which in two and a half years sailed from the Red Sea around Africa to the mouth of the Nile. As they sailed south and then west, they observed that the mid-day sun was to the north. Their contemporaries did not believe them, but modern historians take this as evidence that they were south of the equator as crossing the equator changes the angle of the sun resulting in the change of season.

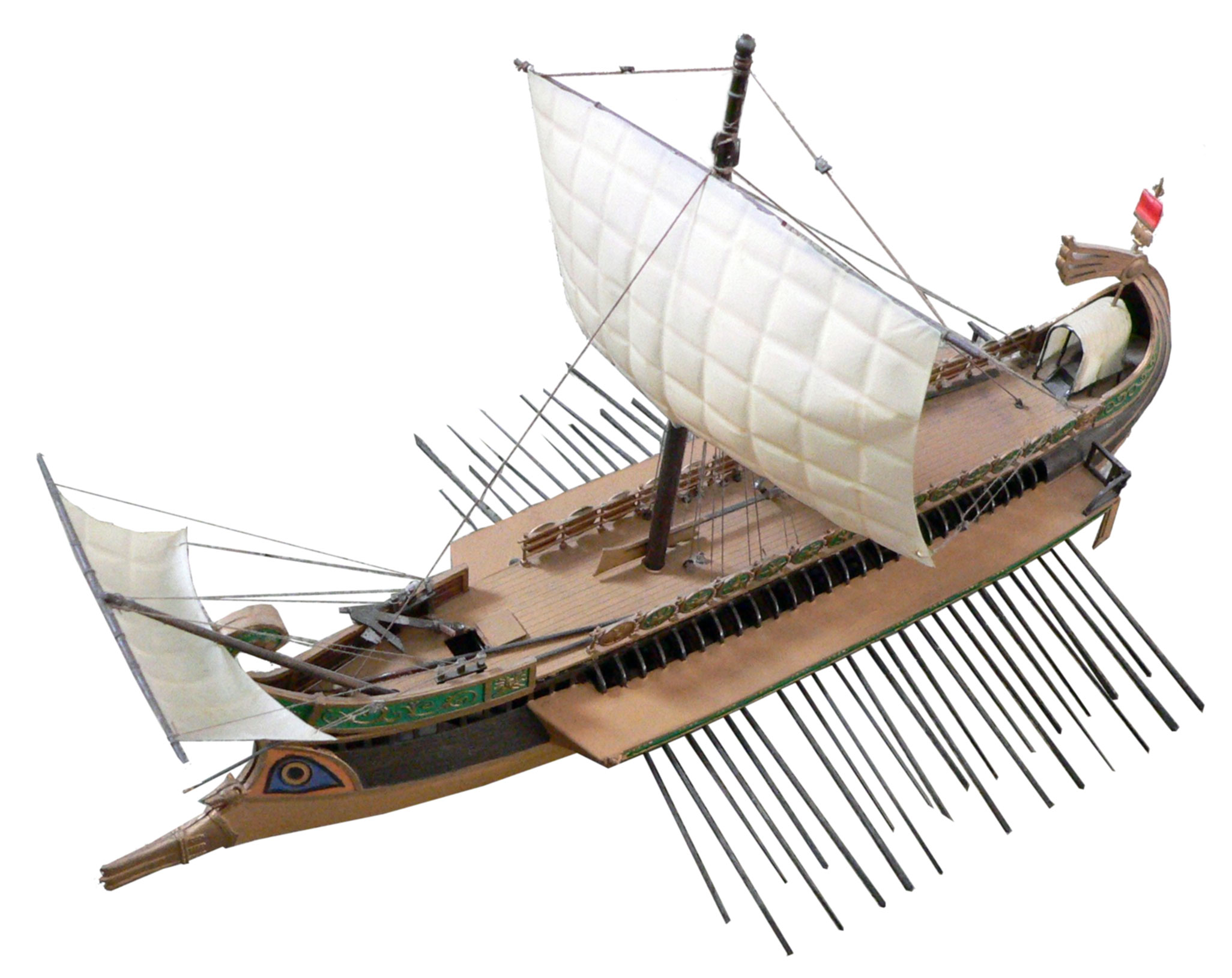
Model of a Roman bireme

Ancient Rome had a variety of ships that played crucial roles in its military, trade, and transportation activities. Rome was preceded in the use of the sea by other ancient, seafaring civilizations of the Mediterranean. The galley was a long, narrow, highly maneuverable ship powered by oarsmen, sometimes stacked in multiple levels such as biremes or triremes, and many of which also had sails. Initial efforts of the Romans to construct a war fleet were based on copies of Carthaginian warships. In the Punic wars in the mid-third century BCE, the Romans were at first outclassed by Carthage at sea, but by 256 BCE had drawn even and fought the wars to a stalemate. In 55 BCE Julius Caesar used warships and transport ships to invade Britain. Numerous types of transport ships were used to carry foodstuffs or other trade goods around the Mediterranean, many of which did double duty and were pressed into service as warships or troop transports in time of war. Roman ships are named in different ways, often in compound expressions with the word Latin: navis, lit. 'ship'. These are found in many ancient Roman texts, and named in different ways, such as by the appearance of the ship: for example, navis tecta (covered ship); or by its function, for example: navis mercatoria (commerce ship), or navis praedatoria (plunder ship). Others, like navis frumentaria (grain), navis lapidaria (stones), and navis vivaria (live fish), are about the cargo. The Althiburos mosaic in Tunisia lists many types of ships. The expression naves longae (lit. "long ships") is the plural of the noun phrase navis longa ("long ship"), following the rules for pluralization of feminine, third declension nouns in Latin, and inflectional agreement of the adjective longus to match.

== Age of navigation ==
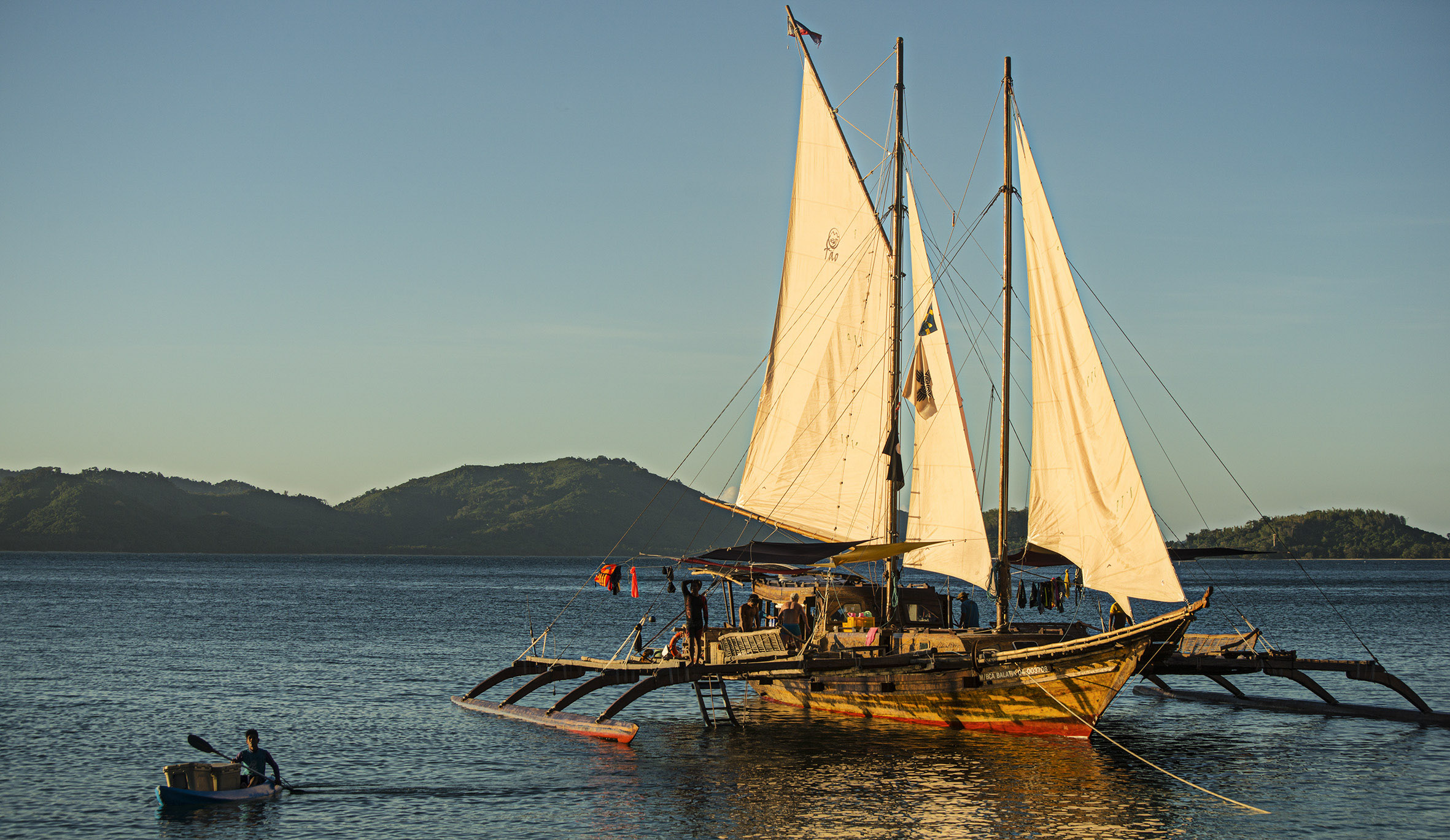
Balatik, a large outrigger sailboat built as a replica of the Visayan paraw. It is a typical Austronesian double outrigger vessel from Island Southeast Asia used in the most ancient maritime trade routes.

By 1000 BCE, Austronesians in Island Southeast Asia were already engaging in regular maritime trade with China, South Asia, and the Middle East, introducing sailing technologies to these regions. They also facilitated an exchange of cultivated crop plants, introducing Pacific coconuts, bananas, and sugarcane to the Indian subcontinent, some of which eventually reached Europe via overland Persian and Arab traders. A Chinese record in 200 AD describes one of the Austronesian ships, called kunlun bo or k'unlun po (崑崙舶, lit. "ship of the Kunlun people"). It may also have been the "kolandiaphonta" known to the Greeks. It had 4–7 masts and was able to sail against the wind due to the usage of tanja sails. These ships reached as far as Madagascar by c. 50–500 AD and Ghana by the eighth century AD.

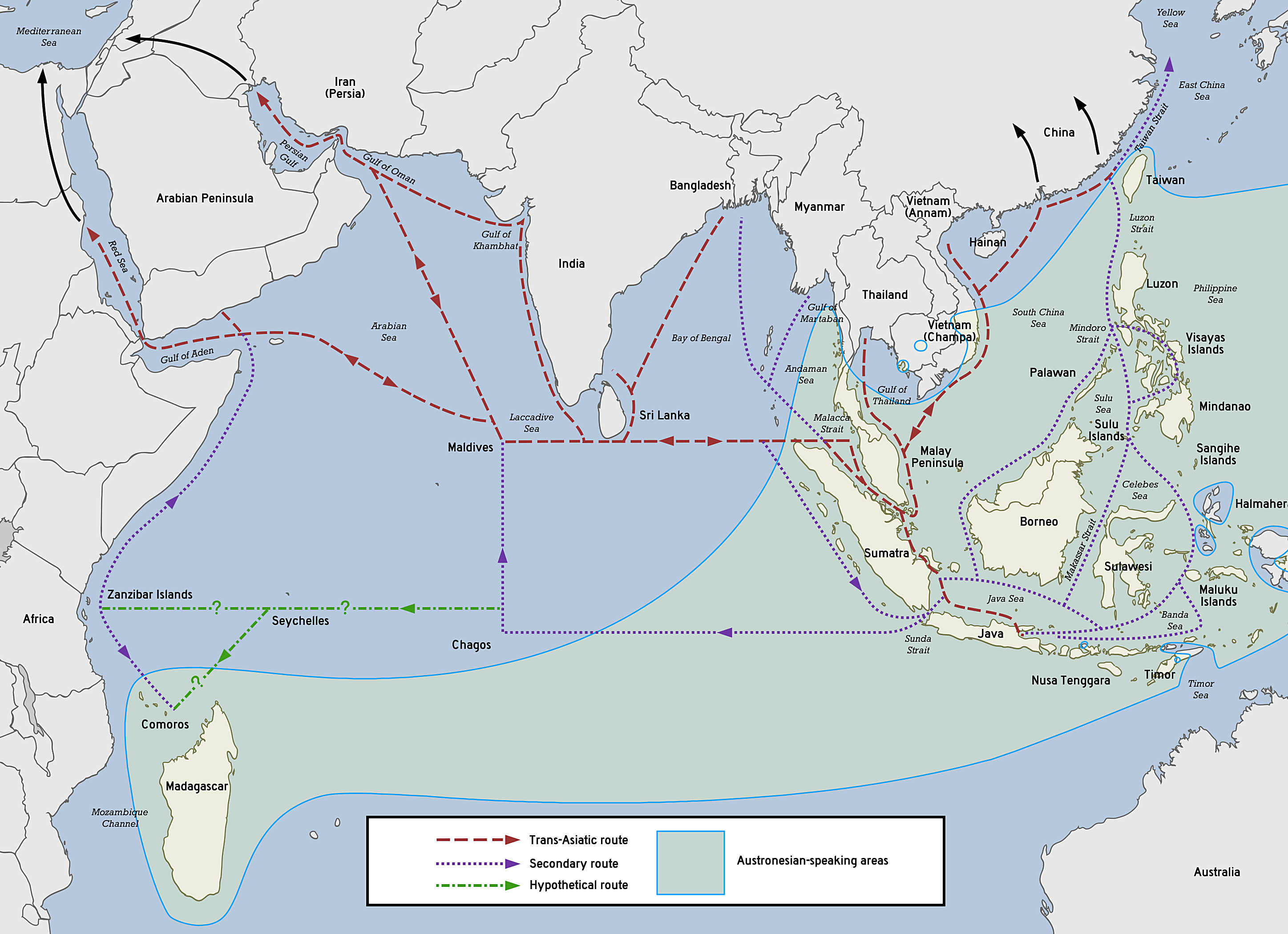
Austronesian proto-historic and historic maritime trade network in the Indian Ocean

Northern European Vikings also developed oceangoing vessels and depended heavily upon them for travel and population movements prior to 1000 AD, with the oldest known examples being longships dated to around 190 AD from the Nydam Boat site. In early modern India and Arabia the lateen-sail ship known as the dhow was used on the waters of the Red Sea, Indian Ocean, and Persian Gulf.

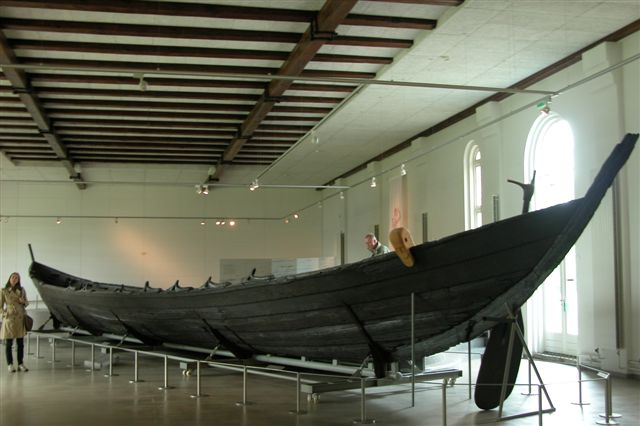
The Nydam boat (310–320 AD), one of the precursors of the Viking longships

The Chinese started building sea-going ships in the 10th century during the Song dynasty. These ships were based on Austronesian designs which had been trading with the Eastern Han dynasty since the second century AD. They purportedly reached massive sizes during the Yuan dynasty in the 14th century, and by the time of the Ming dynasty, they were used by Zheng He to send expeditions to the Indian Ocean.

Water was the cheapest and usually the only way to transport goods in bulk over long distances. In addition, it was the safest way to transport commodities. The long trade routes created popular trading ports called entrepôts. There were three popular Entrepôts in Southeast Asia: the Malaka in southwestern Malaya, Hoi An in Vietnam, and Ayuthaya in Thailand. These super centers for trade were ethnically diverse, because ports served as a midpoint of voyages and trade rather than a destination. The Entrepôts helped link the coastal cities to the "hemispheric trade nexus". The increase in sea trade initiated a cultural exchange among traders. From 1400 to 1600 the Chinese population doubled from 75 million to 150 million as a result of imported goods; this was known as the "age of commerce".

The mariner's astrolabe was the chief tool of Celestial navigation in early modern maritime history. This scaled down version of the instrument used by astronomers served as a navigational aid to measure latitude at sea, and was employed by Portuguese sailors no later than 1481.

The precise date of the discovery of the magnetic needle compass is undetermined, but the earliest attestation of the device for navigation was in the Dream Pool Essays by Shen Kuo (1088). Kuo was also the first to document the concept of true north to discern a compass' magnetic declination from the physical north magnetic pole. The earliest iterations of the compass consisted of a floating, magnetized lodestone needle that spun around in a water-filled bowl until it reached alignment with Earth's magnetic poles. Chinese sailors were using the "wet" compass to determine the southern cardinal direction no later than 1117. The first use of a magnetized needle for seafaring navigation in Europe was written of by Alexander Neckham, circa 1190. Around 1300, the pivot-needle dry-box compass was invented in Europe; it pointed north, similar to the modern-day mariner's compass. In Europe the device also included a compass-card, which was later adopted by the Chinese through contact with Japanese pirates in the 16th century.

The oldest known map is dated back to 12,000 BC; it was discovered in a Spanish cave by Pilar Utrilla. The early maps were oriented with east at the top. This is believed to have begun in the Middle East. Religion played a role in the drawing of maps. Countries that were predominantly Christian during the Middle Ages placed east at the top of the maps, in part due to Genesis, "the Lord God planted a garden toward the east in Eden". This led to maps containing the image of Jesus Christ, and the garden of Eden at the top of maps. The latitude and longitude coordinate tables were made with the sole purpose of praying towards Mecca. The next progression of maps came with the portolan chart. This was the first type of map that labeled North at the top and was drawn proportionate to size. Landmarks were drawn in great detail.

=== Ships and vessels ===
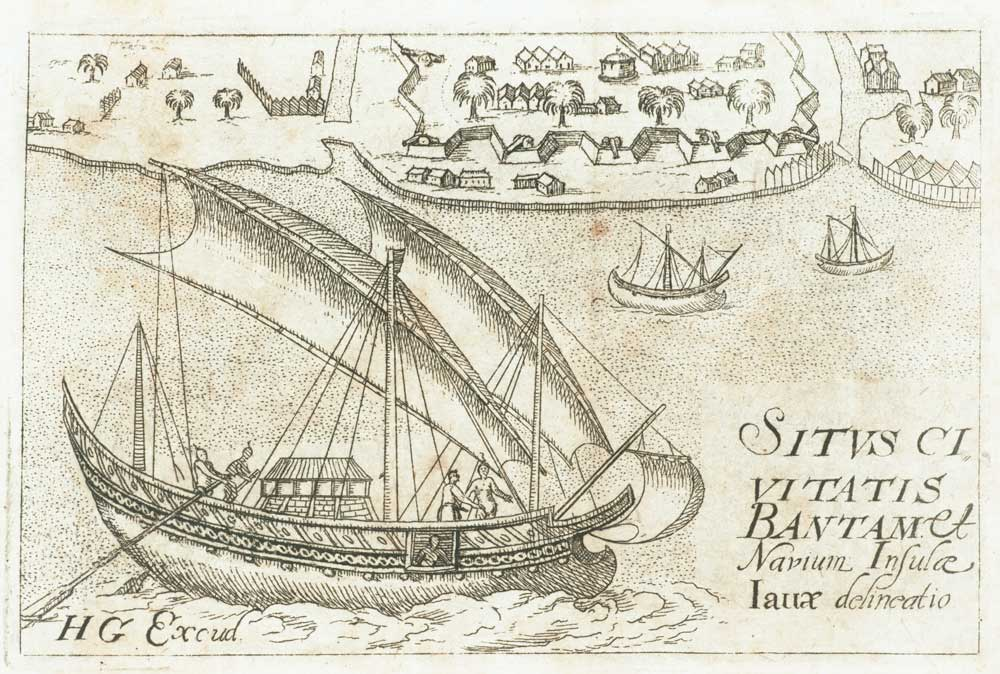
Jong of Banten, early 1600s

Various ships were in use during the Middle Ages. The jong, a type of large sailing ship from Nusantara, was built using wooden dowels without iron nails and multiple planks to endure heavy seas. The chuan (junk) design was both innovative and adaptable. Junk vessels employed mat and batten style sails that could be raised and lowered in segments, as well varying angles. The longship was a type of ship developed over a period of centuries and perfected by its most famous users, the Vikings, around the 9th century. The ships were clinker-built, using overlapping wooden strakes. The knaar, a relative of the longship, was a type of cargo vessel. It differed from the longship in that it was larger and relied solely on its square rigged sail for propulsion. The cog was a design which is believed to have evolved from (or at least been influenced by) the longship, and was in wide use by the 12th century. It too used the clinker method of construction. The caravel was a ship invented in Islamic Iberia and used in the Mediterranean from the 13th century. Unlike the longship and cog, it used a carvel method of construction. It could be either square rigged (caravela redonda) or lateen rigged (caravela latina). The carrack was another type of ship invented in the Mediterranean in the 15th century. It was a larger vessel than the caravel. Columbus's ship, the Santa María, was a famous example of a carrack.

=== Arab age of discovery ===
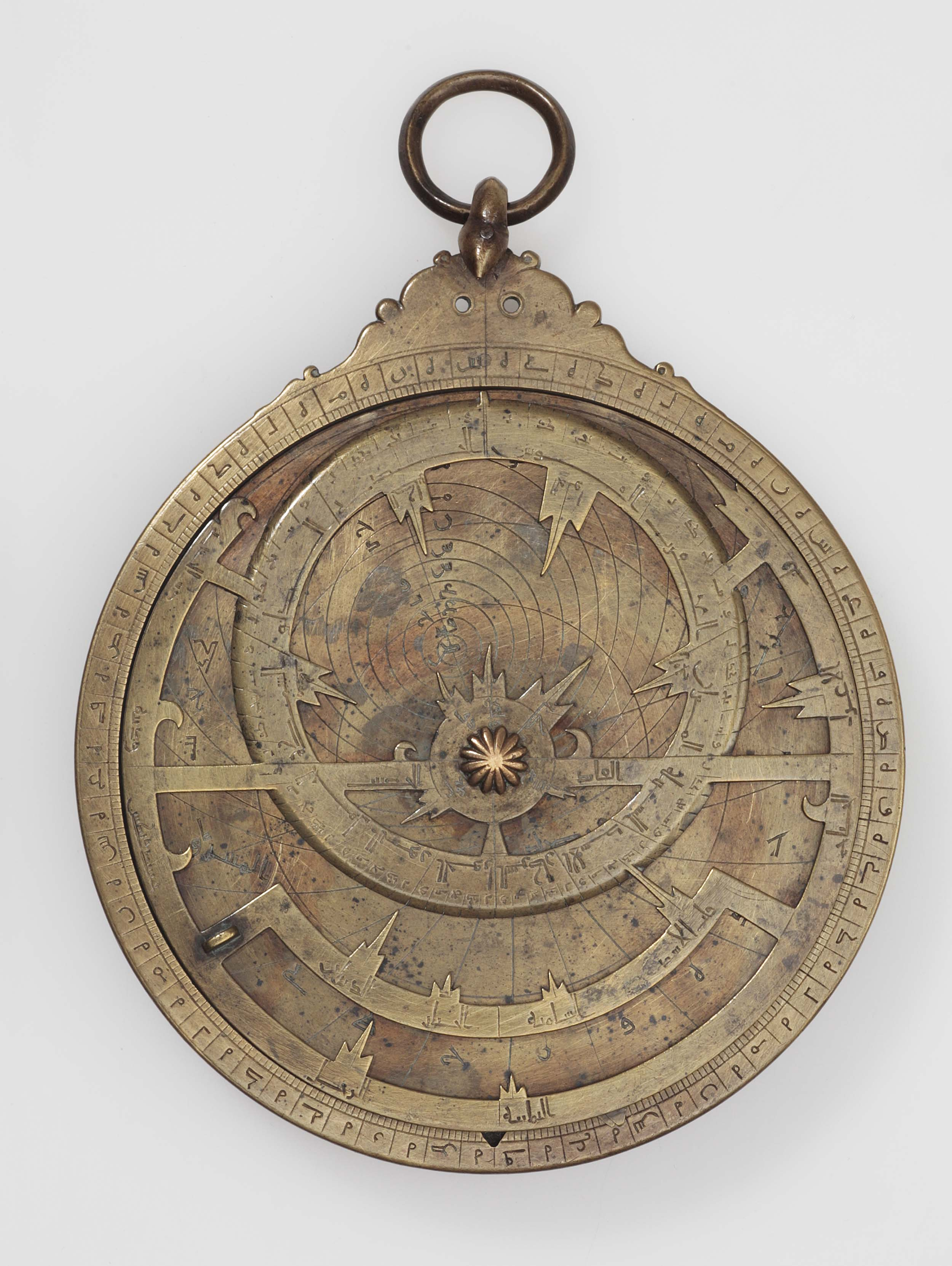
Astrolabe from 9th century North Africa

The Arab Empire maintained and expanded a wide trade network across parts of Asia, Africa and Europe. This helped establish the Arab Empire (including the Rashidun, Umayyad, Abbasid and Fatimid caliphates) as the world's leading extensive economic power throughout the 8th–13th centuries according to the political scientist John M. Hobson. The Belitung is the oldest discovered Arabic ship to reach the Asian sea, dating back over 1000 years.

Apart from the Nile, Tigris and Euphrates, navigable rivers in the Islamic regions were uncommon, so transport by sea was very important. Islamic geography and navigational sciences were highly developed, making use of a magnetic compass and a rudimentary instrument known as a kamal, used for celestial navigation and for measuring the altitudes and latitudes of the stars. When combined with detailed maps of the period, sailors were able to sail across oceans rather than skirt along the coast. According to the political scientist John M. Hobson, the origins of the caravel ship, used for long-distance travel by the Spanish and Portuguese since the 15th century, date back to the qarib used by Andalusian explorers by the 13th century.

Control of sea routes dictated the political and military power of the Islamic nation. The Islamic border spread from Spain to China. Maritime trade was used to link the vast territories that spanned the Mediterranean Sea to the Indian Ocean (see also: Indo-Mediterranean). The Arabs were among the first to sail the Indian Ocean. Long-distance trade allowed the movement of "armies, craftsmen, scholars, and pilgrims". Sea trade was an important factor not just for the coastal ports and cities like Istanbul, but also for Baghdad and Iraq, which are further inland. Sea trade enabled the distribution of food and supplies to feed entire populations in the middle east. Long distance sea trade imported raw materials for building, luxury goods for the wealthy, and new inventions.

=== Hanseatic League ===
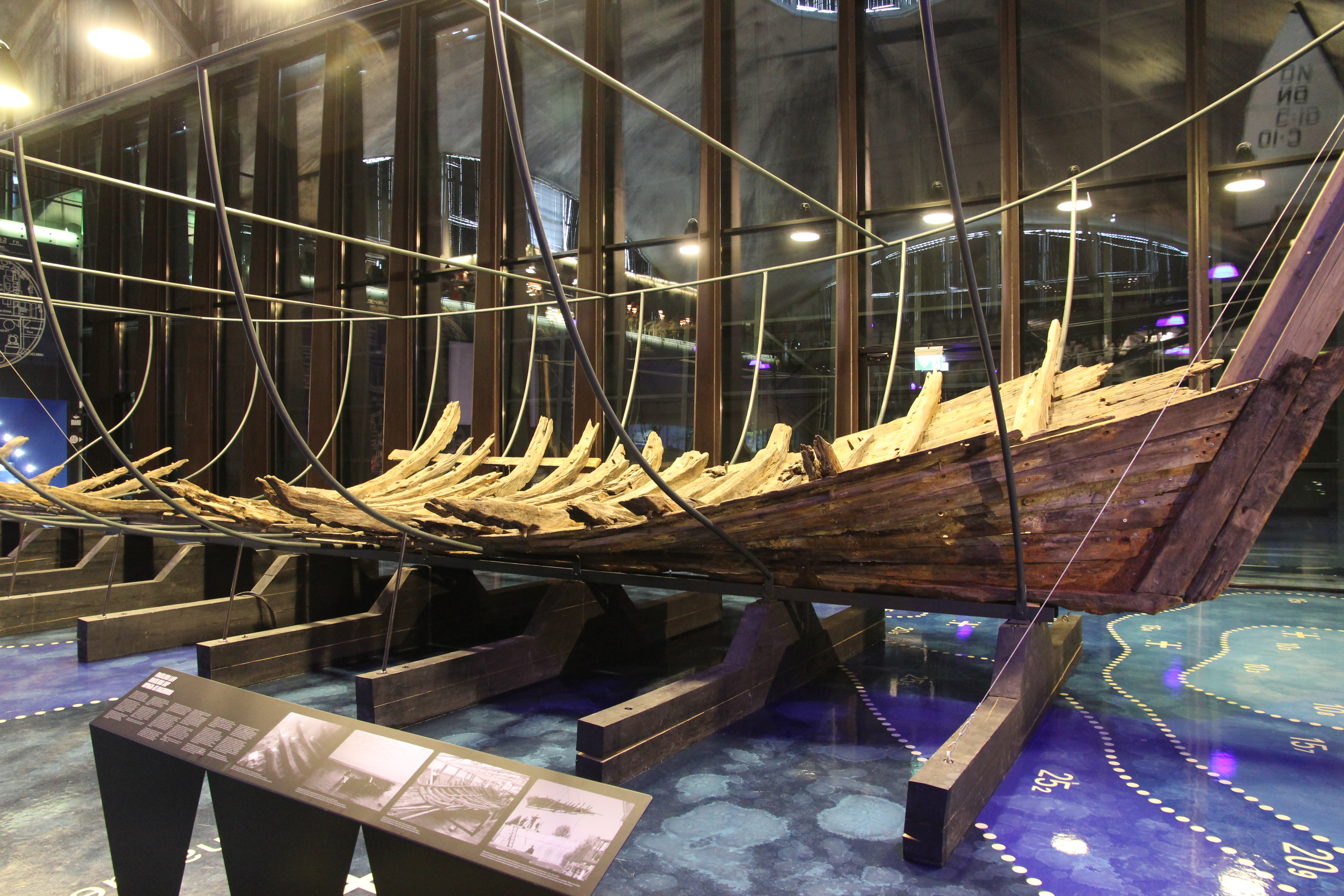
Maasilinna shipwreck from circa 1550 was discovered in 1985 and is now presented in Estonian Maritime Museum. This ship was used in the 16th century in the Baltic Sea.

The Hanseatic League was an alliance of trading guilds that established and maintained a trade monopoly over the Baltic Sea, to a certain extent the North Sea, and most of Northern Europe for a time in the Late Middle Ages and the early modern period, between the 13th and 17th centuries. Historians generally trace the origins of the League to the foundation of the Northern German town of Lübeck, established in 1158/1159 after the capture of the area from the Count of Schauenburg and Holstein by Henry the Lion, the Duke of Saxony. Exploratory trading adventures, raids and piracy had occurred earlier throughout the Baltic (see Vikings)—the sailors of Gotland sailed up rivers as far away as Novgorod, for example—but the scale of international economy in the Baltic area remained insignificant before the growth of the Hanseatic League. German cities achieved domination of trade in the Baltic with striking speed over the next century, and Lübeck became a central node in all the seaborne trade that linked the areas around the North Sea and the Baltic Sea.

The 15th century saw the climax of Lübeck's hegemony. (Visby, one of the midwives of the Hanseatic league in 1358, declined to become a member. Visby dominated trade in the Baltic before the Hanseatic league, and with its monopolistic ideology, suppressed the Gotlandic free-trade competition.) By the late 16th century, the League imploded and could no longer deal with its own internal struggles, the social and political changes that accompanied the Reformation, the rise of Dutch and English merchants, and the incursion of the Ottoman Empire upon its trade routes and upon the Holy Roman Empire itself. Only nine members attended the last formal meeting in 1669 and only three (Lübeck, Hamburg and Bremen) remained as members until its final demise in 1862.

=== Italian maritime republics ===
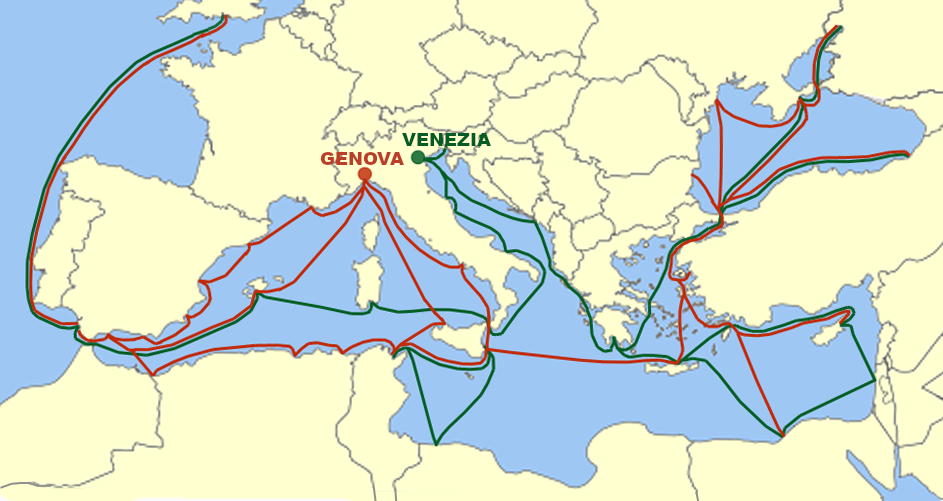
Left: flag of the Italian Navy. Clockwise, from upper left: the coat of arms of Venice, Genoa, Pisa and Amalfi.
Right: trade routes, colonies of the Genoa and Venice.

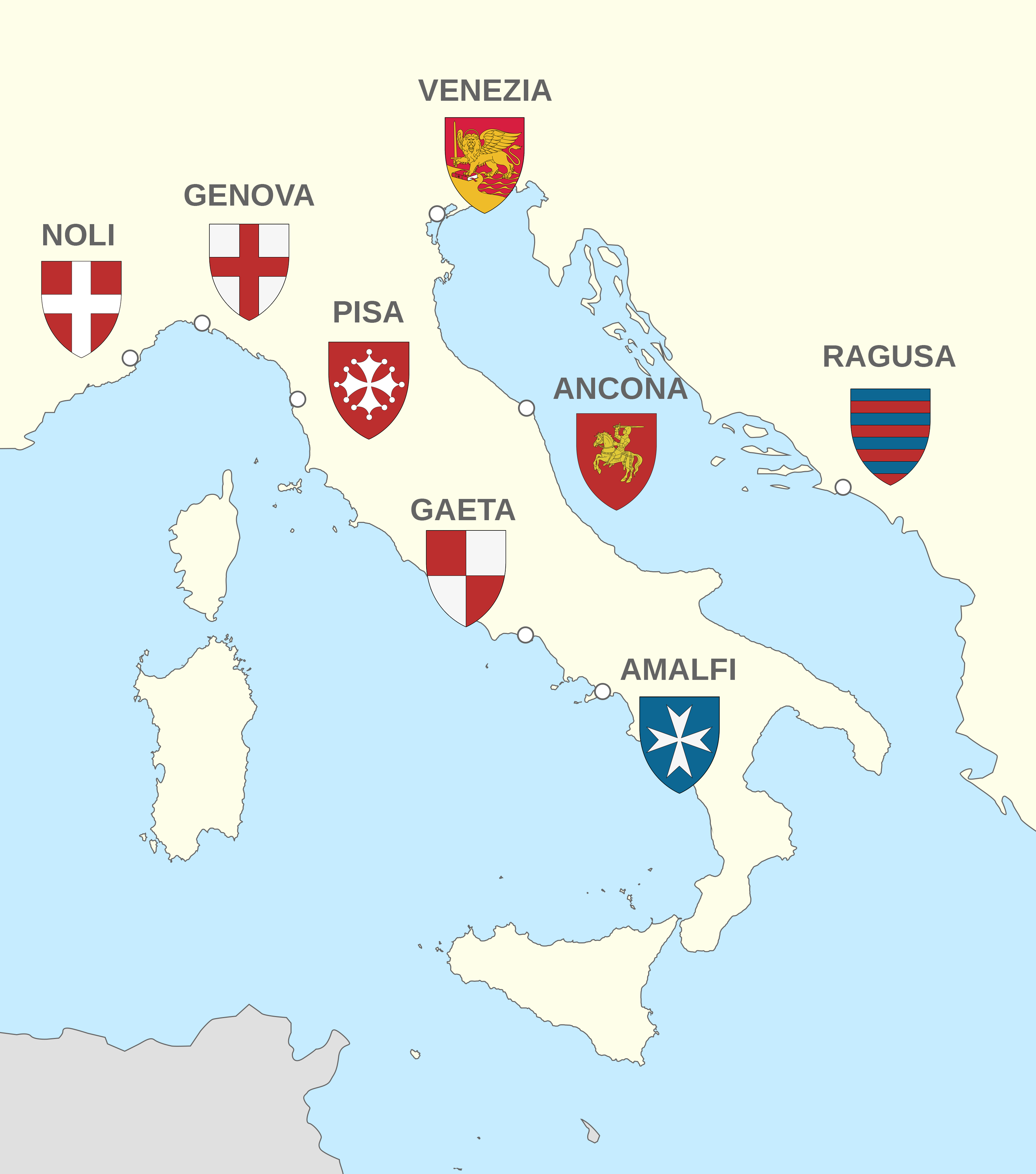
A map with the locations and coats of arms of the maritime republics of medieval Italy: Venice, Genoa, Amalfi, Pisa, Noli, Ancona, Ragusa, Gaeta

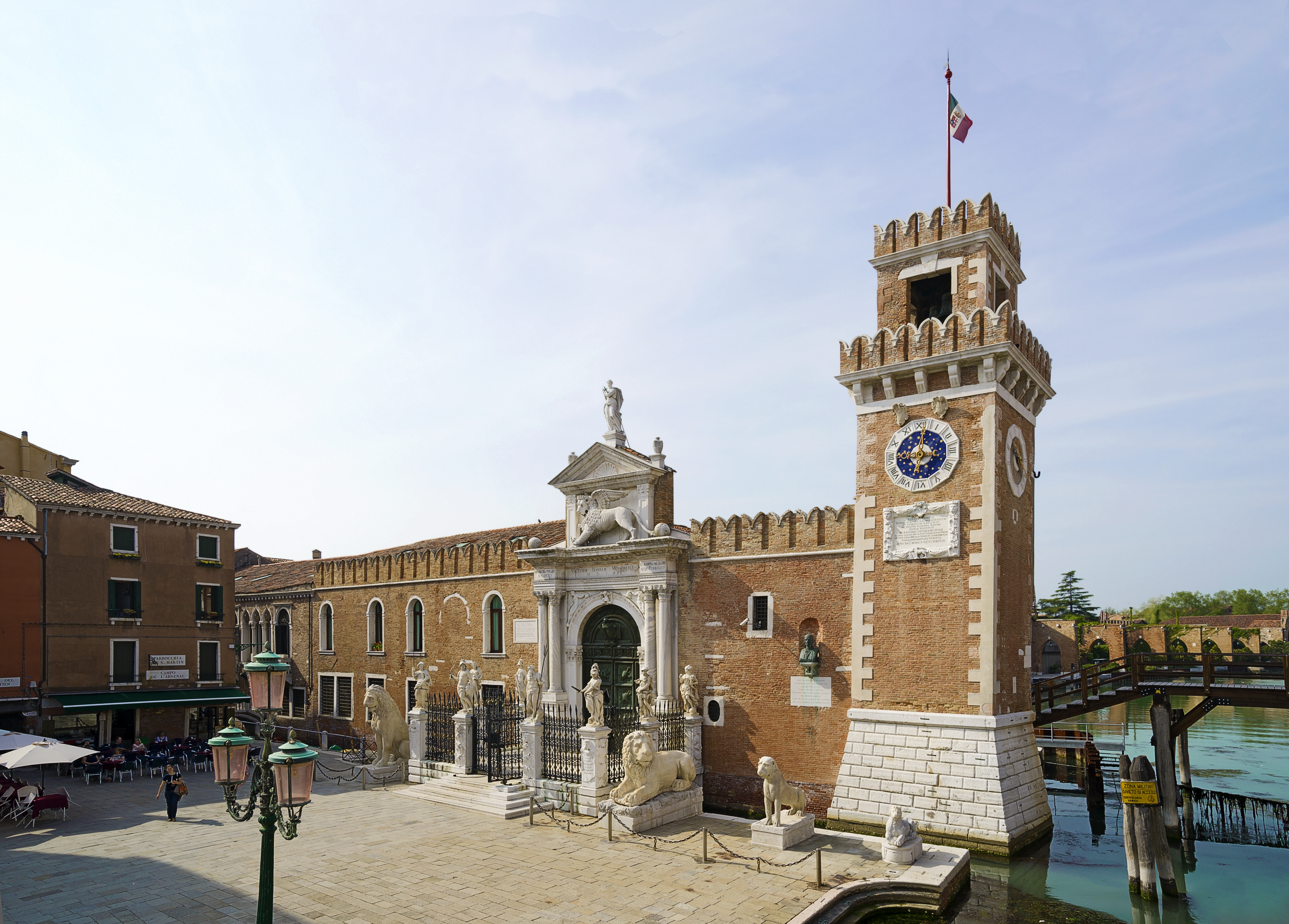
The maritime republics built the ships they needed in their own arsenals. Pictured is the Venetian Arsenal.

The maritime republics, also called merchant republics, were Italian thalassocratic port cities which, starting from the Middle Ages, enjoyed political autonomy and economic prosperity brought about by their maritime activities. The term, coined during the 19th century, generally refers to four Italian cities, whose coats of arms have been shown since 1947 on the flags of the Italian Navy and the Italian Merchant Navy: Amalfi, Genoa, Pisa, and Venice. In addition to the four best known cities, Ancona, Gaeta, Noli, and, in Dalmatia, Ragusa, are also considered maritime republics; in certain historical periods, they were of comparable importance to some of the better known cities.

Uniformly scattered across the Italian peninsula, the maritime republics were important not only for the history of navigation and commerce: in addition to precious goods otherwise unobtainable in Europe, new artistic ideas and news concerning distant countries also spread. From the 10th century, they built fleets of ships both for their own protection and to support extensive trade networks across the Mediterranean, giving them an essential role in reestablishing contacts between Europe, Asia, and Africa, which had been interrupted during the early Middle Ages. They also had an essential role in the Crusades and produced renowned explorers and navigators such as Marco Polo and Christopher Columbus.

Over the centuries, the maritime republics—both the best known and the lesser known but not always less important—experienced fluctuating fortunes. In the 9th and 10th centuries, this phenomenon began with Amalfi and Gaeta, which soon reached their heyday. Meanwhile, Venice began its gradual ascent, while the other cities were still experiencing the long gestation that would lead them to their autonomy and to follow up on their seafaring vocation. After the 11th century, Amalfi and Gaeta declined rapidly, while Genoa and Venice became the most powerful republics. Pisa followed and experienced its most flourishing period in the 13th century, and Ancona and Ragusa allied to resist Venetian power. Following the 14th century, while Pisa declined to the point of losing its autonomy, Venice and Genoa continued to dominate navigation, followed by Ragusa and Ancona, which experienced their golden age in the 15th century. In the 16th century, with Ancona's loss of autonomy, only the republics of Venice, Genoa, and Ragusa remained, which still experienced great moments of splendor until the mid-17th century, followed by over a century of slow decline that ended with the Napoleonic invasion.

The maritime republics reestablished contacts between Europe, Asia and Africa, which were almost interrupted after the fall of the Western Roman Empire; their history is intertwined both with the launch of European expansion towards the East and with the origins of modern capitalism as a mercantile and financial system. In these cities, gold coins, which had not been used for centuries, were minted, new exchange and accounting practices were developed, and thus international finance and commercial law were born.

Technological advances in navigation were also encouraged; important in this regard was the improvement and diffusion of the compass by the Amalfi people and the Venetian invention of the great galley. Navigation owes much to the maritime republics as regards nautical cartography: the maps of the 14th and 15th centuries that are still in use today all belong to the schools of Genoa, Venice, and Ancona.

From the East, the maritime republics imported a vast range of goods unobtainable in Europe, which they then resold in other cities of Italy and central and northern Europe, creating a commercial triangle between the Arab East, the Byzantine Empire, and Italy. Until the discovery of America they were therefore essential nodes of trade between Europe and the other continents.

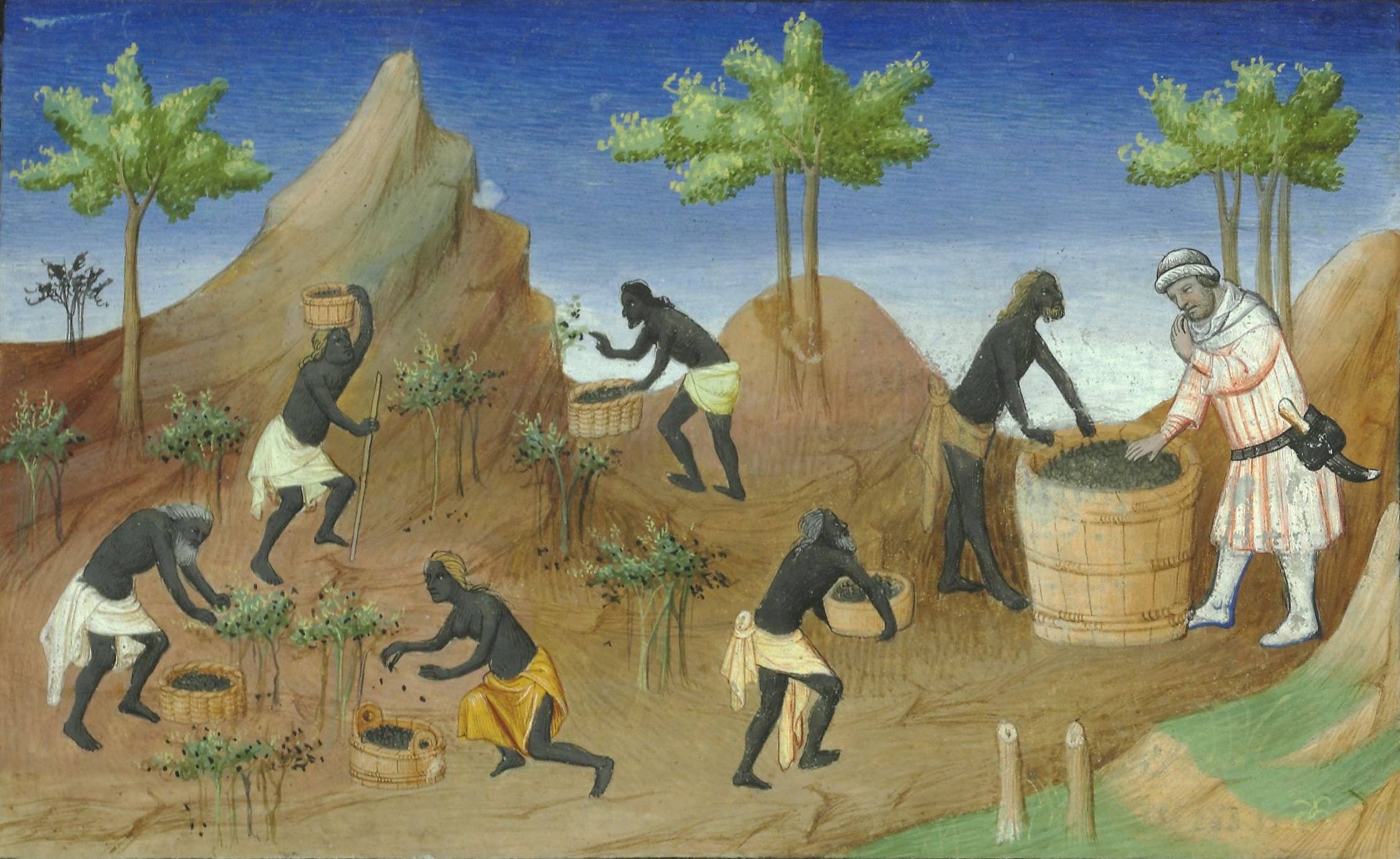
The harvesting of pepper; from the 15th century French edition of Marco Polo's The Travels of Marco Polo

Among the most important products were:

- Medicines: aloe vera, balsam, ginger, camphor, laudanum, cardamom, rhubarb, astragalus
- Spices: black pepper, cloves, nutmeg, cinnamon, white sugar
- Perfumes and odorous substances to burn: musk, mastic, sandalwood, incense, ambergris
- Dyes: indigo, alum, carmine, varnish
- Textiles: silk, Egyptian linen, sambe, brocade, velvet, damask, carpets
- Luxury products: gemstones, precious coral, pearls, ivory, porcelain, gold and silver threads

The maritime republics' great prosperity deriving from trade had a significant impact on the history of art, to the point that five of them (Amalfi, Genoa, Venice, Pisa and Ragusa) are today included in UNESCO's list of World Heritage Sites. Although an artistic current common to all of them and exclusive to them cannot be described, a characterizing trait was the mixture of elements of the various Mediterranean artistic traditions, mainly Byzantine, Islamic and Romanesque elements.

The modern Italian communities living in Greece, Turkey, Lebanon, Gibraltar, and Crimea descend, at least in part, from the colonies of the maritime republics, as well as the language island of the Tabarchino dialect in Sardinia and the extinct Italian community of Odesa.

=== Somali maritime enterprise ===
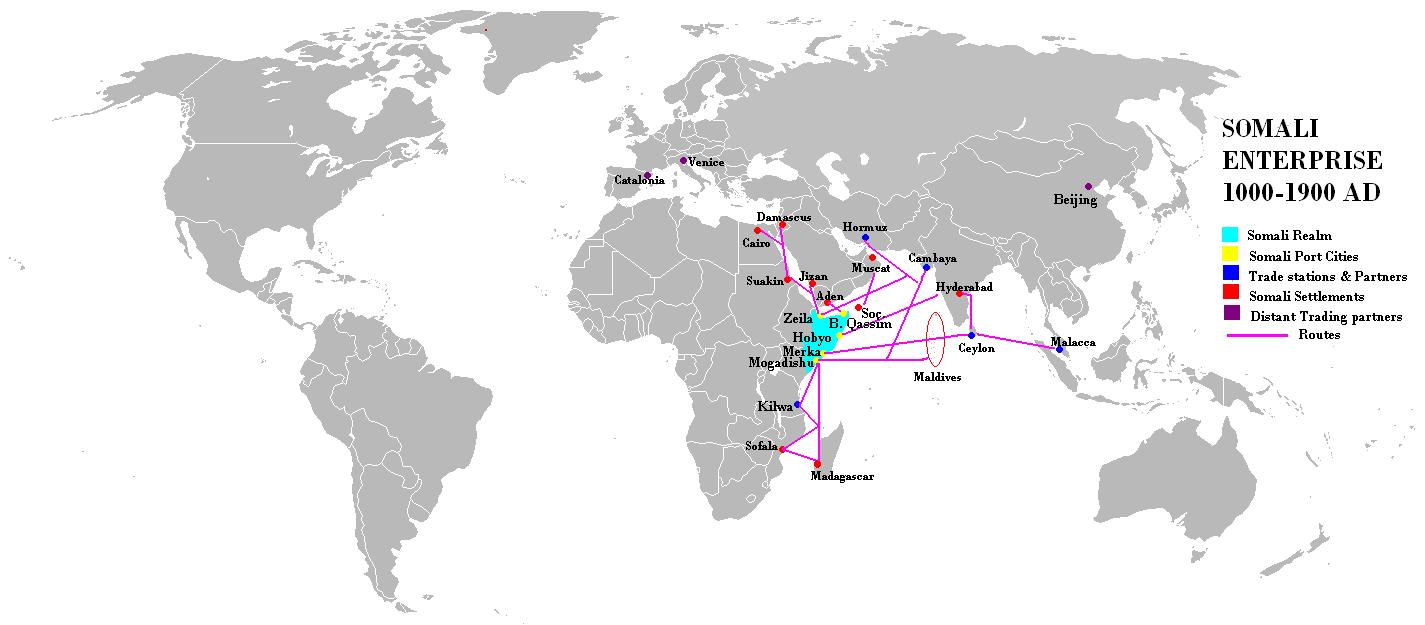
Historical Somali commercial enterprise in the Red Sea, the Persian Gulf, the Indian Ocean, and the straits of Malacca

During the Age of the Ajuran, the Somali sultanates and republics of Merca, Mogadishu, Barawa, Hobyo and their respective ports flourished. They had a lucrative foreign commerce with ships sailing to and coming from Arabia, India, Venetia, Persia, Egypt, Portugal and as far away as China. In the 16th century, Duarte Barbosa noted that many ships from the Kingdom of Cambaya in what is modern-day India sailed to Mogadishu with cloths and spices, for which they in return received gold, wax and ivory. Barbosa also highlighted the abundance of meat, wheat, barley, horses, and fruit on the coastal markets, which generated enormous wealth for the merchants.

In the early modern period, successor states of the Adal and Ajuran empires began to flourish in Somalia who continued the seaborne trade established by previous Somali empires. The rise of the 19th century Gobroon dynasty in particular saw a rebirth in Somali maritime enterprise. During this period, the Somali agricultural output to Arabian markets was so great that the coast of Somalia came to be known as the Grain Coast of Yemen and Oman.

== Age of Discovery ==
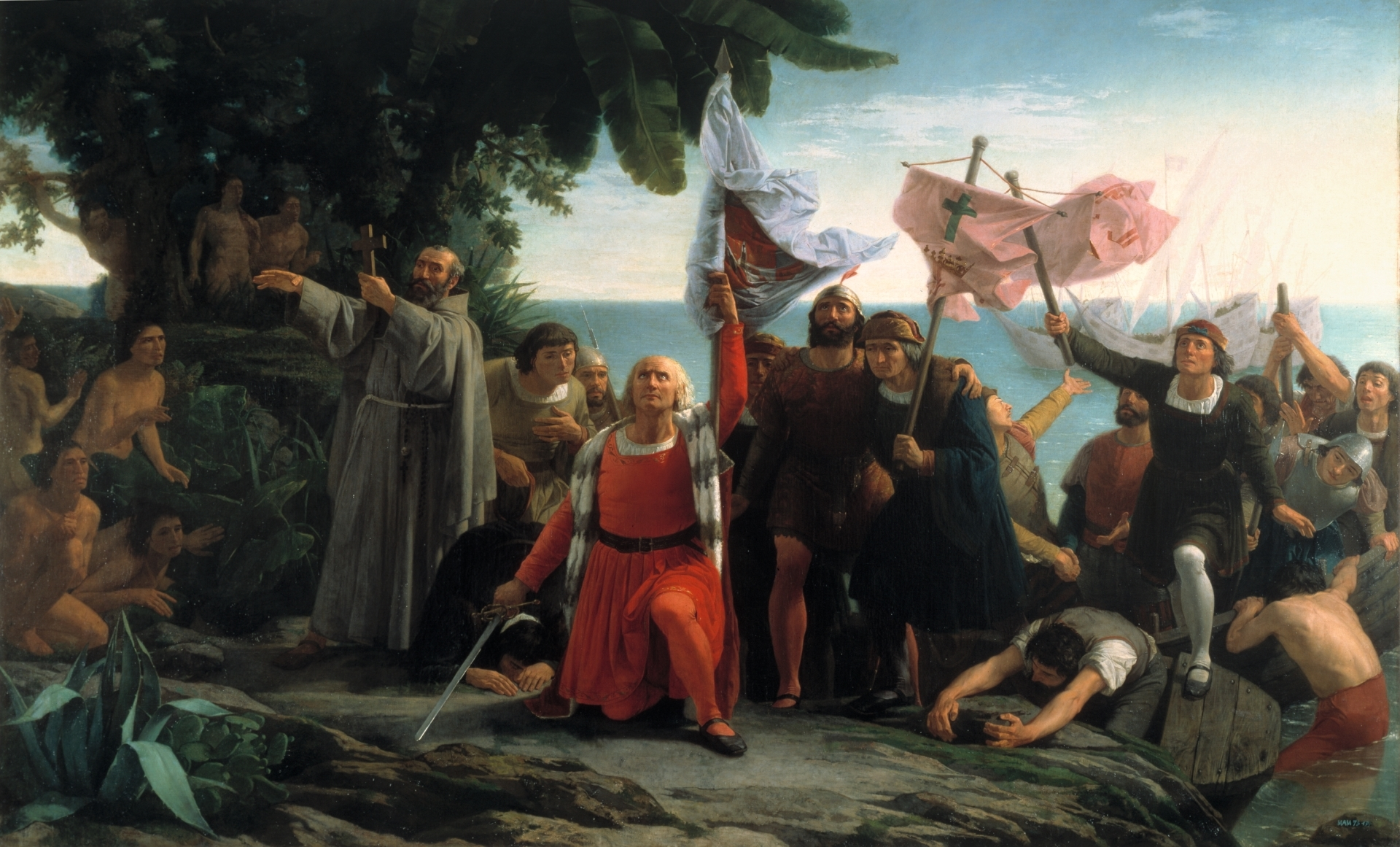
The Italian explorer Christopher Columbus leads an expedition to the New World, 1492. His voyages are celebrated as the discovery of the Americas from a European perspective, and they opened a new era in the history of humankind and sustained contact between the two worlds.

The Age of Discovery was a period from the early 15th century and continuing into the early 17th century, during which European ships traveled around the world to search for new trading routes after the Fall of Constantinople. Historians often refer to the 'Age of Discovery' as the pioneer Portuguese and later Spanish long-distance maritime travels in search of alternative trade routes to "the East Indies", moved by the trade of gold, silver and spices. In the process, Europeans encountered peoples and mapped lands previously unknown to them. The Portuguese discovery of the sea route to India changed Europe's view of the world.

Italian navigators and explorers played a key role in the exploration and settlement of the Americas by Europeans. Genoese explorer Christopher Columbus (Italian: Cristoforo Colombo [kriˈstɔːforo koˈlombo]) completed four voyages across the Atlantic Ocean for the Catholic Monarchs of Spain. These voyages led to the widespread knowledge of the New World. This breakthrough inaugurated the period known as the Age of Discovery, which saw the colonization of the Americas, a related biological exchange, and trans-Atlantic trade. These events, the effects and consequences of which persist to the present, are often cited as the beginning of the modern era.

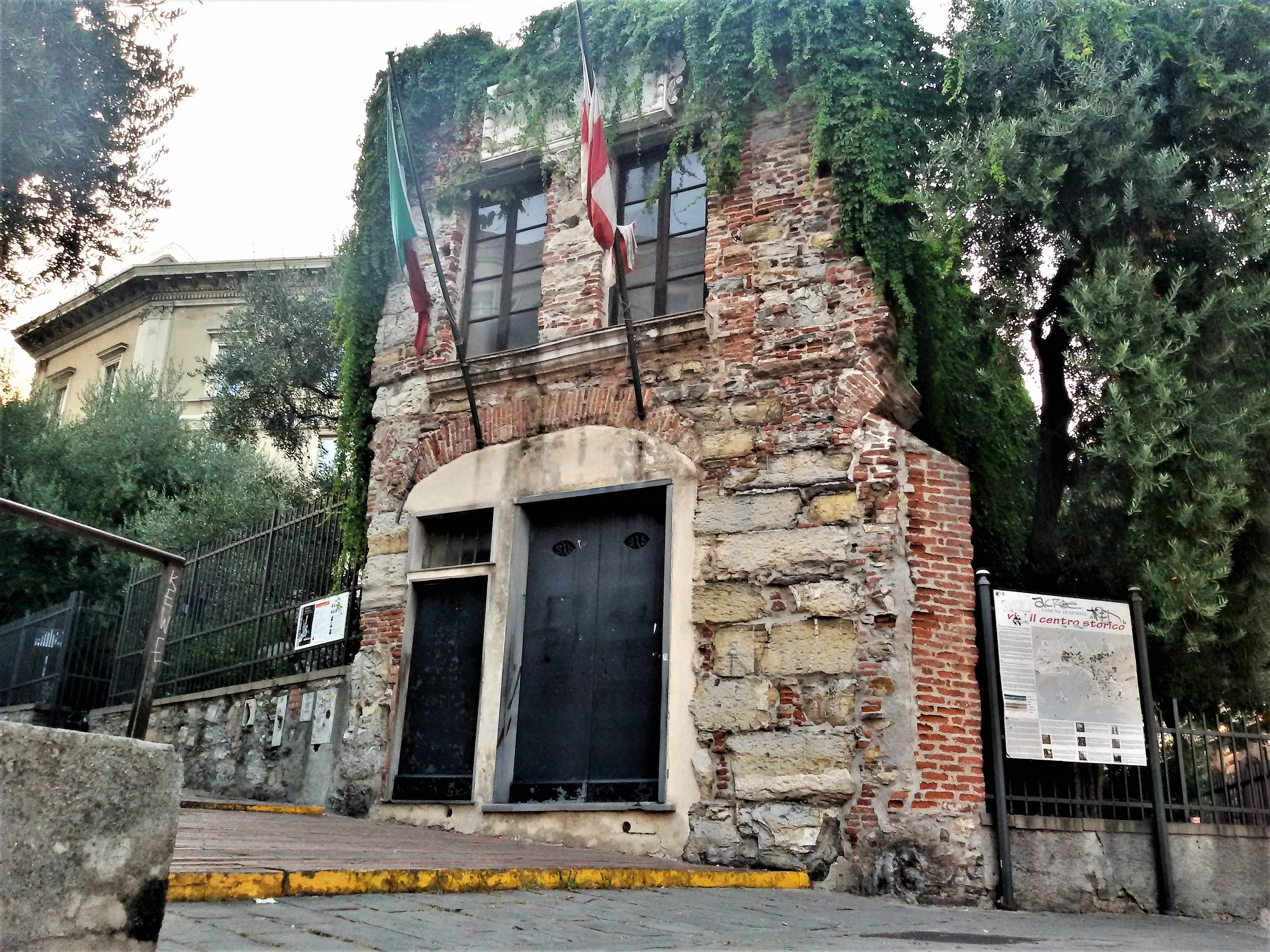
Christopher Columbus House in Genoa, Italy, an 18th-century reconstruction of the house in which Columbus grew up. The original was likely destroyed during the 1684 bombardment of Genoa.

Christopher Columbus was an Italian navigator and maritime explorer who is one of several historical figures credited as the discoverer of the Americas. It is generally believed that he was born in Genoa, although other theories and possibilities exist. Columbus' voyages across the Atlantic Ocean began a European effort at exploration and colonization of the Western Hemisphere. While history places great significance on his first voyage of 1492, he did not actually reach the mainland until his third voyage in 1498. Likewise, he was not the earliest European explorer to reach the Americas, as there are accounts of European transatlantic contact prior to 1492. Nevertheless, Columbus's voyage came at a critical time of growing national imperialism and economic competition between developing nation states seeking wealth from the establishment of trade routes and colonies. Therefore, the period before 1492 is known as Pre-Columbian.

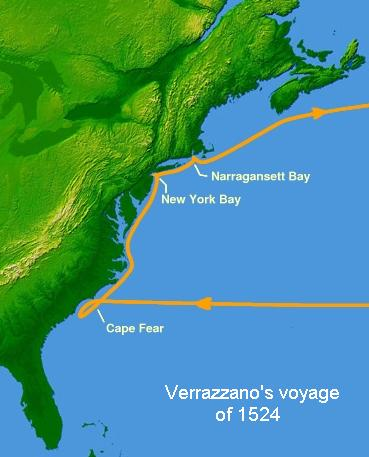
Giovanni da Verrazzano's voyage of 1524. The Italian explorer was the first documented European to enter New York Harbor and the Hudson River.

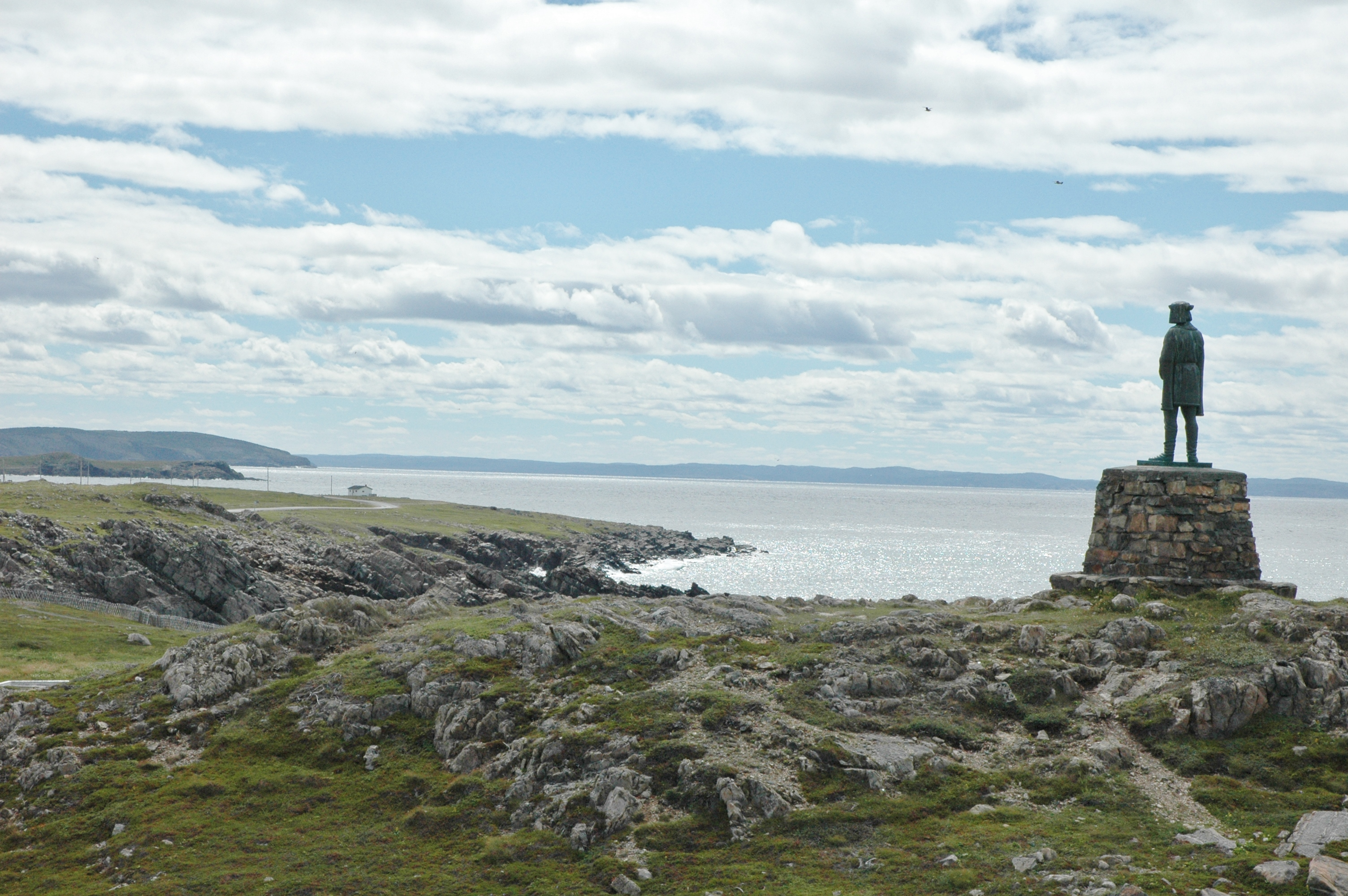
A statue of the Italian explorer John Cabot gazing across Bonavista Bay in eastern Newfoundland

World map of Waldseemüller (Germany, 1507), which first used the name America (in the lower-left section, over South America). The name America derives from the Italian explorer Amerigo Vespucci.

Born in the Republic of Genoa, Columbus was a navigator who sailed in search of a westward route to India, China, Japan and the Spice Islands thought to be the East Asian source of spices and other precious oriental goods obtainable only through arduous overland routes. Columbus was partly inspired by 13th-century Italian explorer Marco Polo in his ambition to explore Asia. His initial belief that he had reached "the Indies" has resulted in the name "West Indies" being attached to the Bahamas and the islands of the Caribbean. At the time of Columbus's voyages, the Americas were inhabited by Indigenous Americans, and Columbus later participated in the beginning of the Spanish conquest of the Americas.

Another Italian, John Cabot (Italian: Giovanni Caboto [dʒoˈvanni kaˈbɔːto]), together with his son Sebastian, explored the eastern seaboard of North America for Henry VII in the early 16th century. The historian Alwyn Ruddock worked on Cabot and his era for 35 years. She suggested that Cabot and his expedition successfully returned to England in the spring of 1500. She claimed their return followed an epic two-year exploration of the east coast of North America, south into the Chesapeake Bay area and perhaps as far as the Spanish territories in the Caribbean. Her evidence included the well-known world map of the Spanish cartographer Juan de la Cosa. His chart included the North American coast and seas "discovered by the English" between 1497 and 1500.

The Cabot Project at the University of Bristol was organized in 2009 to search for the evidence on which Ruddock's claims rest, as well as to undertake related studies of Cabot and his expeditions. The lead researchers on the project, Evan Jones and Margaret Condon, claim to have found further evidence to support aspects of Ruddock's case, including some of the information she intended to use to argue for a successful return of the 1498 expedition to Bristol. These appear to place John Cabot in London by May 1500, although Jones and Condon have yet to publish their documentation.

Jacques Cartier was a French navigator who first explored and described the Gulf of St-Lawrence and the shores of the Saint Lawrence River, which he named Canada, likely comes from the Huron-Iroquois word "kanata", meaning "village" or "settlement". Juan Fernández was a Spanish explorer and navigator. Probably between 1563 and 1574 he discovered the Juan Fernández Islands west of Valparaíso, Chile. He also discovered the Pacific islands of San Félix and San Ambrosio (1574). Among the other famous explorers of the period were Vasco da Gama, Pedro Álvares Cabral, Yermak, Juan Ponce de León, Francisco Coronado, Juan Sebastián Elcano, Bartolomeu Dias, Ferdinand Magellan, Willem Barentsz, Abel Tasman, Jean Alfonse, Samuel de Champlain, Willem Jansz, Captain James Cook, Henry Hudson, and Giovanni da Verrazzano.

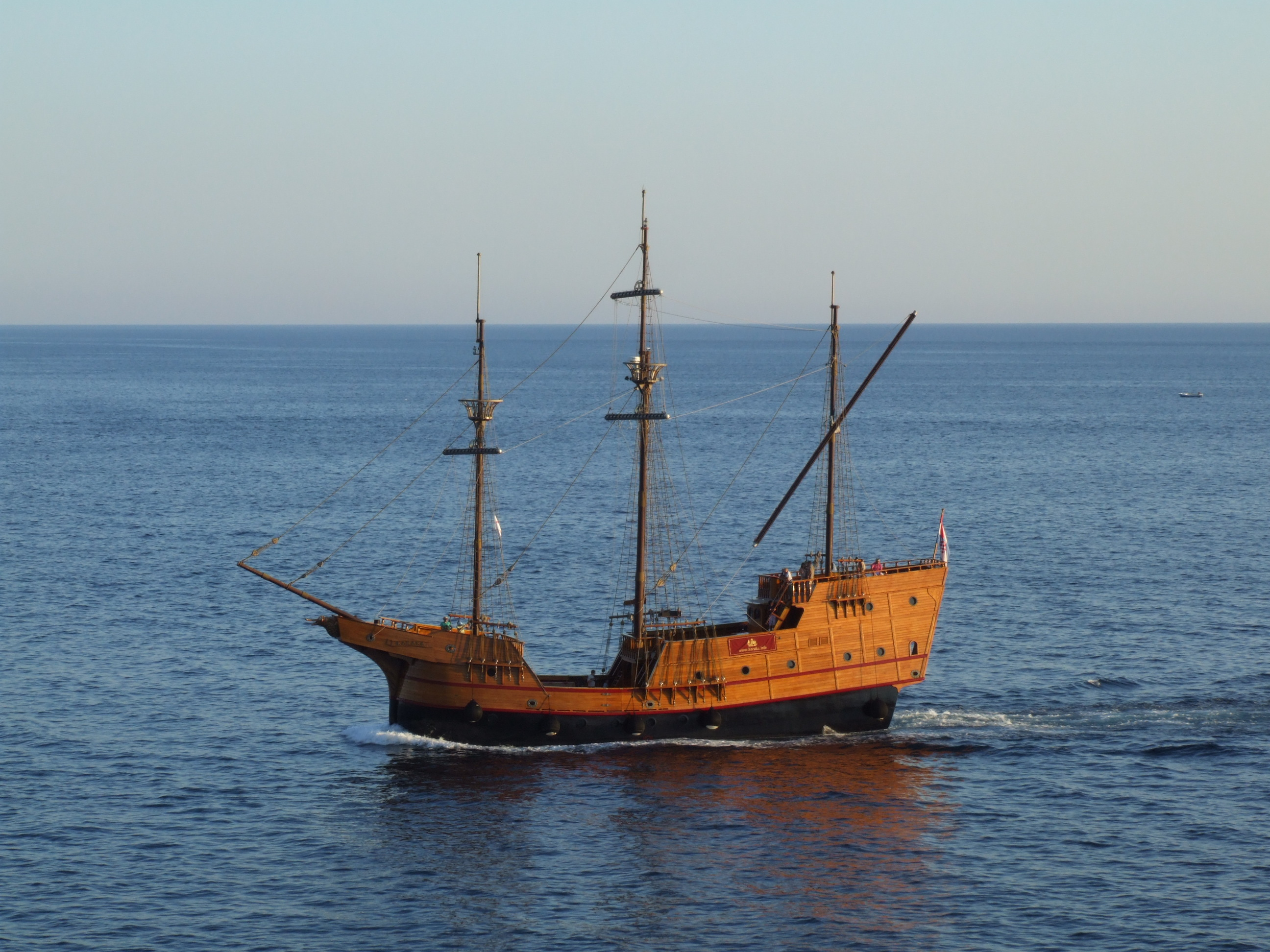
Replica of the Republic of Ragusa Carrack or Argosy (15th and 16th century).

In 1524 the Florentine explorer Giovanni da Verrazzano (Italian: [dʒoˈvanni da (v)verratˈtsaːno]) was the first European to explore the Atlantic coast of North America between Florida and New Brunswick in 1524. The geographic information derived from this voyage significantly influenced 16th-century cartographers. Despite his discoveries, Verrazzano's reputation did not proliferate as much as other explorers of that era. For example, Verrazzano gave the European name Francesca to the new land that he had seen, in accordance with contemporary practices, after the French king in whose name he sailed. That and other names he bestowed on features he discovered have not survived.

Verrazzano's reputation was particularly obscure in New York City, where the 1609 voyage of Henry Hudson on behalf of the Dutch Republic came to be regarded as the de facto start of European exploration of New York. It was only by a great effort in the 1950s and 1960s that Verrazzano's name and reputation were re-established as the European discoverer of the harbour, during an effort to name the newly built Narrows bridge after him.

The Italian explorer Amerigo Vespucci (Italian: [ameˈriːɡo veˈsputtʃi]) first demonstrated in about 1501 that the New World was not Asia as initially conjectured but a different continent (America is named after him). Between 1497 and 1504, Vespucci participated in at least two voyages of the Age of Discovery, first on behalf of Spain (1499–1500) and then for Portugal (1501–1502). In 1503 and 1505, two booklets were published under his name, containing colourful descriptions of these explorations and other alleged voyages. Both publications were extremely popular and widely read across much of Europe. Although historians still dispute the authorship and veracity of these accounts, at the time they were instrumental in raising awareness of the new discoveries and enhancing the reputation of Vespucci as an explorer and navigator.

Vespucci claimed to have understood, back in 1501 during his Portuguese expedition, that Brazil was part of a fourth continent unknown to Europeans, which he called the "New World". The claim inspired cartographer Martin Waldseemüller to recognize Vespucci's accomplishments in 1507 by applying the Latinized form "America" for the first time to a map showing the New World. Other cartographers followed suit, and by 1538 the tradition of marking the name "America" on maps of the newly discovered continents was secure. It is unknown whether Vespucci was ever aware of these honours. In 1505, he was made a subject of Castile by royal decree and in 1508, he was appointed to the newly created position of piloto mayor (master navigator) for Spain's Casa de Contratación (House of Trade) in Seville, a post he held until his death in 1512.

A number of Italian navigators and explorers in the employ of Spain and France were involved in exploring and mapping their territories, and in establishing settlements; but this did not lead to the permanent presence of Italians in America. In 1539 Marco da Nizza explored the territory that later became the states of Arizona and New Mexico.

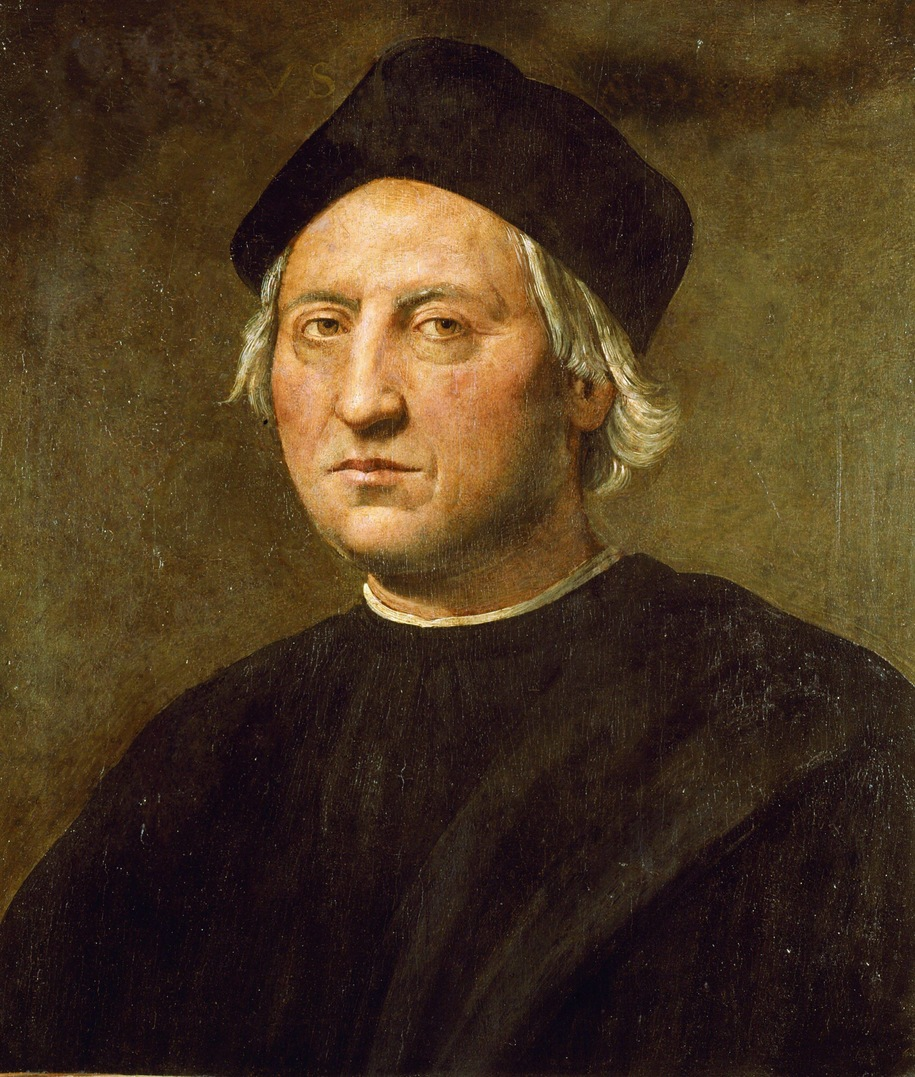
Christopher Columbus

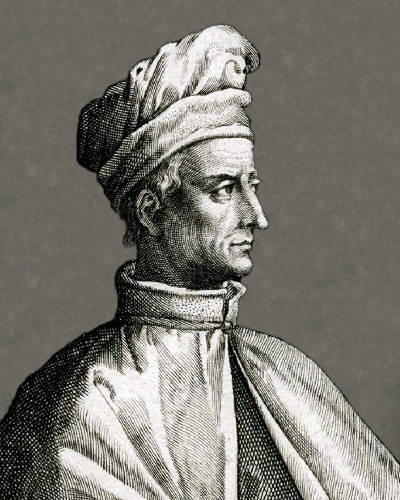
Amerigo Vespucci

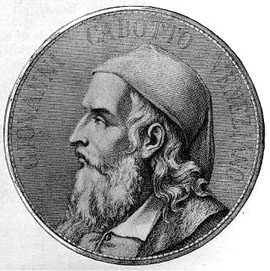
John Cabot

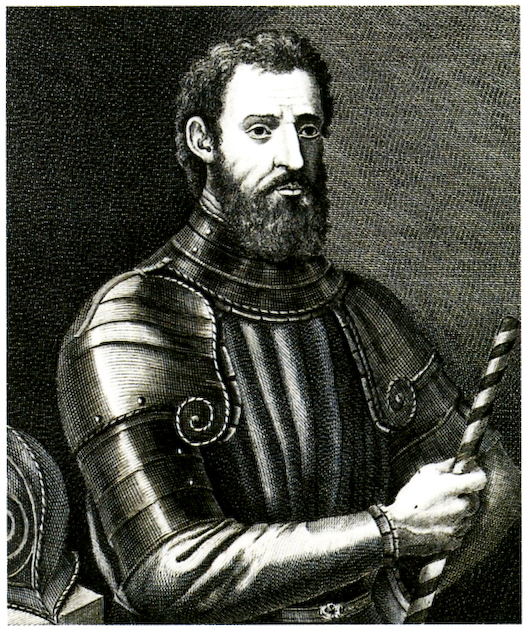
Giovanni da Verrazzano

Peter Martyr d'Anghiera was an Italian-born historian of Spain and of the discoveries of her representatives during the Age of Exploration. He wrote the first accounts of explorations in Central and South America in a series of letters and reports, grouped in the original Latin publications of 1511–1530 into sets of ten chapters called "decades". His Decades are thus of great value in the history of geography and discovery. His De Orbe Novo (published 1530; "On the New World") describes the first contacts of Europeans and Native Americans and contains, for example, the first European reference to India rubber.

Richard Hakluyt was an English writer, and is principally remembered for his efforts in promoting and supporting the settlement of North America by the English through his works, notably Divers Voyages Touching the Discoverie of America (1582) and The Principal Navigations, Voiages, Traffiques and Discoueries of the English Nation (1598–1600).

=== European expansion ===
Although Europe is the world's second-smallest continent in terms of area, it has a very long coastline, and has arguably been influenced more by its maritime history than any other continent. Europe is uniquely situated between several navigable seas and intersected by navigable rivers running into them in a way which greatly facilitated the influence of maritime traffic and commerce.

When the carrack and then the caravel were developed by the Portuguese, European thoughts returned to the fabled East. These explorations have a number of causes. Monetarists believe the main reason the Age of Exploration began was because of a severe shortage of bullion in Europe. The European economy was dependent on gold and silver currency, but low domestic supplies had plunged much of Europe into a recession. Another factor was the centuries long conflict between the Iberians and the Muslims to the south. The eastern trade routes were controlled by the Ottoman Empire after the Turks took control of Constantinople in 1453, and they barred Europeans from those trade routes. The ability to outflank the Muslim states of North Africa was seen as crucial to their survival. At the same time, the Iberians learnt much from their Arab neighbours. The carrack and caravel both incorporated the Mediterranean lateen sail that made ships far more manoeuvrable. It was also through the Arabs that Ancient Greek geography was rediscovered, for the first time giving European sailors some idea of the shape of Africa and Asia.

=== European colonization ===
In 1492, Christopher Columbus reached the Americas, after which European exploration and colonization rapidly expanded. The post-1492 era is known as the Columbian Exchange period. The first conquests were made by the Spanish, who quickly conquered most of South and Central America and large parts of North America. The Portuguese took Brazil. The British, French and Dutch conquered islands in the Caribbean Sea, many of which had already been conquered by the Spanish or depopulated by disease. Early European colonies in North America included Spanish Florida, the British settlements in Virginia and New England, French settlements in Quebec and Louisiana, and Dutch settlements in New Netherlands. Denmark–Norway revived its former colonies in Greenland from the 18th until the 20th century, and also colonised a few of the Virgin Islands.

World colonization, 1492–2007

From its very outset, Western colonialism was operated as a joint public–private venture. Columbus' voyages to the Americas were partially funded by Italian investors, but whereas the Spanish state maintained a tight rein on trade with its colonies (by law, the colonies could only trade with one designated port in the mother country, and treasure was brought back in special convoys), the English, French and Dutch granted what were effectively trade monopolies to joint-stock companies such as the British East India Company, the Dutch East India Company and the Hudson's Bay Company.

In the exploration of Africa, there was a proliferation of conflicting European claims to African territory. By the 15th century, Europeans explored the African coast in search of a water route to India. These expeditions were mostly conducted by the Portuguese, who had been given papal authority to exploit all non-Christian lands of the Eastern Hemisphere. The Europeans set up coastal colonies to purchase or abduct slaves for the Atlantic slave trade, but the interior of the continent remained unexplored until the 19th century. This was a cumulative period that resulted in European colonial rule in Africa and altered the future of the African continent.

Imperialism in Asia traces its roots back to the late 15th century with a series of voyages that sought a sea passage to India in the hope of establishing direct trade between Europe and Asia in spices. Before 1500 European economies were largely self-sufficient, only supplemented by minor trade with Asia and Africa. Within the next century, however, European and Asian economies were slowly becoming integrated through the rise of new global trade routes; and the early thrust of European political power, commerce, and culture in Asia gave rise to a growing trade in lucrative commodities—a key development in the rise of today's modern world capitalist economy. European colonies in India were set up by several European nations beginning at the beginning of the 16th century. Rivalry between reigning European powers saw the entry of the Dutch, British and French among others.

=== Ming maritime world ===
==== Zheng He voyages ====
In the 15th century, before the European Age of Discovery began, the Chinese Ming dynasty carried out a maritime operation that, like the European's late expeditions, was primarily carried out to expand power, increase trade, and in some instances forcibly subdue local populations.

In 1405 Zheng He, a Muslim eunuch, was ordered by the Ming dynasty to lead a fleet of over 27,000 sailors and anywhere between 62 and 300 ships, beginning a period of expedition which would last 33 years. During his seven voyages, Zheng He visited over 30 countries spread out across the Indian Ocean. Under Emperor Yongle, this naval undertaking served primarily as a deliverer of letters demanding tribute and allegiance to the middle kingdom; gifts were the first approach to gaining a country's favor, but if circumstances required it Zheng He's fleet would resort to violence. The result was a successful connection to 48 new tribute states and an influx of over 180 new trade goods; many were gifts. These expeditions expanded China's diplomatic supremacy of the region and strengthened their economic ties in the area. When these expeditions ended, China's maritime strength diminished and lacked a powerful navy for centuries after.

==== Other Ming maritime activity ====
The end of the imperially-sponsored voyages, however, in no way meant that Ming people no longer put to sea. Merchants, pirates, fishermen, and others depended on boats and ships for their livelihood, and immigration to Southeast Asia, both permanent and temporary, continued throughout Ming times. Because Chinese and Chinese immigrants to Southeast Asia were the main players in commerce in the South China Sea, Chinese merchants and ships were critical to the Spanish trade in Manila. Not only did Chinese merchants supply the goods the Spanish bought with their American silver, but Chinese shipbuilders built the famous galleons that carried those goods and that silver back and forth across the Pacific twice a year.

=== Clipper route ===
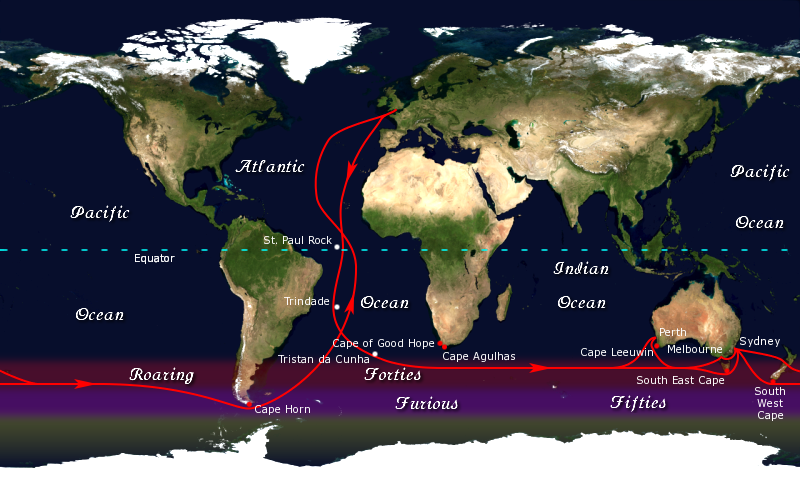
The Clipper route followed by ships sailing between England and Australia/New Zealand.

During this time, the clipper route was established by clipper ships between Europe and the Far East, Australia and New Zealand. The route ran from west to east through the Southern Ocean, in order to make use of the strong westerly winds of the Roaring Forties. Many ships and sailors were lost in the heavy conditions along the route, particularly at Cape Horn, which the clippers had to round on their return to Europe. Cape Horn was discovered by Sir Francis Drake in September 1578 in the course of his circumnavigation of the world. This discovery went unused for some time, as ships continued to use the known passage through the Strait of Magellan. By the early 17th century, the Dutch merchant Jacob le Maire, together with navigator Willem Schouten, set off to investigate Drake's suggestion of a route to the south of Tierra del Fuego. At the time it was discovered, the Horn was believed to be the southernmost point of Tierra del Fuego; the unpredictable violence of weather and sea conditions in the Drake Passage made exploration difficult, and it was only in 1624 that the Horn was discovered to be an island. It is an interesting testament to the difficulty of conditions there that Antarctica, only 650 kilometres (400 mi) away across the Drake Passage, was discovered as recently as 1820, despite the passage having been used as a major shipping route for 200 years. The clipper route fell into commercial disuse with the introduction of steam ships, and the opening of the Suez and Panama Canals.

=== End of exploration ===
The Age of Exploration is generally said to have ended in the early 17th century. By this time European vessels were well enough built and their navigators competent enough to travel to virtually anywhere on the planet. Exploration, of course, continued. The Arctic and Antarctic seas were not explored until the 19th century.

== Age of Sail ==
The Age of Sail originates from ancient seafaring exploration, during the rise of ancient civilizations. Including Mesopotamia, the Far East and the Cradle of Civilization, the Arabian Sea has been an important marine trade route since the era of the coastal sailing vessels from possibly as early as the third millennium BC, certainly the late second millennium BC up to and including the later days of Age of Sail. By the time of Julius Caesar, several well-established combined land-sea trade routes depended upon water transport through the Sea around the rough inland terrain features to its north. These routes usually began in the Far East with transshipment via historic Bharuch (Bharakuccha), traversed past the inhospitable coast of today's Iran then split around Hadhramaut into two streams north into the Gulf of Aden and thence into the Levant, or south into Alexandria via Red Sea ports such as Axum. Each major route involved transhipping to pack animal caravans, travel through desert country and risk of bandits and extortionate tolls by local potentiates. Southern coastal route past the rough country in the southern Arabian peninsula (Yemen and Oman today) was significant, and the Egyptian Pharaohs built several shallow canals to service the trade, one more or less along the route of today's Suez canal, and another from the Red Sea to the Nile River, both shallow works that were swallowed up by huge sand storms in antiquity.

In the modern western countries, the European "Age of Sail" is the period in which international trade and naval warfare were both dominated by sailing ships. The age of sail mostly coincided with the Age of Discovery, from the 15th to the 18th century. After the 17th century, English naval maps stopped using the term of British Sea for the English Channel. From 15th to the 18th centuries, the period saw square rigged sailing ships carry European settlers to many parts of the world in one of the most important human migrations in recorded history. This period was marked by extensive exploration and colonization efforts on the part of European kingdoms. The sextant, developed in the 18th century, made more accurate charting of nautical position possible.

=== Notable individuals ===
The Battle of Lepanto in 1571

Juan of Austria was a military leader whose most famous victory was in the naval Battle of Lepanto in 1571. Philip had appointed Juan to command the naval forces of the Holy League which was pitted against the Ottoman Empire. Juan, by dint of leadership ability and charisma, was able to unite this disparate coalition and inflict a historic defeat upon the Ottomans and their corsair allies in the Battle of Lepanto. His role in the battle is commemorated in the poem "Lepanto" by G. K. Chesterton.

Maarten Tromp was an officer and later admiral in the Dutch navy. In 1639, during the Dutch struggle for independence from Spain, Tromp defeated a large Spanish fleet bound for Flanders at the Battle of the Downs, marking the end of Spanish naval power. In a preliminary battle, the action of 18 September 1639, Tromp was the first fleet commander known to deliberately use line of battle tactics. His flagship in this period was Aemilia. In the First Anglo-Dutch War of 1652–1653 Tromp commanded the Dutch fleet in the battles of Dungeness, Portland, the Gabbard and Scheveningen. In the last of these, he was killed by a sharpshooter in the rigging of William Penn's ship. His acting flag captain, Egbert Bartholomeusz Kortenaer, on Brederode kept up fleet morale by not lowering Tromp's standard, pretending Tromp was still alive.

Cornelis Tromp was a Commander in Chief of the Dutch and Danish navy. In 1656 he participated in the relief of Gdańsk (Danzig). In 1658 it was discovered he had used his ships to trade in luxury goods; as a result he was fined and not allowed to have an active command until 1662. Just before the Second Anglo-Dutch War he was promoted to vice-admiral on 29 January 1665; at the Battle of Lowestoft he prevented total catastrophe by taking over fleet command to allow the escape of the larger part of the fleet. In 1676 he became Admiral-General of the Danish navy and Knight in the Order of the Elephant. He defeated the Swedish navy in the Battle of Öland, his only victory as a fleet commander.

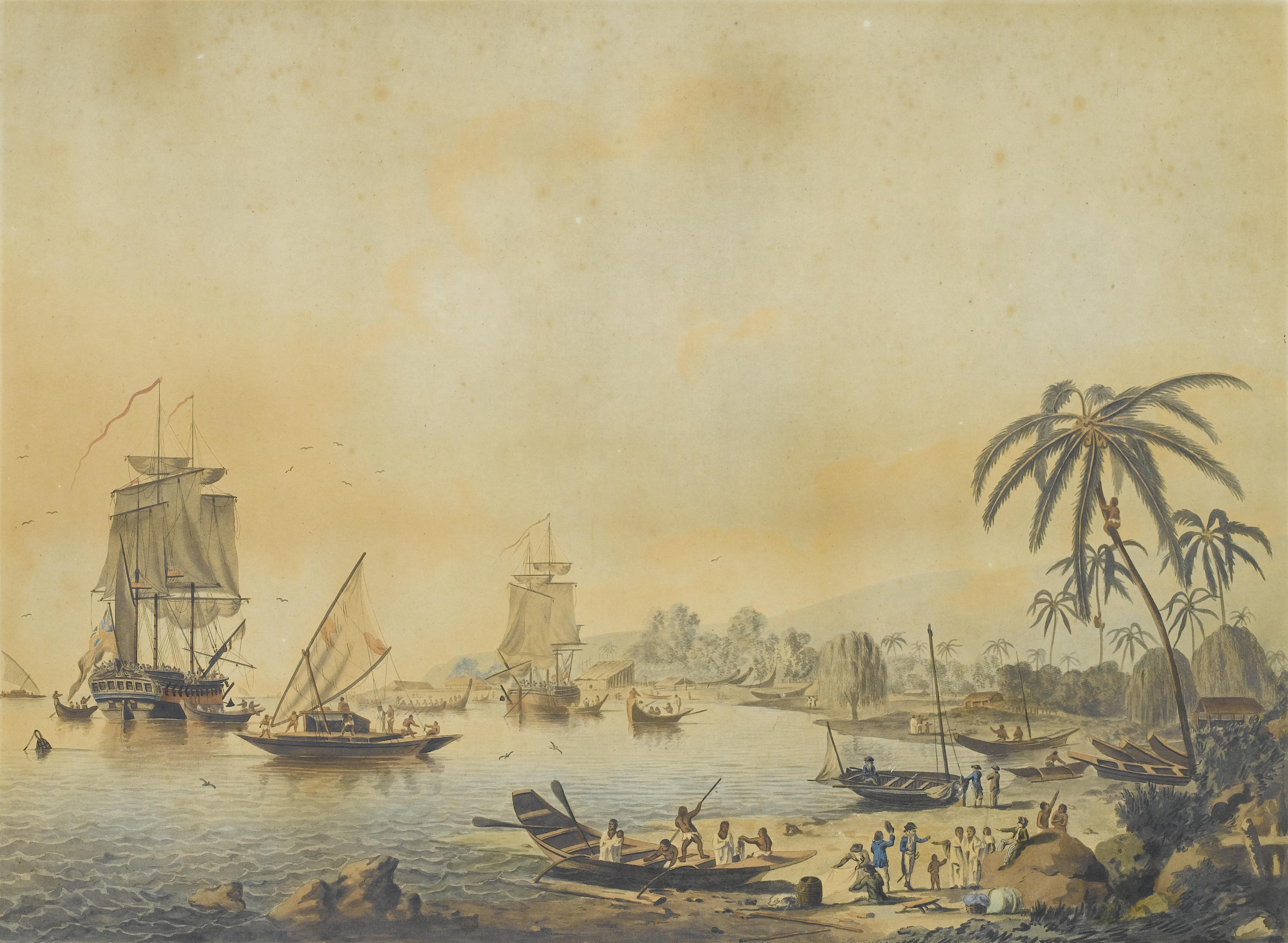
Resolution and Discovery in Tahiti, commanded by James Cook

Charles Hardy was a British naval officer and colonial governor. He was appointed governor and commander-in-chief of the British colony of Newfoundland in 1744. In 1758, he and James Wolfe attacked French posts around the mouth of the St. Lawrence River and destroyed all of the French fishing stations along the northern shores of what is now New Brunswick and along the Gaspé Peninsula.

Augustus Keppel, 1st Viscount Keppel was a British admiral who held sea commands during the Seven Years' War and the War of American Independence. During the final years of the latter conflict he served as First Lord of the Admiralty. During the Seven Years' War he saw constant service. He was in North America in 1755, on the coast of France in 1756, was detached on a cruise to reduce the French settlements on the west coast of Africa in 1758, and his ship Torbay (74) was the first to get into action in the Battle of Quiberon Bay in 1759. In 1757 he had formed part of the court martial which had condemned Admiral Byng, but was active among those who endeavoured to secure a pardon for him; but neither he nor those who had acted with him could produce any serious reason why the sentence should not be carried out. When Spain joined France in 1762 he was sent as second in command with Sir George Pocock in the expedition which took Havana. His health suffered from the fever which carried off an immense proportion of the soldiers and sailors, but the £25,000 of prize money which he received freed him from the unpleasant position of younger son of a family ruined by the extravagance of his father.

Edward Hawke, 1st Baron Hawke was a naval officer of the Royal Navy. During the War of the Austrian Succession he was promoted to rear admiral. In the Seven Years' War, Hawke replaced Admiral John Byng as commander in the Mediterranean in 1756.

Richard Howe, 1st Earl Howe was a British admiral. During the rebellion in North America, Howe was known to be sympathetic to the colonists – he had in prior years sought the acquaintance of Benjamin Franklin, who was a friend of Howe's sister, a popular lady in London society. During his career, Howe displayed a tactical uncommon originality. His performance was unexcelled even by Nelson, who, like Howe's other successors, was served by more highly trained squadrons and benefitted from Howe's example.

Horatio Nelson, 1st Viscount Nelson was a British admiral famous for his participation in the Napoleonic Wars, most notably in the Battle of Trafalgar, a decisive British victory in the war, where he was killed. Nelson was noted for his considerable ability to inspire and bring out the best in his men, to the point that it gained a name: "The Nelson Touch". His actions during these wars meant that before and after his death he was revered like few military figures have been throughout British history. Alexander Davison was a contemporary and close friend of Horatio Nelson. Davison is responsible for several acts that glorified Nelson's public image. These included the creation of a medal commemorating the victory at the Battle of the Nile and the creation of the Nelson Memorial at his estate at Swarland, Northumberland. As a close friend of the Admiral he acted as an intermediary when Nelson's marriage to his wife, Frances Nelson fell apart due in large part to his affair with Emma Hamilton.

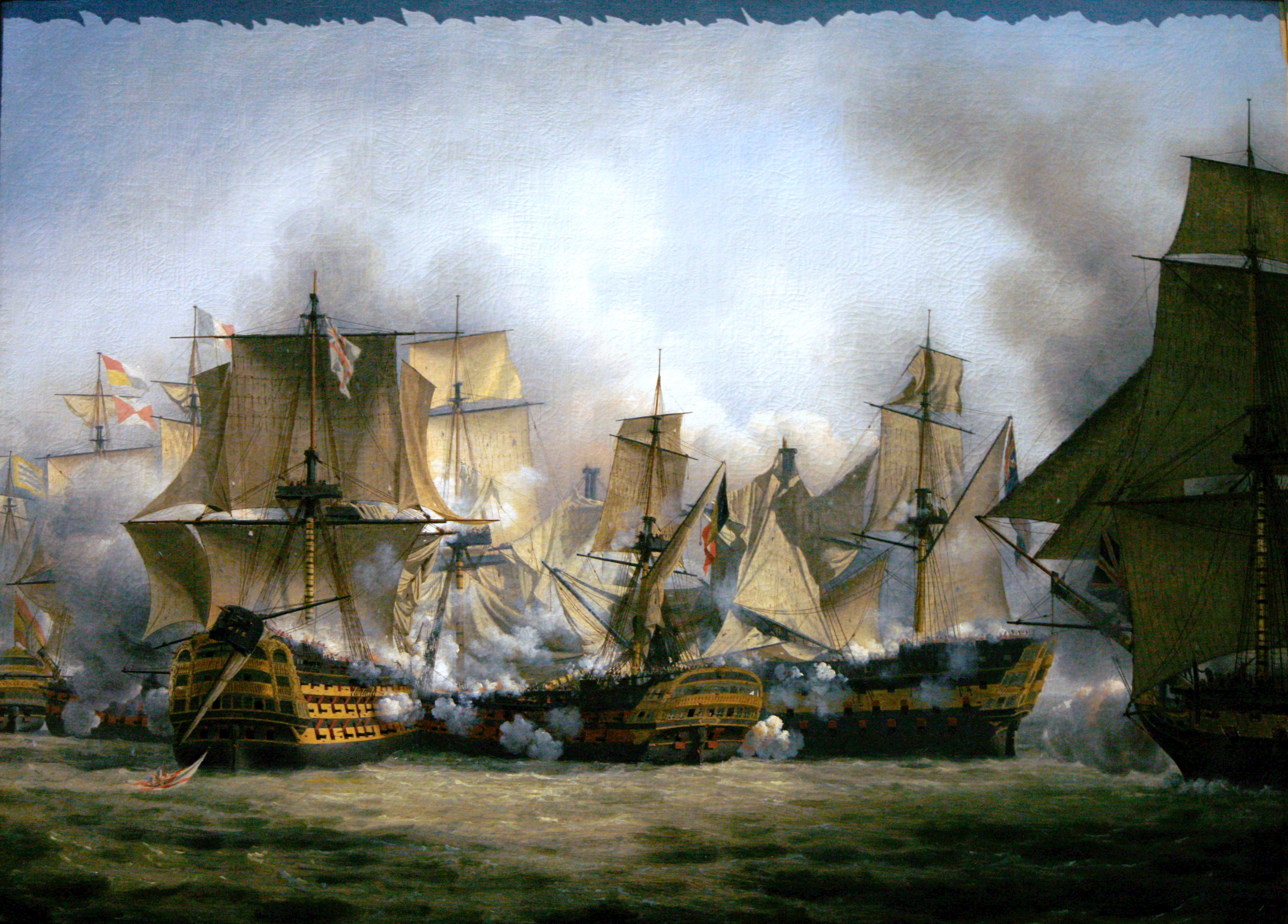
The Battle of Trafalgar in 1805

Hyde Parker in 1778 was engaged in the Savannah expedition, and in the following year his ship was wrecked on the hostile Cuban coast. His men, however, entrenched themselves, and were in the end brought off safely. Parker was with his father at the Dogger Bank, and with Richard Howe in the two actions in the Straits of Gibraltar. In 1793, having just become rear admiral, he served under Samuel Hood at Toulon and in Corsica, and two years later, now a vice admiral, he took part, under Lord Hotham, in the indecisive fleet actions on 13 March 1795 and the 13 July 1795. From 1796 to 1800 he was in command at Jamaica and ably conducted the operations in the West Indies.

Edward Pellew, 1st Viscount Exmouth was a British naval officer who fought during the American War of Independence, the French Revolutionary, and the Napoleonic Wars. Pellew is remembered as an officer and a gentleman of great courage and leadership, earning his land and titles through courage, leadership and skill – serving as a paradigm of the versatility and determination of Naval Officers during the Napoleonic Wars.

Antoine de Sartine, a French statesman, was the Secretary of State for the Navy under King Louis XVI. Sartine inherited a strong French Navy, resurrected by Choiseul after the disasters of the Seven Years' War when France lost Canada, Louisiana, and India, and which would later defeat the British Navy in the War of American Independence.

James Saumarez, 1st Baron de Saumarez was an admiral of the British Royal Navy, notable for his victory at the Battle of Algeciras. In 1801 he was raised to the rank of Rear-Admiral of the Blue, was created a baronet, and received the command of a small squadron which was destined to watch the movements of the Spanish fleet at Cádiz. Between 6 and 12 July he performed a brilliant piece of service, in which after a first repulse at Algeciras he routed a much superior combined force of French and Spanish ships at the Battle of Algeciras. For his services Saumarez received the order of the Bath and the freedom of the City of London.

David Porter during the First Barbary War (1801–1807) was 1st lieutenant of USS Enterprise, USS New York and USS Philadelphia and was taken prisoner when Philadelphia ran aground in Tripoli harbor 31 October 1803. After his release 3 June 1805 he remained in the Mediterranean as acting captain of USS Constitution and later captain of Enterprise. He was in charge of the naval forces at New Orleans 1808–1810. As commander of USS Essex in the War of 1812, Captain Porter achieved fame by capturing the first British warship of the conflict, HMS Alert, 13 August 1812 as well as several merchantmen. In 1813 he sailed Essex around Cape Horn and cruised in the Pacific warring on British whalers. On 28 March 1814 Porter was forced to surrender off Valparaíso after an unequal contest with the frigates HMS Phoebe and HMS Cherub and only when his ship was too disabled to offer any resistance.

=== Spanish and English Armadas ===
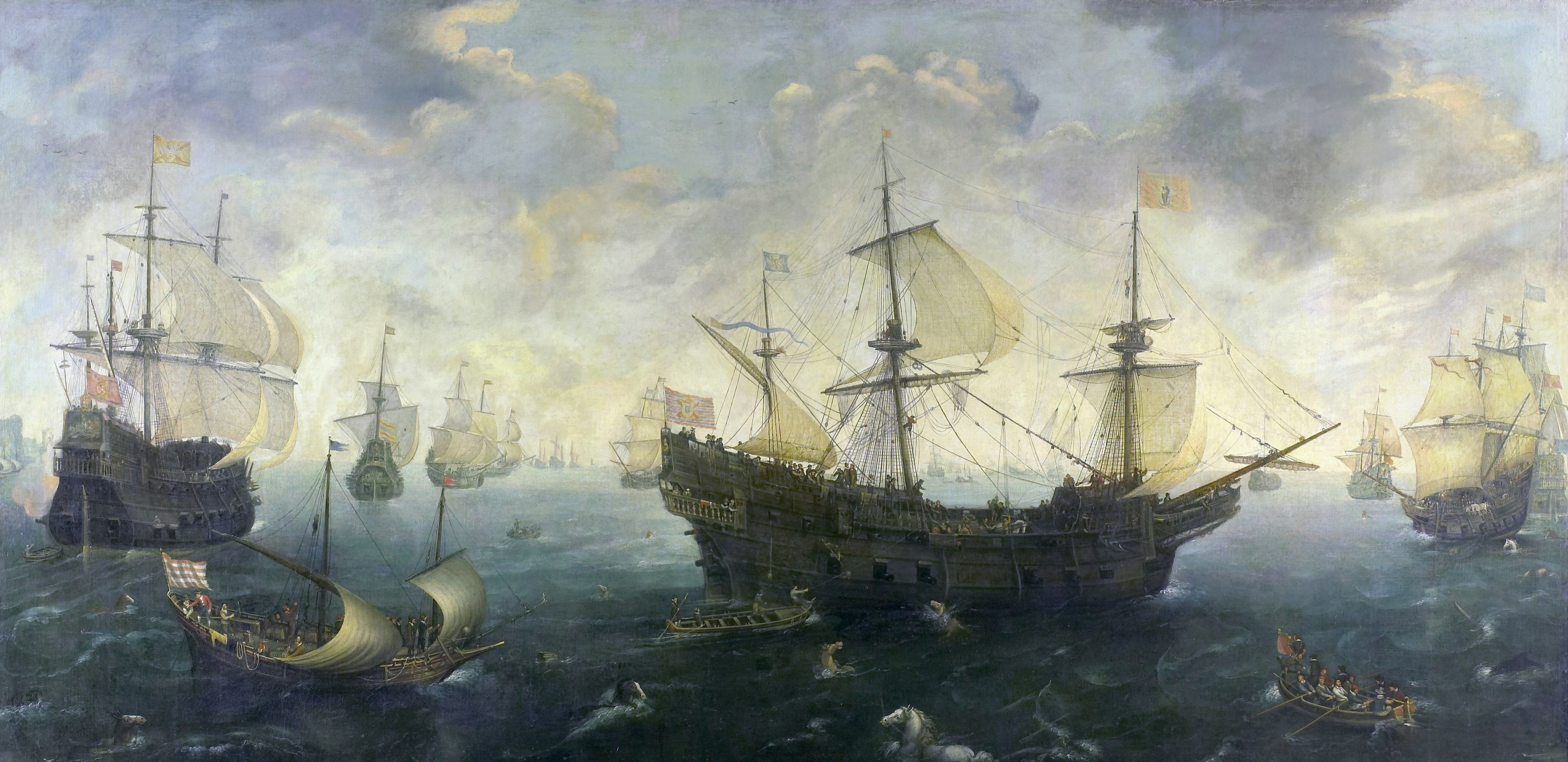
The Spanish Armada off the English coast

The Spanish Armada was the Spanish fleet that sailed against England under the command of the Duke of Medina Sidona in 1588. The Spanish Armada was sent by King Philip II of Spain, who had been king consort of England until the death of his wife Mary I of England thirty years earlier. The purpose of the expedition was to escort the Duke of Parma's army of tercios from the Spanish Netherlands across the North Sea for a landing in south-east England. Once the army had suppressed English support for the United Provinces—part of the Spanish Netherlands—it was intended to cut off attacks against Spanish possessions in the New World and the Atlantic treasure fleets. It was also hoped to reverse the Protestant revolution in England, and to this end the expedition was supported by Pope Sixtus V, with the promise of a subsidy should it make land. The command of the fleet was originally entrusted to Alvaro de Bazan, a highly experienced naval commander who died a few months before the fleet sailed from Lisbon in May 1588.

The Spanish Armada consisted of about 130 warships and converted merchant ships. After forcing its way up the English Channel, it was attacked by a fleet of 200 English ships, assisted by the Dutch navy, in the North Sea at Gravelines off the coastal border between France and the Spanish Netherlands. A fire-ship attack drove the Armada ships from their safe anchorage, and in the ensuing battle the Spanish abandoned their rendezvous with Parma's army.

The Spanish Armada was blown north up the east coast of England and in a hasty strategic move, attempted a return to Spain by sailing around Scotland and out into the Atlantic, past Ireland. But very severe weather destroyed a portion of the fleet, and more than 24 vessels were wrecked on the north and western coasts of Ireland, with the survivors having to seek refuge in Scotland. Of the Spanish Armada's initial complement of vessels, about 50 did not return to Spain. However, the loss to Philip's Royal Navy was comparatively small: only seven ships failed to return, and of these only three were lost to enemy action.

The English Armada was a fleet of warships sent to the Iberian coast by Queen Elizabeth I in 1589, during the Anglo-Spanish War (1585–1604). It was led by Sir Francis Drake as admiral and Sir John Norreys as general, and failed in its attempt to drive home the advantage England had won upon the defeat and dispersal of the Spanish Armada in the previous year. With the opportunity to strike a decisive blow against the weakened Spanish lost, the failure of the expedition further depleted the English treasury that had been so carefully restored during the long reign of Elizabeth I. The war was very costly to both sides, and Spain itself, also fighting France and the United Provinces, had to default on its debt repayments in 1596, following the Anglo-Dutch capture of Cádiz. The fortunes of the various parties to this complicated conflict fluctuated until the Treaty of London in 1604, when a peace was agreed.

Spain's rebuilt navy had quickly recovered and exceeded its pre-Armada dominance of the sea, until defeats by the Dutch fifty years later marked the beginning of its decline. With the peace, the English were able to consolidate their hold on Ireland and make a concerted effort to establish colonies in North America.

=== North American maritime ===
The maritime history of the United States starts in the modern sense with the first successful English colony established in 1607, on the James River at Jamestown. It languished for decades until a new wave of settlers arrived in the late 17th century and set up commercial agriculture based on tobacco. The connection between the American colonies and Europe, with shipping as its cornerstone, would continue to grow unhindered for almost two hundred years.

The Continental Navy was formed during the American Revolution in 1774–1775. Through the efforts of the Continental Navy's apparent patron, John Adams and vigorous congressional support in the face of stiff opposition, the fleet cumulatively became relatively substantial when considering the limitations imposed upon the Patriot supply poole. The "Six original United States frigates" were the first United States frigates of the United States Navy, first authorized by the Congress with the Naval Act of 1794 on March 27, 1794, at a cost of $688,888.82.

John Paul Jones was America's first well-known naval hero in the American Revolutionary War. John Paul adopted the alias John Jones when he fled to his brother's home in Fredericksburg, Virginia in 1773 in order to avoid the hangman's noose in Tobago after an incident when he was accused of murdering a sailor under his command. He began using the name John Paul Jones as his brother suggested during the start of the American Revolution. Though his naval career never rose above the rank of captain in the Continental Navy after his victory over HMS Serapis with the frigate USS Bonhomme Richard, John Paul Jones remains the first genuine American naval hero, and a highly regarded battle commander.

Jonathan Haraden was a privateer during the American Revolution, being the first lieutenant of the sloop-of-war Tyrannicide, fourteen guns. On board for two years, he captured many prizes, becoming her commander in 1777.

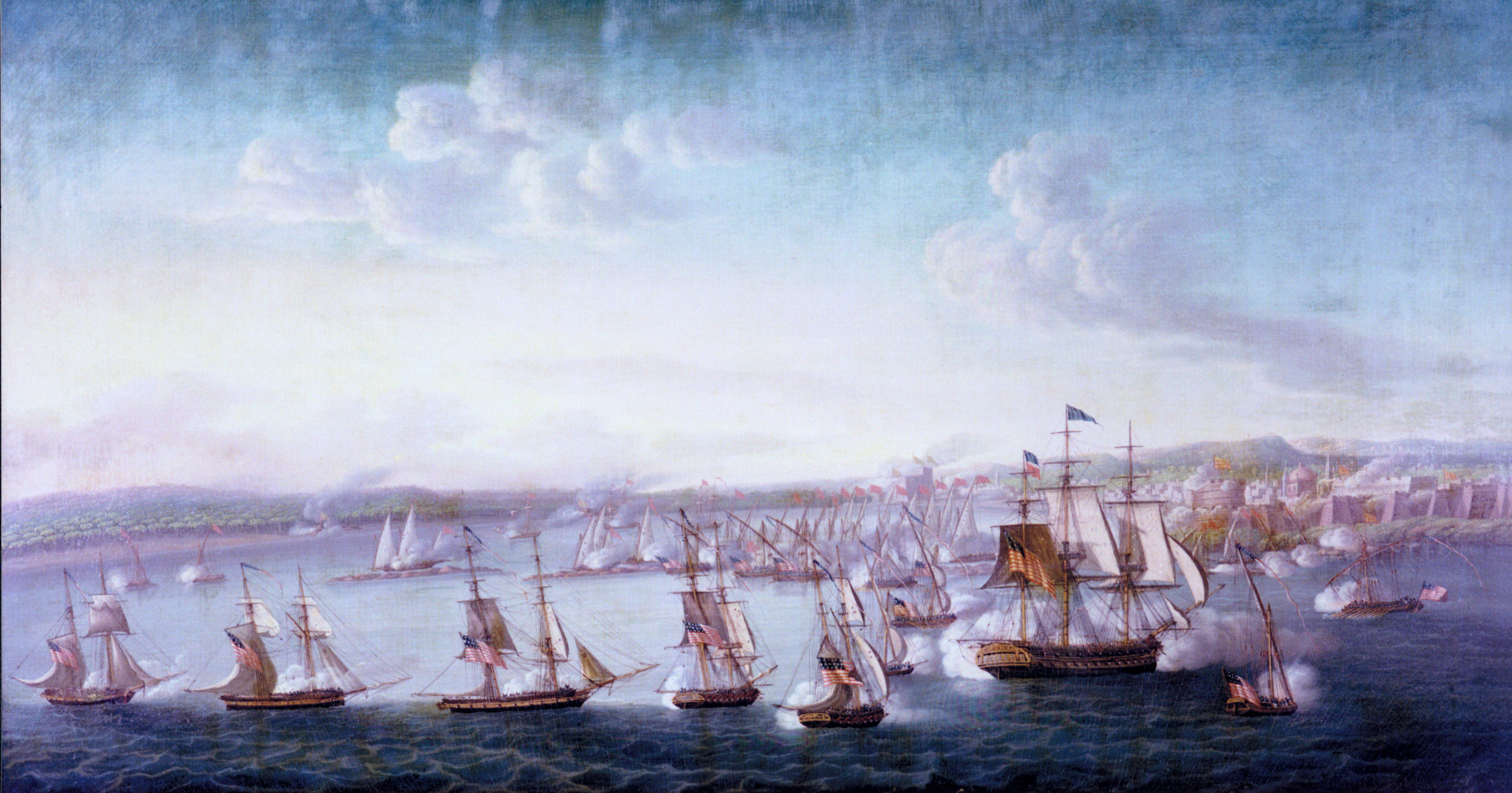
USS Constitution participating in the bombardment of Tripoli, 3 August 1804

George H. Preble was an American naval officer and writer, notable for his history of the flag of the United States and for taking the first photograph of the Fort McHenry flag that inspired "The Star-Spangled Banner". George entered the Navy as a midshipman on 10 December 1835, serving on USS United States until 1838.

Edward Preble was a U.S. naval officer. Following his Revolutionary War service, he was appointed 1st Lieutenant in the U.S. Navy. In January 1799, he assumed command of the 14-gun brig USS Pickering (6) and took her to the West Indies to protect American commerce during the Quasi-War with France. Commissioned Captain 7 June 1799, he took command of USS Essex in December and sailed in January 1800 for the Pacific to provide similar protective services for Americans engaged in the East Indies trade. Given command of the 3rd Squadron, with USS Constitution as his flagship, in 1803, he sailed for the Barbary coast and by October had promoted a treaty with Morocco and established a blockade off Tripoli in the First Barbary War.

=== Triangular trade ===
In the 17th, 18th, and 19th centuries a network of maritime trade formed in the Atlantic, connecting Europe, Africa, and the Americas through a triangular trade of African slaves, sugar/molasses, and rum. This maritime trade route would enrich Europe and the Americas while also pulling both deeper into the slave trade.

European merchants would buy slaves from African slavers, transporting these slaves to their sugar plantations in the Caribbeans, where the sugar/molasses they produced would be shipped to British North America and distilled into rum where it would be consumed in the colonies and sent to Europe. In some models of triangular trade, the Colonies take Europe's place, and the model of trade shifts to Slaves from Africa to the Caribbean, sugar and molasses go to New England, and the rum/other finished goods would be sold in Africa to get more slaves. Both of these models are not restricted to sugar trade; tobacco, cotton, and other plantation based raw materials take the place of sugar, and its derivatives.

=== Piracy in the Atlantic Ocean ===
During the Age of Discovery, key trade routes to the new world formed in the Caribbean and the Atlantic Ocean. With this concentrated area of trade, piracy was a significant maritime hazard in the 16th, 17th and 18th centuries. Some nations would use pirates to sabotage their rivals, going as far as supplying and recognizing them as legitimate. Eventually, powers like the English and Dutch implemented strong anti-piracy tactics to strengthen their trade empires in the 18th century.

In the 16th and 17th century Caribbean, the trading of slaves, precious metals, and raw materials all fell prey to piracy. Pirates would raid forts, and attack ships at sea to get possession of merchants material wealth. In some cases, pirates would tie themselves to a maritime power like the British and aid them by raiding rival nations like the Spanish and leaving British trade unmolested. In areas like Jamaica, some pirates were friendly with the British and would remain on the fringes of the colony. Some of these pirates were accepted by British colonial governors.

The English and Dutch had created extensive trade empires during the 17th and 18th century and saw pirates as a barrier to their continued growth. English began building a codification for piracy, which started a war against pirates that lasted from the 1670s ending in the 1720s. During this time the English would develop a ship called the Jamaica Sloops which were better at fending off piracy. In the late 1600s, the British began building up their navy and were able to put an end to most piracy by the 1720s violently, only isolated individual instances persisted.

=== Life at sea ===
Shipping, whether of cargo or passengers, is a business and the duties of a ship's captain reflect that. A captain's first duty was to the ship's owner and often the captain was encouraged to buy into the business with at least a one eighth share of the ship. A captain's second duty was to the cargo itself followed thirdly by the crew.

Crew were broken into two shifts that served four hour alternating watches often with all hands jointly serving the noon to 4:00 watch. American ships would commonly alternate watches with the addition of a two-hour dog watch. Work for sailors during their shift consisted primarily of general ship maintenance, washing, sanding, painting and repairs from general wear and tear or damage from storms. General ship operations like raising and lowering the anchor or furling and unfurling sails were done as needed. During the off shift hours, sailors could take care of their personal chores, washing and repairing clothes, sleeping and eating. Leisure time was often spent reading, writing in journals, playing an instrument, wood carving or fancy rope work. The American Seaman's Friend Society in New York City would loan boxes of books to ships for sailor's use.

Life aboard ship for immigrant travelers was much harsher and sometimes deadly. Ship owners would pack as many people as they could on board to maximize profits and little government oversight existed to ensure they received proper care during the voyage. British immigrant ships would often show less care to the passengers than criminals on prison ships to Australia. In 1803 the Passenger Vessel Act in Britain limited occupancy to one person per two tons of the ship's register. America issue stricter laws in 1819 limiting ships to a 1 to 5 ratio with fine levied should an overcrowded ship arrive at port. The Act of Feb. 1847 further increased the amount of space granted to passengers with the confiscation of a ship as the penalty for overcrowding.

=== War of 1812 ===
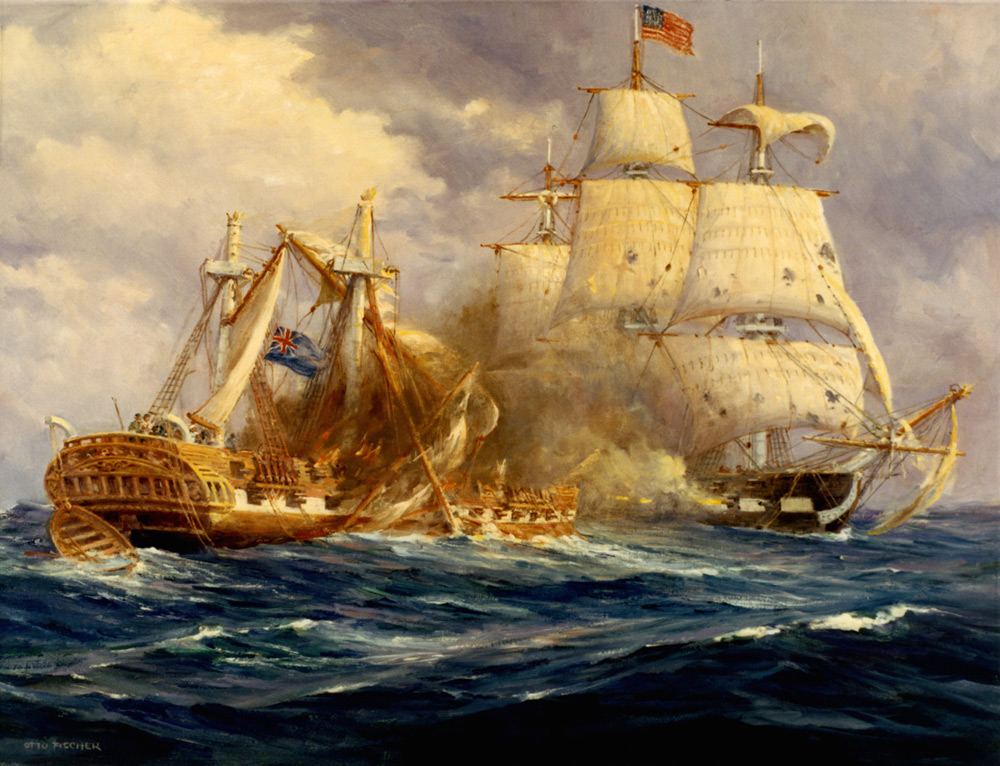
USS Constitution defeats HMS Guerriere

Stephen Decatur was an American naval officer notable for his heroism in the First Barbary War and the Second Barbary War and in the War of 1812. He was the youngest man to reach the rank of captain in the history of the U.S. Navy, and the first American celebrated as a national military hero who had not played a role in the American Revolution.

James Lawrence was an American naval hero. During the War of 1812, he commanded USS Chesapeake in a single-ship action against HMS Shannon (commanded by Philip Broke). He is probably best known today for his dying command "Don't give up the ship!", which is still a popular naval battle cry.

John H. Aulick was an officer in the United States Navy whose service extended from the War of 1812 to the end of the antebellum era. During the War of 1812, he served in USS Enterprise and took part in her battle with HMS Boxer on 4 September 1813. After that engagement ended in an American victory, Aulick served as prize master of the prize.

Thomas Macdonough was an early 19th-century American naval officer, most notably as commander of American naval forces on Lake Champlain during the War of 1812. One of the leading members of "Preble's Boys", a small group of naval officers who served during the First Barbary War, Macdonough's actions during the decisive Battle of Lake Champlain are often cited as a model of tactical preparation and execution.

=== Challenger Expedition ===
HMS Challenger, built in 1858, undertook the first global marine research expedition called the Challenger expedition in 1872. To enable her to probe the depths, all but two of Challenger's guns had been removed and her spars reduced to make more space available. Laboratories, extra cabins and a special dredging platform were installed. She was loaded with specimen jars, alcohol for preservation of samples, microscopes and chemical apparatus, trawls and dredges, thermometers and water sampling bottles, sounding leads and devices to collect sediment from the sea bed and great lengths of rope with which to suspend the equipment into the ocean depths. In all she was supplied with 181 miles (291 km) of Italian hemp for sounding, trawling and dredging. As the first true oceanographic cruise, the Challenger expedition laid the groundwork for an entire academic and research discipline.

=== End of the sail ===
Like most periodic eras the definition is inexact and close enough to serve as a general description. The age of sail runs roughly from the Battle of Lepanto in 1571, the last significant engagement in which oar-propelled galleys played a major role, to the Battle of Hampton Roads in 1862, in which the steam-powered CSS Virginia destroyed the sailing ships USS Cumberland and USS Congress, finally culminating with the advance of steam power, rendering sail power obsolete.

== Submarines ==
The history of submarines covers the historical chronology and facts related to submarines, the ships and boats which operate underwater. The modern underwater boat proposal was made by the Englishman William Bourne who designed a prototype submarine in 1578. Unfortunately for him these ideas never got beyond the planning stage. The first submersible proper to be actually built in modern times was built in 1620 by Cornelius Jacobszoon Drebbel, a Dutchman in the service of James I: it was based on Bourne's design. It was propelled by means of oars. The precise nature of the submarine type is a matter of some controversy; some claim that it was merely a bell towed by a boat. Two improved types were tested in the Thames between 1620 and 1624. In 1900, the U.S. navy was sold their first submarine by an Irish man named John Holland. From 1945 to 1955, tremendous changes were made for a great time when the first submarine was sent out to sail for the first time. The United States heavily depended on the submarines as a weapon of war when they were going to war with the Japanese.

== Age of steam ==
Steam was first used for propulsion in boats in the 1770s. The technology was used for sea travel from 1815, the year Pierre Andriel crossed the English Channel aboard the steamship Élise. The lengthy process of development ultimately produced economical steam engines, efficient external combustion heat engines that make use of the heat energy that exists in steam and converting it to mechanical work. In the last two decades of the 19th century, steam engines became the predominant form of propulsion for ships on all major routes.

=== Rise of steam vessels ===
Steamships gradually replaced sailing ships for commercial shipping in the 19th century – mostly through the latter part of the century. Paradoxically, steam supported sail, by providing tugs that could speed the arrival of ships that would otherwise often be windbound in anchorages close to their point of departure or destination. Larger sailing vessels could be built for bulk cargoes, as the availability of tugs meant that they could be docked efficiently. Steam "donkey engines" enabled these larger ships to work with smaller crews, being used for hoisting large sails and generally doing the heavy work on the ship.

Steam technology required a number of developmental steps to be able to compete with sail propulsion. Better materials and designs were needed for the boilers that ran at the higher pressures that allowed the increases in fuel efficiency from, first, compound engines (successfully used in SS Agamemnon (1865)) and then the triple expansion engine (starting with SS Aberdeen (1881)). The early practice of using sea water in boilers caused build up of salt in the boilers, so requiring regular cleaning on route. An interim solution was to regularly replace the water, to keep the salt content low – needing development of heat exchangers to recover the heat from old water. Ultimately condensers were designed to recover the fresh water used in later boilers. The inherent problems of paddlewheel propulsion were solved by the screw propeller, but that needed a functional stern gland and thrust bearing. Iron hulls overcame the structural issues of wooden-hulled steamers, but needed anti-fouling materials, or, failing that, dry docks in which hulls could be regularly cleaned. For steamships to operate around the world, coaling stations had to be provided for shipping routes and coal of the correct quality had to be transported there.

Whilst the technology steadily improved, sail remained the most economical choice for ship-owners who wished to make a good return on the capital they had invested. Steam was an option only for a limited number of trades until the 1860s, focusing on routes requiring scheduled services and/or reliable average speeds on a voyage – and only where the customer was prepared to pay the higher costs involved. Most of this was passenger transport and mail contracts. Only when the much more fuel efficient triple expansion engine had become common (by the 1890s) were all shipping routes fully commercially viable for steamers.

Ironclads are steam-propelled warships of the later 19th century, protected by iron or steel armor plates. The ironclad was developed as a result of the vulnerability of wooden warships to explosive or incendiary shells. The first ironclad battleship, Gloire, was launched by the French Navy in 1859; she prompted the British Royal Navy to start building ironclads. After the first clashes of ironclads took place during the American Civil War, it became clear that the ironclad had replaced the unarmored line-of-battle ship as the most powerful warship afloat.

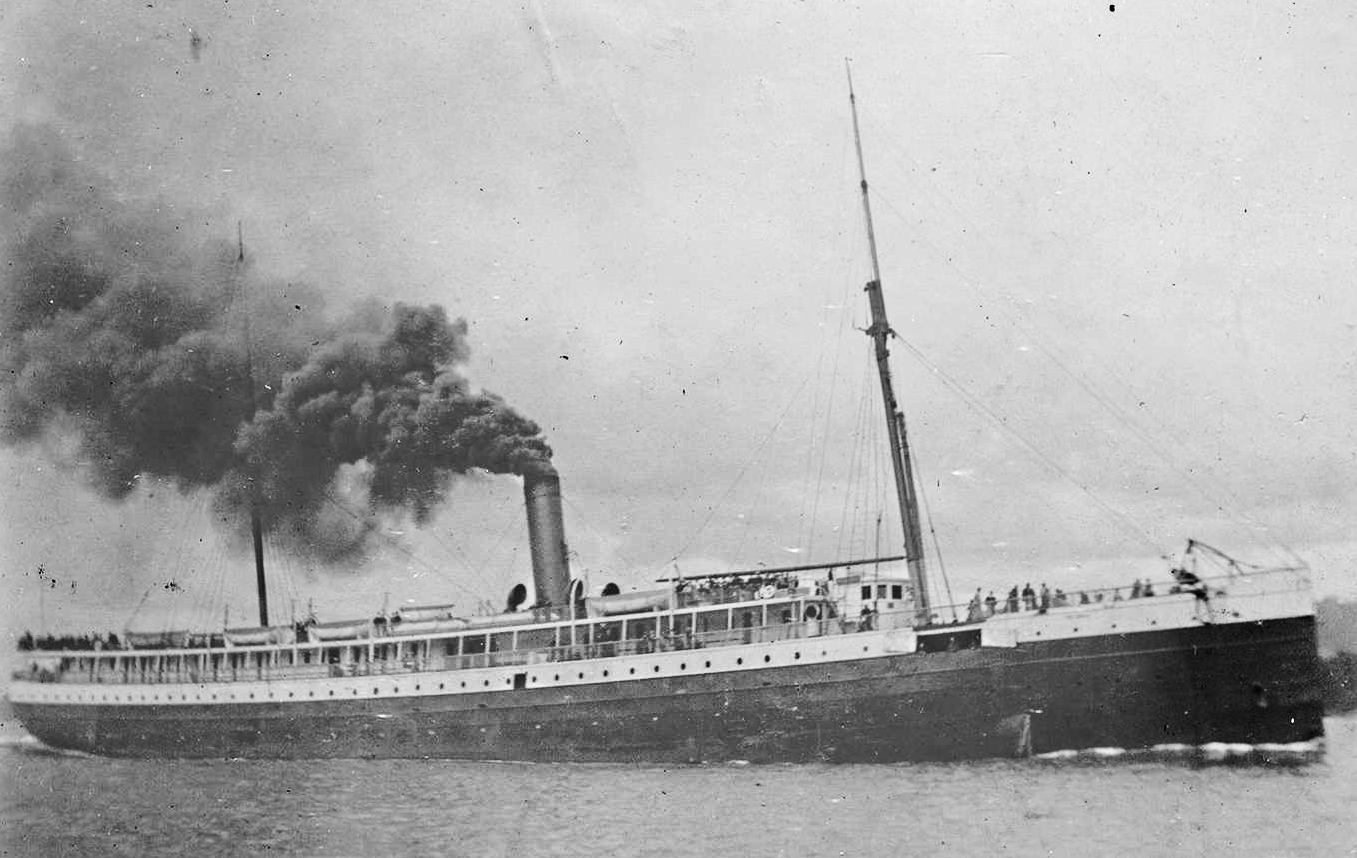
The American steamship Columbia was the first vessel to feature a dynamo and the first structure to utilize the incandescent light bulb.

In 1880, the American passenger steamer Columbia became the first ship to utilize the dynamo and incandescent light bulb. Furthermore, Columbia was the first structure besides Thomas Edison's laboratory in Menlo Park, New Jersey to use the incandescent light bulb.

=== Greek War of Independence ===
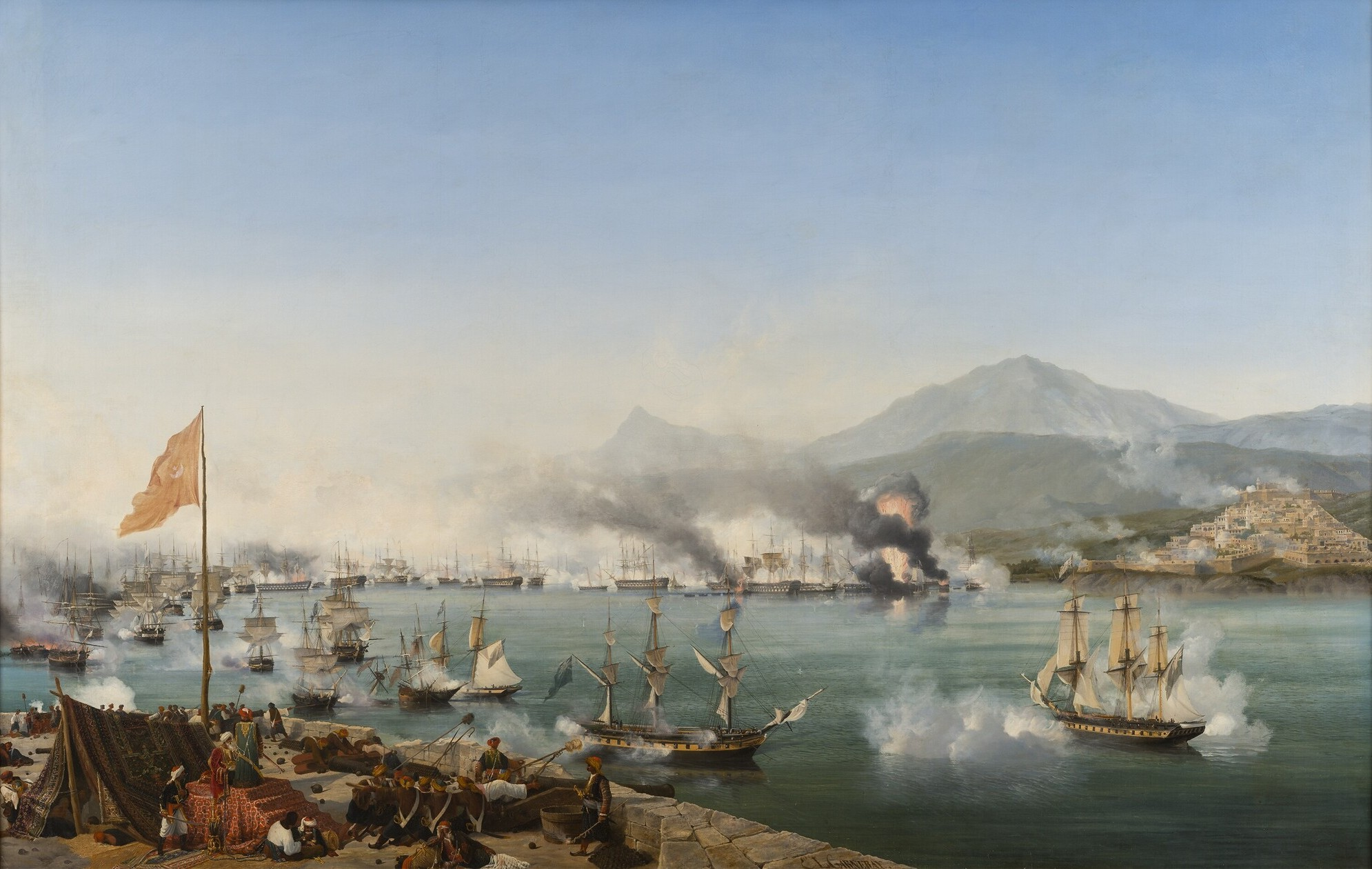
The Battle of Navarino, in October 1827, marked the effective end of Ottoman rule in Greece.

The Greek War of Independence was a successful war waged by the Greeks to win independence for Greece from the Ottoman Empire. Success at sea was vital for the Greeks. If they failed to counter the Ottoman Navy, it would be able to resupply the isolated Ottoman garrisons and land reinforcements from the Ottoman Empire's Asian provinces at will, crushing the rebellion. The Greeks decided to use fireships and found an effective weapon against the Ottoman vessels. Conventional naval actions were also fought, at which naval commanders like Andreas Miaoulis, Nikolis Apostolis, Iakovos Tombazis and Antonios Kriezis distinguished themselves. The early successes of the Greek fleet in direct confrontations with the Ottomans at Patras and Spetsai gave the crews confidence, and contributed greatly to the survival and success of the uprising in the Peloponnese. Despite victories at Samos and Gerontas, the Revolution was threatened with collapse until the intervention of the Great Powers in the Battle of Navarino in 1827. The Ottoman fleet was decisively defeated by the combined fleets of the Britain, France and the Russian Empire, effectively securing the independence of Greece.

=== 1850 to the end of the century ===
Most warships used steam propulsion until the advent of the gas turbine. Steamships were superseded by diesel-driven ships in the second half of the 20th century.

The Confederate States Navy (CSN) was the naval branch of the Confederate States armed forces established by an act of the Confederate Congress on February 21, 1861. It was responsible for Confederate naval operations during the American Civil War. The two major tasks of the Confederate Navy during the whole of its existence were the protection of Southern harbors and coastlines from outside invasion, and making the war costly for the North by attacking merchant ships and breaking the Union Blockade.

David Farragut was the first senior officer of the United States Navy during the American Civil War. He was the first rear admiral, vice admiral, and full admiral of the Navy. He is remembered in popular culture for his possibly apocryphal order at the Battle of Mobile Bay, usually paraphrased: "Damn the torpedoes, full speed ahead!".

Franklin Buchanan was an officer in the United States Navy who became an admiral in the Confederate Navy during the American Civil War. He was the captain of the ironclad CSS Virginia (formerly USS Merrimack) during the Battle of Hampton Roads in Virginia. He climbed to the top deck of Virginia and began furiously firing toward shore with a carbine as USS Congress was shelled. He soon was brought down by a sharpshooter's minie ball to the thigh. He would eventually recover from his leg wound. He never did get to command Virginia against USS Monitor. That honor went to Catesby ap Roger Jones. But Buchanan had handed the US Navy the worst defeat it would take until Pearl Harbor.

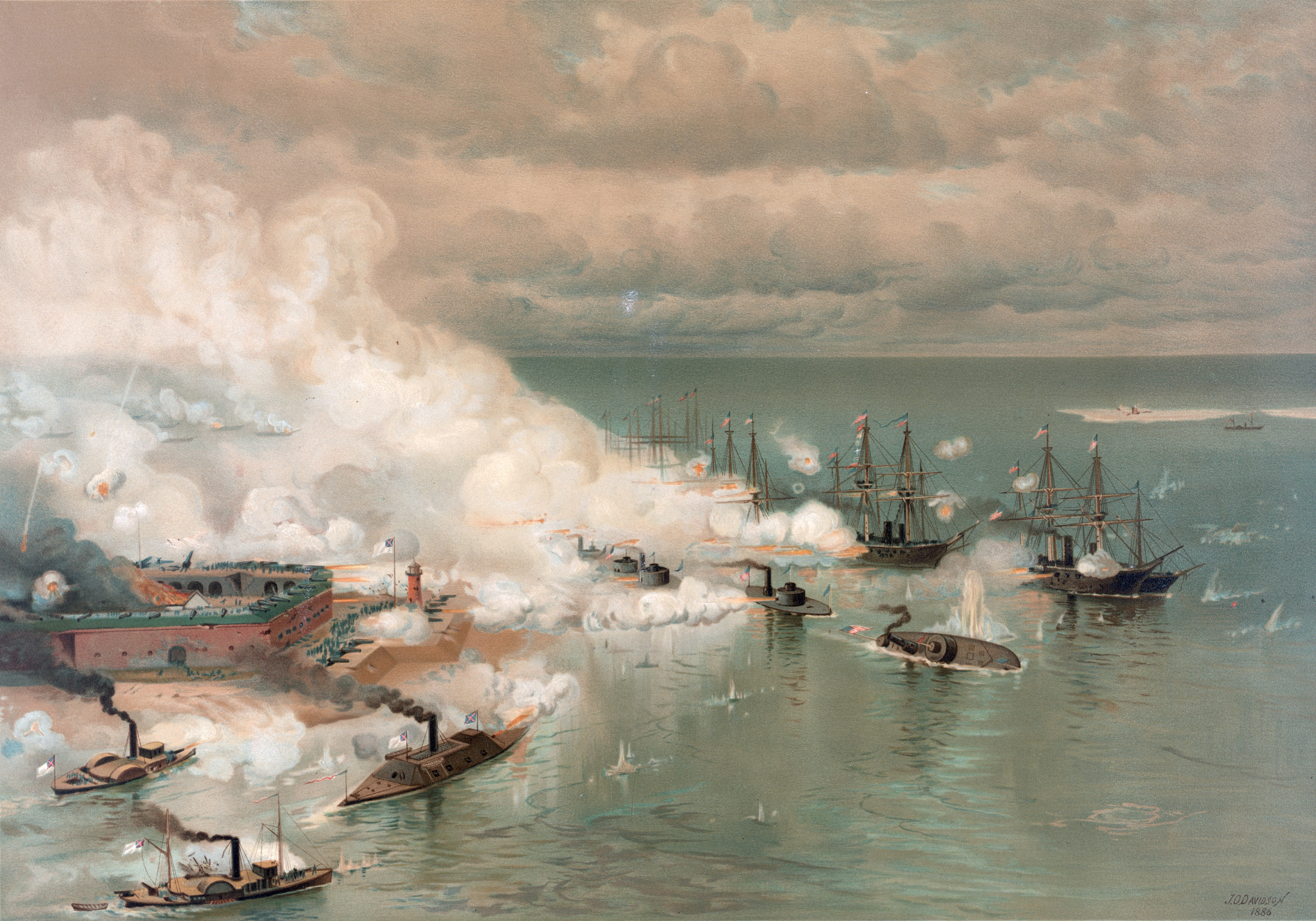
The Battle of Mobile Bay in 1864

Raphael Semmes was an officer in the United States Navy from 1826 to 1860 and the Confederate States Navy from 1860 to 1865. During the American Civil War he was captain of the famous commerce raider CSS Alabama, taking a record fifty-five prizes. Late in the war he was promoted to admiral and also served briefly as a brigadier general in the Confederate States Army.

In Italy, Carlo Pellion di Persano was an Italian admiral and commander of the Regia Marina fleet at the Battle of Lissa. He commanded the fleet from 1860 to 1861, and saw action in the struggle for Italian unification. After unification he was elected to the legislature; he became Minister of Marine in 1862 and in 1865 he was nominated a Senator. However, his career was marred during the war with Austria when he commanded the Italian fleet at Lissa. After the defeat, he was condemned for incapacity, and discharged.

Again in America, Charles Edgar Clark was an officer in the United States Navy during the American Civil War and the Spanish–American War. He commanded the battleship USS Oregon at the Mare Island Naval Shipyard, San Francisco, and when war with Spain was deemed inevitable, he received orders to proceed to Key West, Florida, with all haste. After a most remarkable voyage of over 14,000 miles (23,000 km), around Cape Horn, he joined the American fleet in Cuban waters on May 26, and on July 3 commanded his ship at the destruction of Cervera's squadron.

George Dewey was an admiral of the United States Navy, best known for his victory (without the loss of a single life of his own forces due to combat; one man died of a heart attack) at the Battle of Manila Bay during the Spanish–American War. He was also the only person in the history of the United States to have attained the rank of Admiral of the Navy, the most senior rank in the United States Navy.

Garrett J. Pendergrast was an officer in the United States Navy during the American Civil War. He commanded USS Boston during the Mexican–American War in 1846. In 1856, he commissioned USS Merrimack, the ship that would later become CSS Virginia.

Lewis Nixon was a shipbuilding executive, naval architect, and political activist. Nixon graduated first in his class from the Naval Academy in 1882 and was sent to study naval architecture at the Royal Naval College where, again, he graduated first in the class in 1885. In 1890, with help from assistant naval constructor David W. Taylor, he designed the Indiana-class battleships which included USS Indiana, USS Massachusetts and USS Oregon.

Patricio Montojo was the Spanish naval commander at the Battle of Manila Bay (May 1, 1898), a decisive battle of the Spanish–American War. At the outbreak of the Spanish–American War, Montojo was in command of the Spanish Squadron that was destroyed by the U.S. Asiatic Squadron in the Battle of Manila Bay on May 1, 1898. Montojo was wounded during this battle, as was also one of his two sons who were participating in this battle. United States naval forces under Commodore George Dewey decisively defeated Spain's Pacific fleet, at anchor in Manila Bay, the Philippines. Most of the seven Spanish vessels sank or surrendered.

== 20th century ==
In the 20th century, the internal combustion engine and gas turbine came to replace the steam engine in most ship applications. Trans-oceanic travel, transatlantic and transpacific, was a particularly important application, with steam powered Ocean liners replacing sailing ships, then culminating in the massive Superliners which included the RMS Titanic. The event with the Titanic lead to the Maritime Distress Safety System.

=== Maritime events of World War I ===
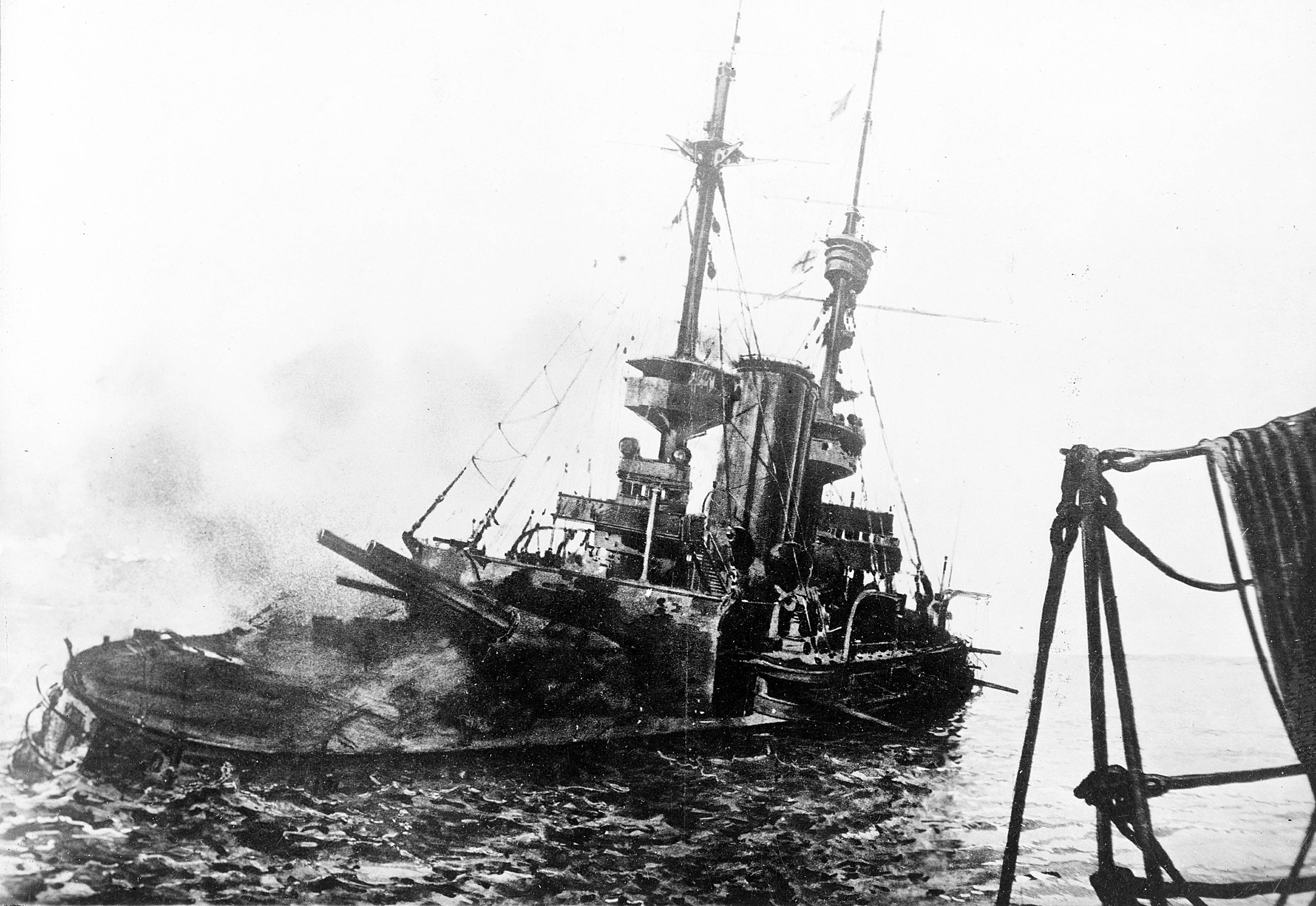
HMS Irresistible abandoned and sinking (Battle of Gallipoli).

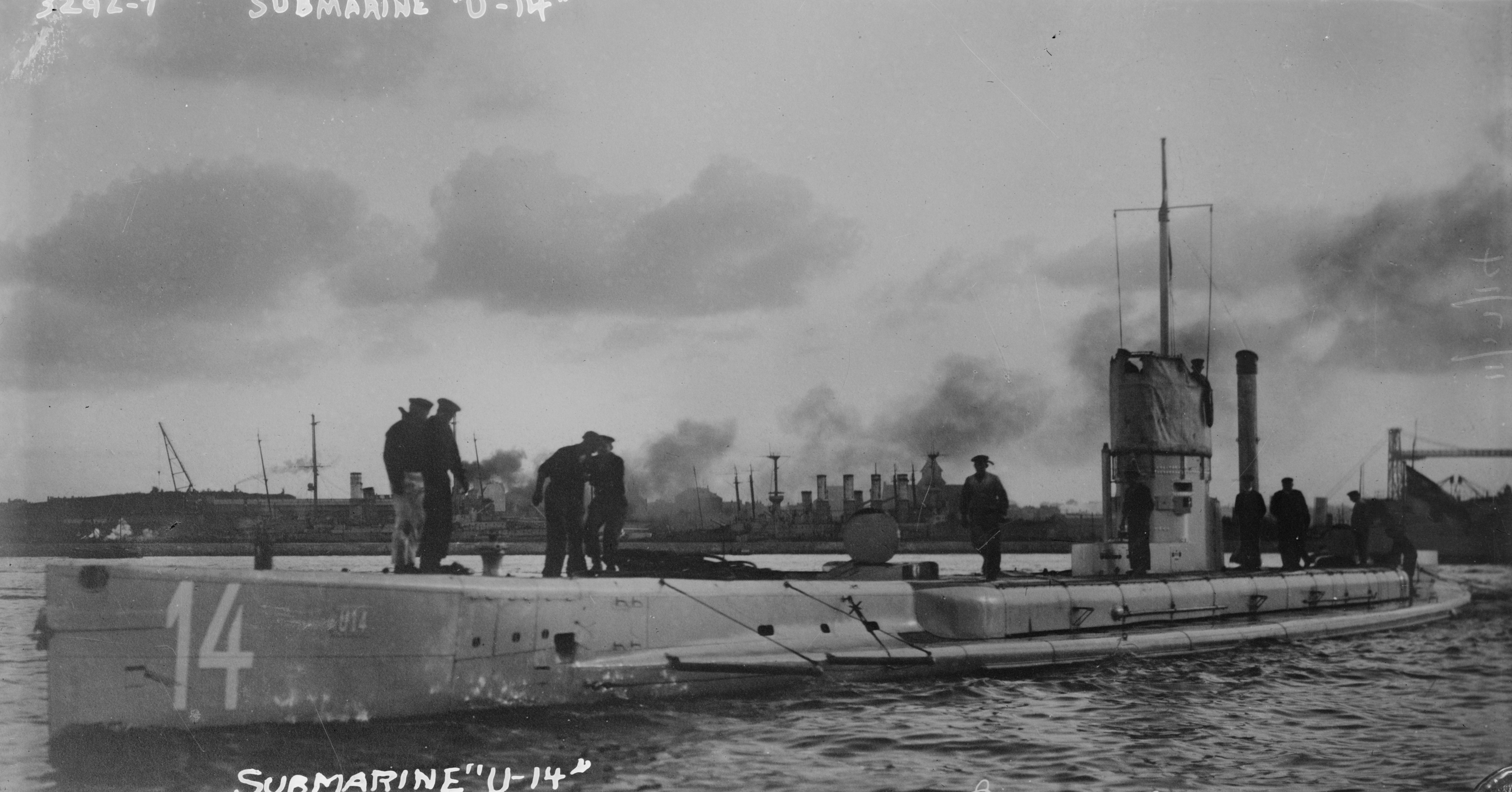
German U-boat U-14.

At the start of the war, the German Empire had cruisers scattered across the globe. Some of them were subsequently used to attack Allied merchant shipping. The British Royal Navy systematically hunted them down, though not without some embarrassment from its inability to protect allied shipping. For example, the detached light cruiser SMS Emden (6), part of the East-Asia squadron stationed at Tsingtao, seized or destroyed 15 merchantmen, as well as sinking a Russian cruiser and a French destroyer. However, the bulk of the German East-Asia squadron – consisting of the armoured cruisers SMS Scharnhorst and SMS Gneisenau, light cruisers SMS Nürnberg and SMS Leipzig and two transport ships – did not have orders to raid shipping and was instead underway to Germany when it was lost at the Battle of the Falkland Islands in December 1914.

Soon after the outbreak of hostilities, Britain initiated a naval blockade of Germany, preventing supplies from reaching its ports. The strategy proved effective, cutting off vital military and civilian supplies, although this blockade violated generally accepted international law codified by international agreements. A blockade of stationed ships within a three-mile (5 km) radius was considered legitimate, however Britain mined international waters to prevent any ships from entering entire sections of ocean, causing danger to even neutral ships. Though there was limited response to this tactic, some expected a better response for German's aim with its unrestricted submarine warfare.

German U-boats attempted to cut the supply lines between North America and Britain. The nature of submarine warfare meant that attacks often came without warning, giving the crews of the merchant ships little hope of survival. After the infamous sinking of the passenger ship RMS Lusitania in 1915, Germany promised not to target passenger liners. In 1916 the United States launched a protest over a cross-channel passenger ferry sinking, Germany modified its rules of engagement. Finally, in early 1917 Germany adopted a policy of unrestricted submarine warfare, realizing the Americans would eventually enter the war. Germany sought to strangle Allied sea lanes before the U.S. could transport a large army overseas.

The U-boat threat lessened in 1917, when merchant ships entered convoys escorted by destroyers. This tactic made it difficult for U-boats to find targets. The accompanying destroyers might sink a submerged submarine with depth charges. The losses to submarine attacks were reduced significantly. But the convoy system slowed the flow of supplies. The solution to the delays was a massive program to build new freighters. Various troop ships were too fast for the submarines and did not have to travel the North Atlantic in convoys.

The First World War also saw the first use of aircraft carriers in combat, with HMS Furious launching Sopwith Camels in a successful raid against the Zeppelin hangars at Tondern in July 1918.

=== Maritime events of World War II ===
==== Battle of the Atlantic ====
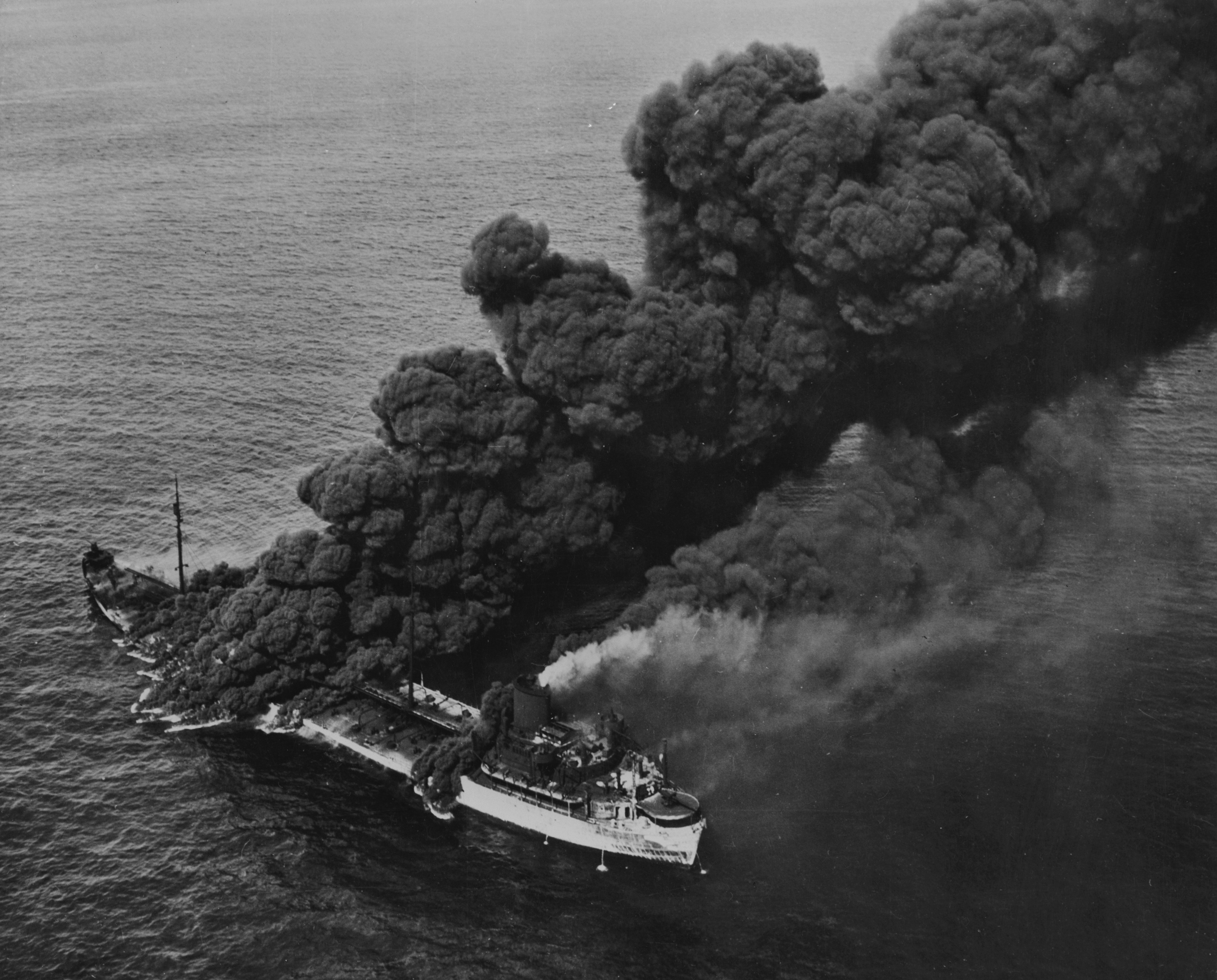
The tanker MS Pennsylvania Sun, torpedoed by U-571 on 15 July 1942 (was saved and returned to service in 1943).

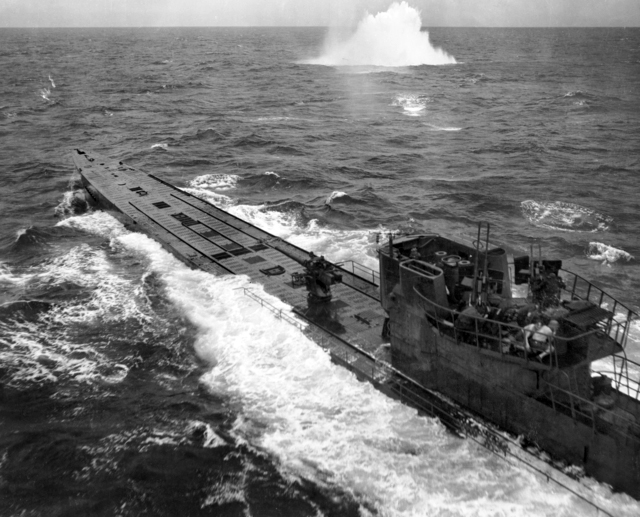
A U-boat under attack by Allied aircraft in November 1943.

In the North Atlantic, German U-boats attempted to cut supply lines to the United Kingdom by sinking merchant ships. In the first four months of the war they sank more than 110 vessels. In addition to supply ships, the U-boats occasionally attacked British and Canadian warships. One U-boat sank the British carrier HMS Courageous, while another managed to sink the battleship HMS Royal Oak in her home anchorage of Scapa Flow within the first two months of the war. Surface vessels such as the Admiral Graf Spee and the Bismarck were able to inflict losses on British vessels before they were sunk in 1939 and 1941 respectively, while the Tirpitz, based in Norway, was able to tie portions of the Royal Navy in harbor before it was sunk in 1944.

In the summer of 1941, the Soviet Union entered the war on the side of the Allies. Although the Soviets had tremendous reserves in manpower, they had lost much of their equipment and manufacturing base in the first few weeks following the German invasion. The Western Allies attempted to remedy this by sending Arctic convoys, which travelled from the United Kingdom and the United States to the northern ports of the Soviet Union: Archangel and Murmansk. The treacherous route around the North Cape of Norway was the site of many battles as the Germans continually tried to disrupt the convoys using U-boats, bombers, and surface ships.

Following the entry of the United States into the war in December 1941, U-boats sank shipping along the East Coast of the United States and Canada, the waters around Newfoundland, the Caribbean Sea, and the Gulf of Mexico. They were initially so successful that this became known among U-boat crews as the second happy time. Eventually, the institution of shore blackouts and an interlocking convoy system resulted in a drop in attacks and U-boats shifted their operations back to the mid-Atlantic.

The turning point of the Battle of the Atlantic took place in early 1943 as the Allies refined their naval tactics, effectively making use of new technology to counter the U-boats. The Allies produced ships faster than they were sunk, and lost fewer ships by adopting the convoy system. Improved anti-submarine warfare meant that the life expectancy of a typical U-boat crew would be measured in months. The vastly improved Type 21 U-boat appeared as the war was ending, but too late to affect the outcome. In December 1943, the last major sea battle between the Royal Navy and Nazi Germany's Kriegsmarine took place. At the Battle of North Cape, the German battleship Scharnhorst, was sunk by HMS Duke of York, HMS Belfast (6), and several destroyers.

==== Pacific War ====
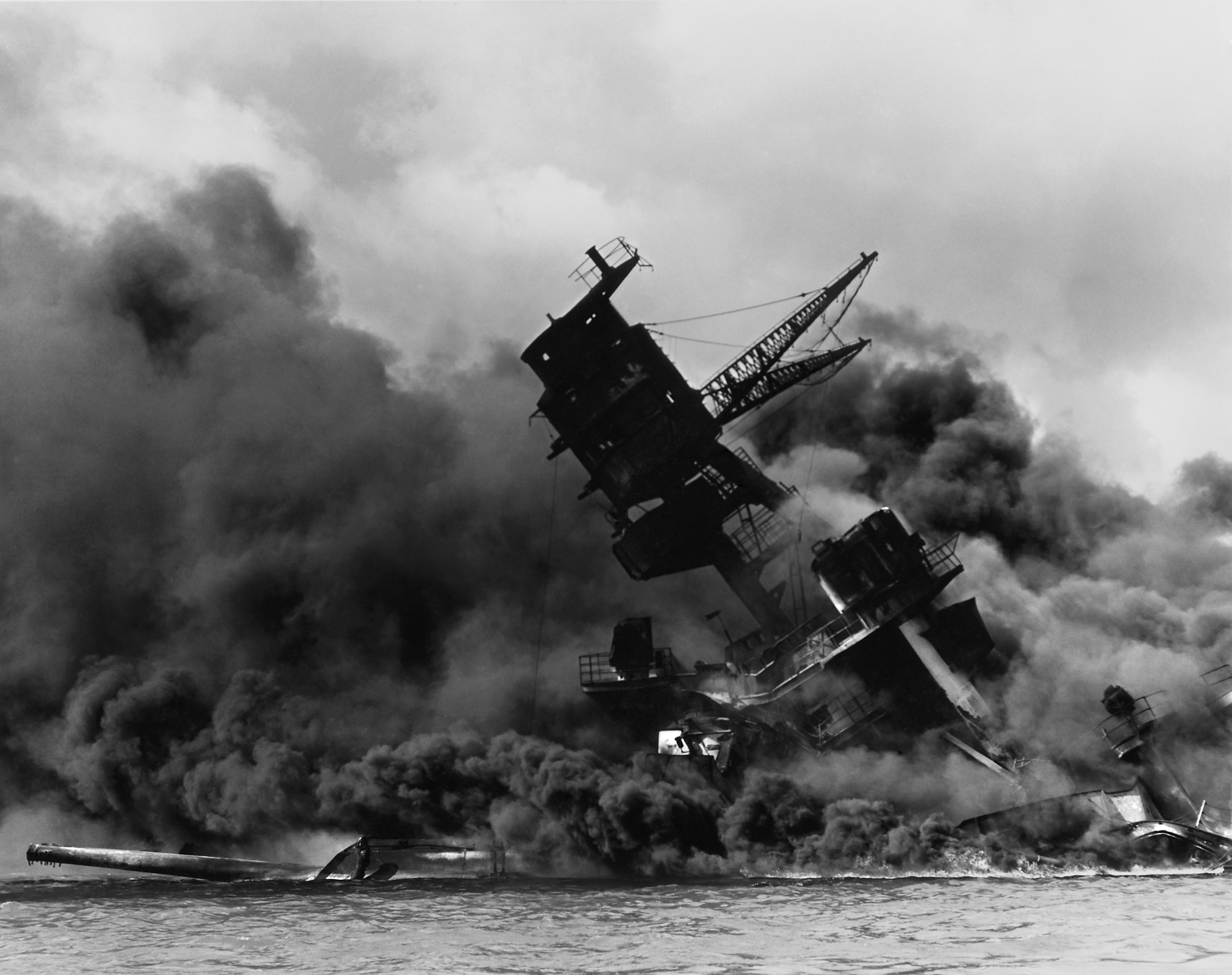
USS Arizona (6) burning after the Japanese attack on Pearl Harbor

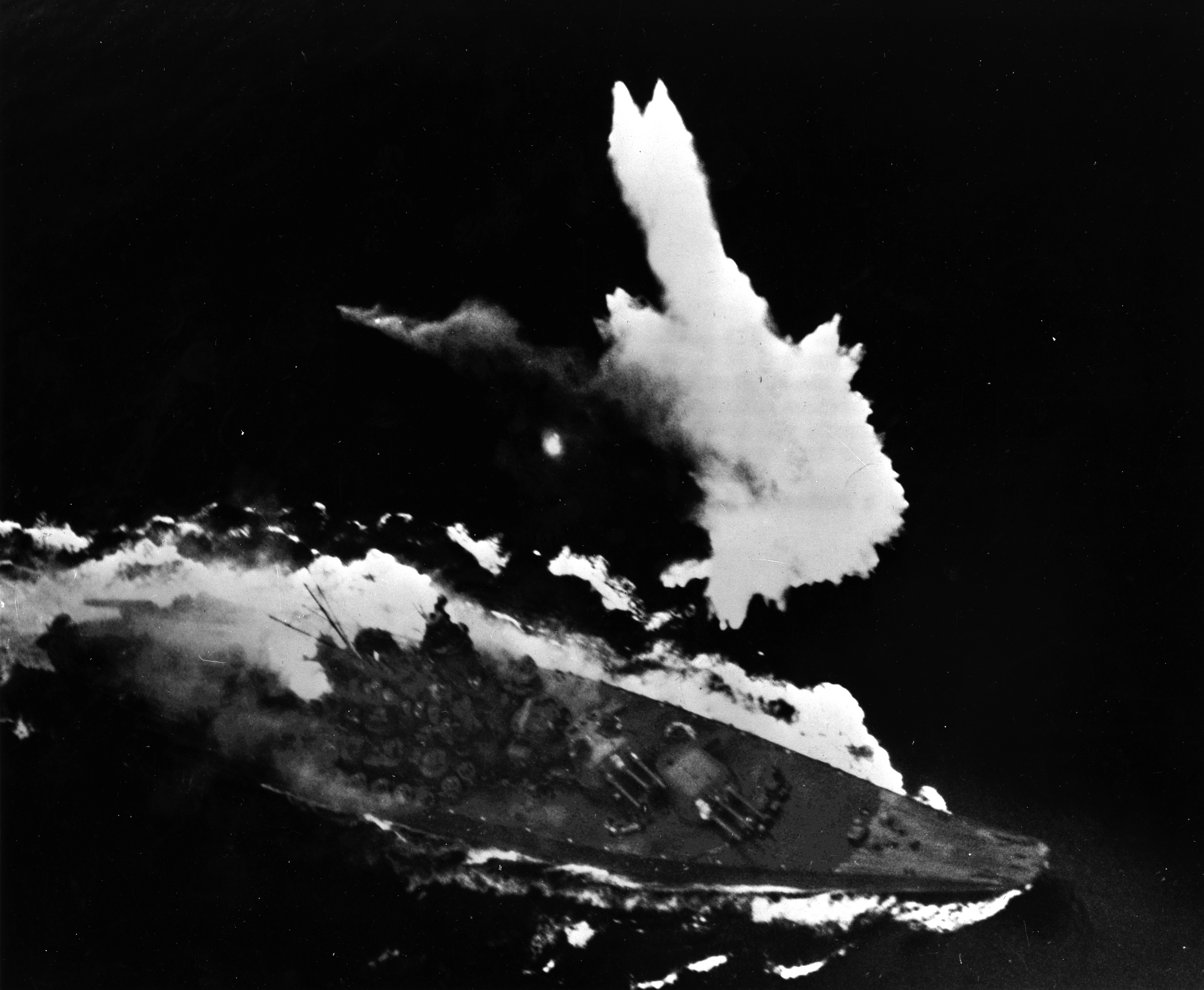
Yamato, the largest battleship ever built, was sunk on a one-way mission to Okinawa in April 1945.

The Pacific War was the part of World War II, especially following the successful Japanese attack on United States forces at Pearl Harbor to 1945. The main American naval theaters were as Pacific Ocean Areas and Southwest Pacific Area. The British fought chiefly in the Indian Ocean. It was a war of logistics, with American home bases in California and Hawaii sending supplies to Australia. The U.S. used its submarines to sink Japanese transports and oil tankers, thereby cutting off Japan's supplies to its outposts and causing a severe shortage of gasoline. The Pacific War also saw the widespread use of aircraft carriers by both the United States Navy and the Imperial Japanese Navy.

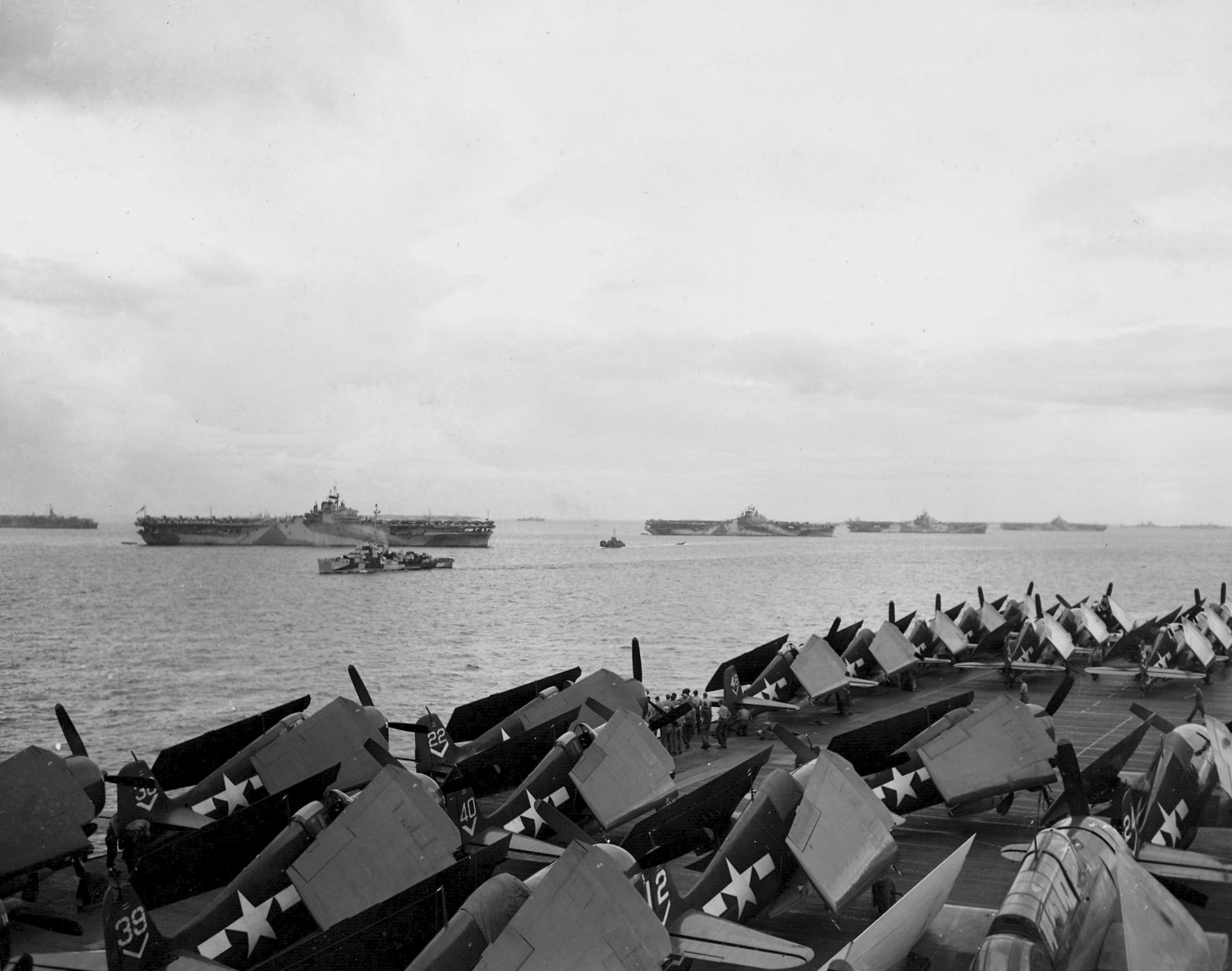
Aircraft carriers redefined naval battles from gunfire to airstrikes in the Pacific War.

Island hopping was the key strategy to bypass heavily fortified Japanese positions and instead concentrate the limited Allied resources on strategically important islands that were not well defended but capable of supporting the drive to the main islands of Japan. This strategy was possible in part because the Allies used submarine and air attacks to blockade and isolate Japanese bases, weakening their garrisons and reducing the Japanese ability to resupply and reinforce. Most Japanese soldiers killed in the Pacific died of starvation, and Japan used its submarine fleet to try to resupply them, resulting in specialized submarines such as the Type 3 submergence transport vehicle developed by the Imperial Japanese Army.

Hard-fought battles at the Mariana Islands and Palau, Iwo Jima, Okinawa, and others resulted in horrific casualties on both sides, but finally produced a Japanese retreat, culminating in the largest naval battle in history at Leyte Gulf. Faced with the loss of most of their experienced pilots, the Japanese increased their use of kamikaze tactics in an attempt to create unacceptably high casualties for the Allies. After the turning point of the Pacific where a third of the Imperial Japanese Navy fleet was hit in the Battle of Midway, the United States Department of the Navy recommended various positions for and against an invasion of Japan in 1945. Some staff proposed to force a Japanese surrender through a total naval blockade or air raids.

=== Latter half of the 20th century ===
In the latter half of the 20th century, various vessels, notably aircraft carriers, nuclear submarines, and nuclear-powered icebreakers, made use of nuclear marine propulsion. Sonar and radio augmented existing navigational technology.

Various blockades were set up in international action. Egypt blockaded of the Straits of Tiran from 1948 to 1956 and 1967. The United States set up a blockade of Cuba during the Cuban Missile Crisis in 1962. The Israelis set up a sea blockade of the Gaza Strip since the outbreak of the Second Intifada (2000) and up to the present. The Israeli blockades of some or all the shores of Lebanon at various times during the Lebanese Civil War (1975–1990), the 1982 Lebanon War, and the South Lebanon conflict (1985–2000)—resumed during the 2006 Lebanon War.

==== Cuban Missile Crisis ====
In 1959, the US government deployed Thor nuclear missiles in England, an initiative known as Project Emily. In 1961 the US put Jupiter nuclear missiles in Italy and Turkey. All were within range of Moscow. The US had also trained a paramilitary force of Cuban expatriates, for a CIA-led attempt to invade Cuba and overthrow its government in April 1961. Starting in November of that year, the US government engaged in a violent campaign of terrorism and sabotage in Cuba, referred to as the Cuban Project, which continued throughout the first half of the 1960s. The Soviet administration was concerned about a Cuban drift towards China, with which the Soviets had an increasingly strained relationship. In response to these factors the Soviet and Cuban governments agreed, at a meeting between leaders Nikita Khrushchev and Fidel Castro in July 1962, to place nuclear missiles on Cuba to deter a future US invasion. Construction of launch facilities started shortly thereafter.

A U-2 spy plane captured photographic evidence of medium- and long-range launch facilities in October. US president John F. Kennedy convened a meeting of the National Security Council and other key advisers, forming the Executive Committee of the National Security Council (EXCOMM). Kennedy was advised to carry out an air strike on Cuban soil in order to compromise Soviet missile supplies, followed by an invasion of the Cuban mainland. He chose a less aggressive course in order to avoid a declaration of war. On 22 October, Kennedy ordered a naval blockade to prevent further missiles from reaching Cuba. He referred to the blockade as a "quarantine", not as a blockade, so the US could avoid the formal implications of a state of war.

An agreement was eventually reached between Kennedy and Khrushchev. The Soviets would dismantle their offensive weapons in Cuba, subject to United Nations verification, in exchange for a US public declaration and agreement not to invade Cuba again. The United States secretly agreed to dismantle all of the offensive weapons it had deployed to Turkey. All Thors in the UK were disbanded by August 1963. While the Soviets dismantled their missiles, some Soviet bombers remained in Cuba, and the United States kept the naval quarantine in place until 20 November 1962. The blockade was formally ended on 20 November after all offensive missiles and bombers had been withdrawn from Cuba. The evident necessity of a quick and direct communication line between the two powers resulted in the Moscow–Washington hotline. A series of agreements later reduced US–Soviet tensions for several years.

==== Gulf of Tonkin Incident ====
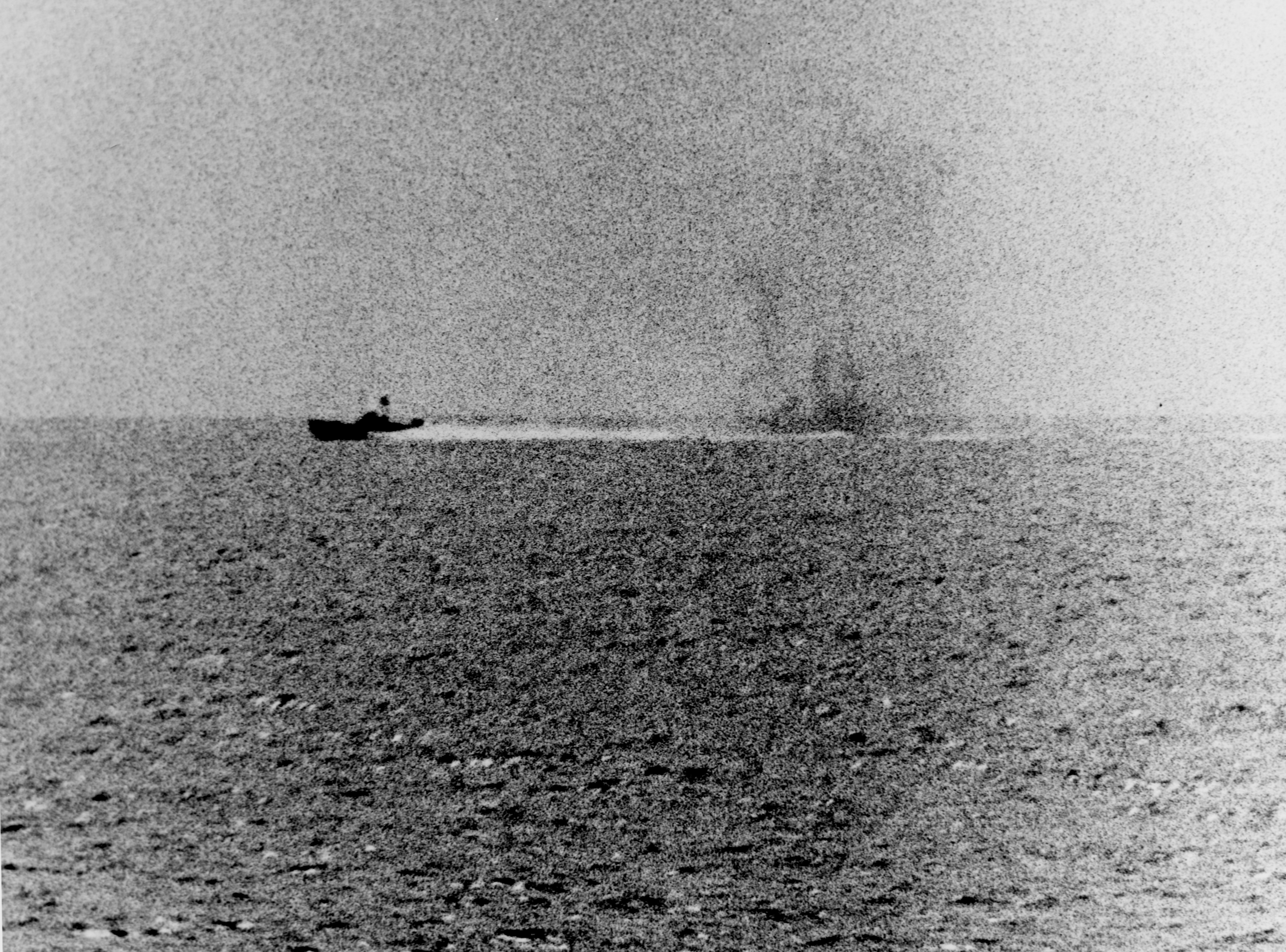
A North Vietnamese P-4 torpedo boat engaging the USS Maddox, August 1964

The Gulf of Tonkin Incident was an alleged pair of attacks by the Democratic Republic of Vietnam against two American warships in 1964. One night a U.S. ship was sailing in North Vietnam when they thought they were being attacked. President Lyndon B. Johnson decided that he needed to make a statement and asked Congress for permission to act on this. Congress gave him permission by approving the Gulf of Tonkin Resolution on August 7, 1964. With this resolution, Johnson was able to release missiles on North Vietnamese torpedo boats and oil storage facilities, gradually escalating American involvement in Vietnam. The Resolution was repealed in January 1971.

==== Falklands War ====
In 1982, the Falklands War was a war over the Falkland Islands with Argentina. This was said to be a very desperate war between Britain and Argentina. Argentina invaded the Falkland Islands where they were going in and out of the island. Britain was initially taken by surprise when the Argentine attack on the South Atlantic islands happened, but launched a naval task force to engage the Argentine Navy and Air Force, and retake the islands by amphibious assault. Argentina ended up losing the war.

==== Panama Canal handover ====
Though controversial within the United States, a process of handing the Panama Canal lead to Panamanian control of the Panama Canal Zone by the Panama Canal Authority (ACP). It was effective at noon on December 31, 1999. Before this handover, the government of Panama held an international bid to negotiate a 25-year contract for operation of the Canal's container shipping ports (chiefly two facilities at the Atlantic and Pacific outlets), which was won by the Chinese firm Hutchison Whampoa, a Hong Kong-based shipping concern whose owner Li Ka Shing is the wealthiest man in Asia. One of the conditions on the handover to the Panama Canal Authority by the United States was the permanent neutrality of the Canal and the explicit statements that allowed the United States to come back at any time.

== 21st century ==
Since the turn of the millennium, the construction of stealth ships have occurred. These are ships which employs stealth technology construction techniques in an effort to ensure that it is harder to detect by one or more of radar, visual, sonar, and infrared methods. These techniques borrow from stealth aircraft technology, although some aspects such as wake reduction are unique to stealth ships' design.

Some of the major social changes of this period include women becoming admirals in defensive navies, being allowed to work on submarines, and being appointed captains of cruise ships.

=== Arctic Resources Race ===
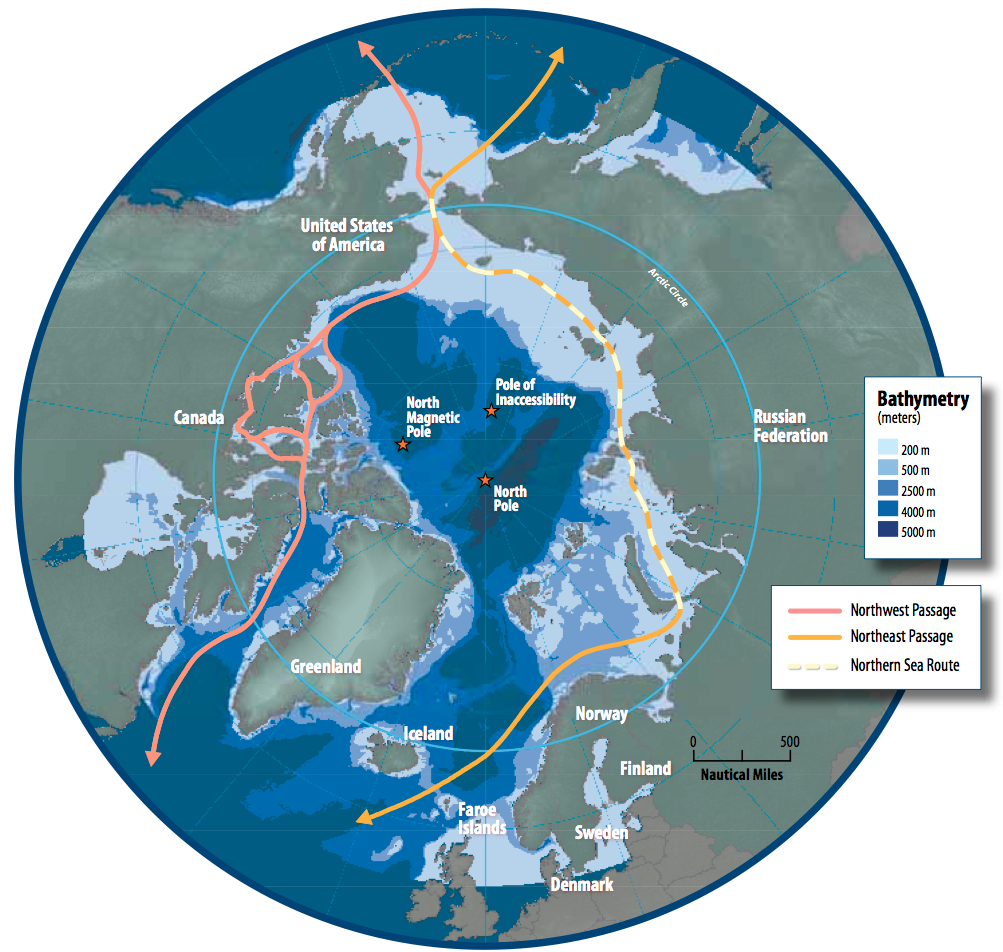
Map of the Arctic region showing the Northeast Passage, the Northern Sea Route within it, and the Northwest Passage.

As of March 2020, global superpowers are currently in competition of laying claim to both regions of the Arctic Circle and shipping routes that lead directly into the Pacific and Atlantic oceans from the North Pole. Extensive access to the sea routes of the North Pole would allow, for example, saving thousands of kilometers in distance from Europe to China. Most prominently, claims to territory in the Arctic Circle would guarantee a plethora of resources; some including: oil, gas, minerals, and fish.

=== Piracy ===
Map showing the extent of Somali pirate attacks on shipping vessels between 2005 and 2010.

Seaborne piracy against transport vessels remains a significant issue (with estimated worldwide losses of US$13 to $16 billion per year), particularly in the waters between the Red Sea and Indian Ocean, off the Somali coast, and also in the Strait of Malacca and Singapore, which are used by over 50,000 commercial ships a year.

Modern pirates favor small boats and taking advantage of the small number of crew members on modern cargo vessels. They also use large vessels to supply the smaller attack/boarding vessels. Modern pirates can be successful because a large amount of international commerce occurs via shipping. Major shipping routes take cargo ships through narrow bodies of water (such as the Gulf of Aden and the Strait of Malacca) making them vulnerable to be overtaken and boarded by small motorboats. Other active areas include the South China Sea and the Niger Delta. As usage increases, many of these ships have to lower cruising speeds to allow for navigation and traffic control, making them prime targets for piracy.

The International Maritime Bureau (IMB) maintains statistics regarding pirate attacks dating back to 1995. Their records indicate hostage-taking overwhelmingly dominates the types of violence against seafarers. For example, in 2006, there were 239 attacks, 77 crew members were kidnapped and 188 taken hostage but only 15 of the pirate attacks resulted in murder. In 2007 the attacks rose by 10% to 263 attacks. There was a 35% increase on reported attacks involving guns. Crew members that were injured numbered 64 compared to just 17 in 2006. That number does not include hostages/kidnapping where they were not injured.

Modern Piracy

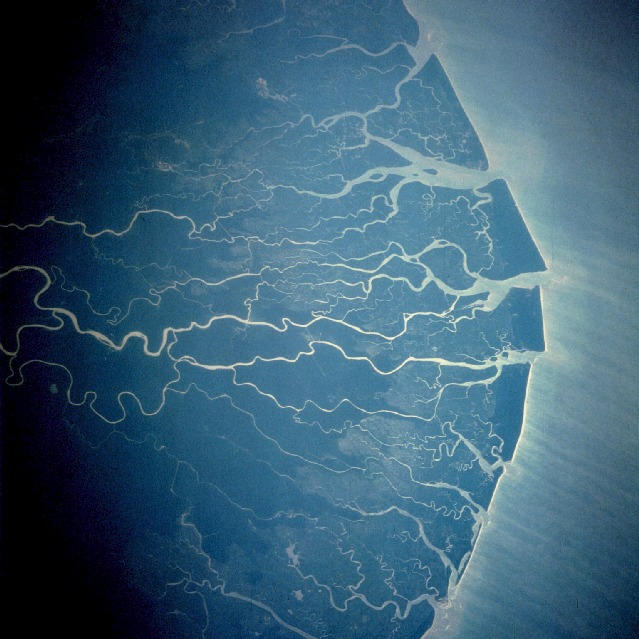
Aerial photograph of the Niger Delta, a center of piracy.

Modern definitions of piracy include the following acts:

- Boarding
- Extortion
- Hostage taking
- Kidnapping of people for ransom
- Murder
- Robbery
- Sabotage resulting in the ship subsequently sinking
- Seizure of items or the ship
- Shipwrecking done intentionally to a ship

== See also ==
=== General ===
- Atlantic history
- Atlantic World
- Bibliography of early U.S. naval history
- Bibliography of 18th–19th century Royal Naval history
- Congo River
- History of the Royal Navy
- History of whaling
- Indian maritime history
- List of museum ships
- List of former museum ships
- List of naval battles
- Maritime history of Africa
- Maritime history of Colonial America
- Maritime history of Europe
- Maritime museum
- Maritime timeline
- Maritime transport
- Medieval ships
- Military history
- Ming treasure voyages
- Naval history
- Niger River
- Ocean liner
- Sailortowns
- Ships of ancient Rome
- Timeline of maritime migration and exploration

=== Historiography articles ===
- American Neptune, a scholarly journal
- Atlantic history, historiography of the Atlantic region
- Frank C. Munson Institute of American Maritime History
- International Commission for Maritime History
- North American Society for Oceanic History
