= Maritime history of the United Kingdom =

The Maritime history of the United Kingdom involves events including shipping, ports, navigation, and seamen, as well as marine sciences, exploration, trade, and maritime themes in the arts from the creation of the kingdom of Great Britain as a united, sovereign state, on 1 May 1707 in accordance with the Treaty of Union, signed on 22 July 1706. Until the advent of air transport and the creation of the Channel Tunnel, marine transport was the only way of reaching the British Isles. For this reason, maritime trade and naval power have always had great importance.

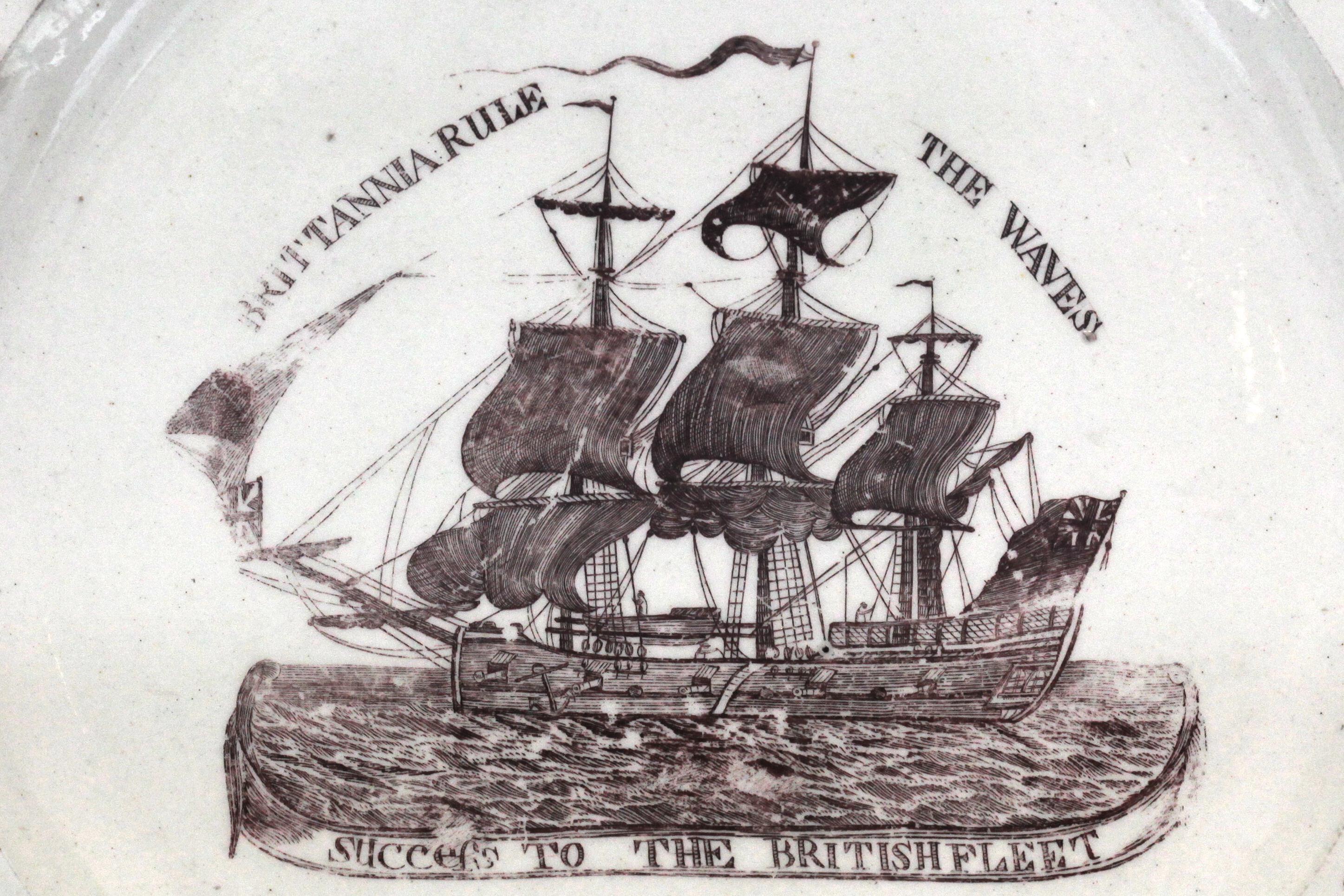
Britannia rule the waves: decorated plate made in Liverpool circa 1793–1794 (Musée de la Révolution française).

Prior to the Acts of Union, 1707, the maritime history of the British Isles was largely dominated by that of England. (See Maritime history of England for more details.)

== Chronology ==
=== Eighteenth century ===
In the eighteenth century, Britain was a major exporter of wool fabric and other manufactured goods.

Lloyd's List was established in 1734 and Lloyd's Register in 1764/5. The Marine Society was set up in 1756 with the aim of sending poor boys to sea.

Steam technology was first applied to boats in the 1770s but sailing ships continued to be developed. In 1794 an experimental steam powered ship called the Kent was built which showed designers the way forward. Nathanial Symonds demonstrated a sinking boat in 1729.

Towards the end of the century, the Napoleonic Wars started with Napoleon, later crowned as French Emperor, and naval battles continued into the 19th century.

=== Nineteenth century ===
In 1801 a steamship called the Charlotte Dundas ran trials on a canal near Glasgow, towing barges. In 1815 Pierre Andriel crossed the English Channel aboard the steamship Élise. By the mid-century steamboats were a common sight on British rivers and canals. Regular steamship sailings across the Atlantic started in the 1830s.

Shipbuilders began using iron instead of wood as the ships could be made larger and stronger and with more cargo space. Ships also began to be fitted with steam engines and paddle wheels but the latter was found to be unsuited to open sea use. From the 1840s screw propellers replaced paddles. In the 1870s new more efficient engines were introduced so that sailing ships began to be phased out. From the 1880s steel began to replace iron for the hulls.

Because of the space required for coal and the large crew requirements on steamships, sailing ships were favoured for long voyages and reached a design peak with the clippers used for transporting tea and wool. Steamships gradually replaced sailing ships for commercial shipping during the 19th century, particularly after more efficient engine designs were developed in the later part of the period.

The Battle of Navarino in 1827 was the last to be fought by the Royal Navy entirely with sailing ships. By the end of the century submarine design had progressed sufficiently to be useful, as had the design of torpedoes.

=== Twentieth century ===
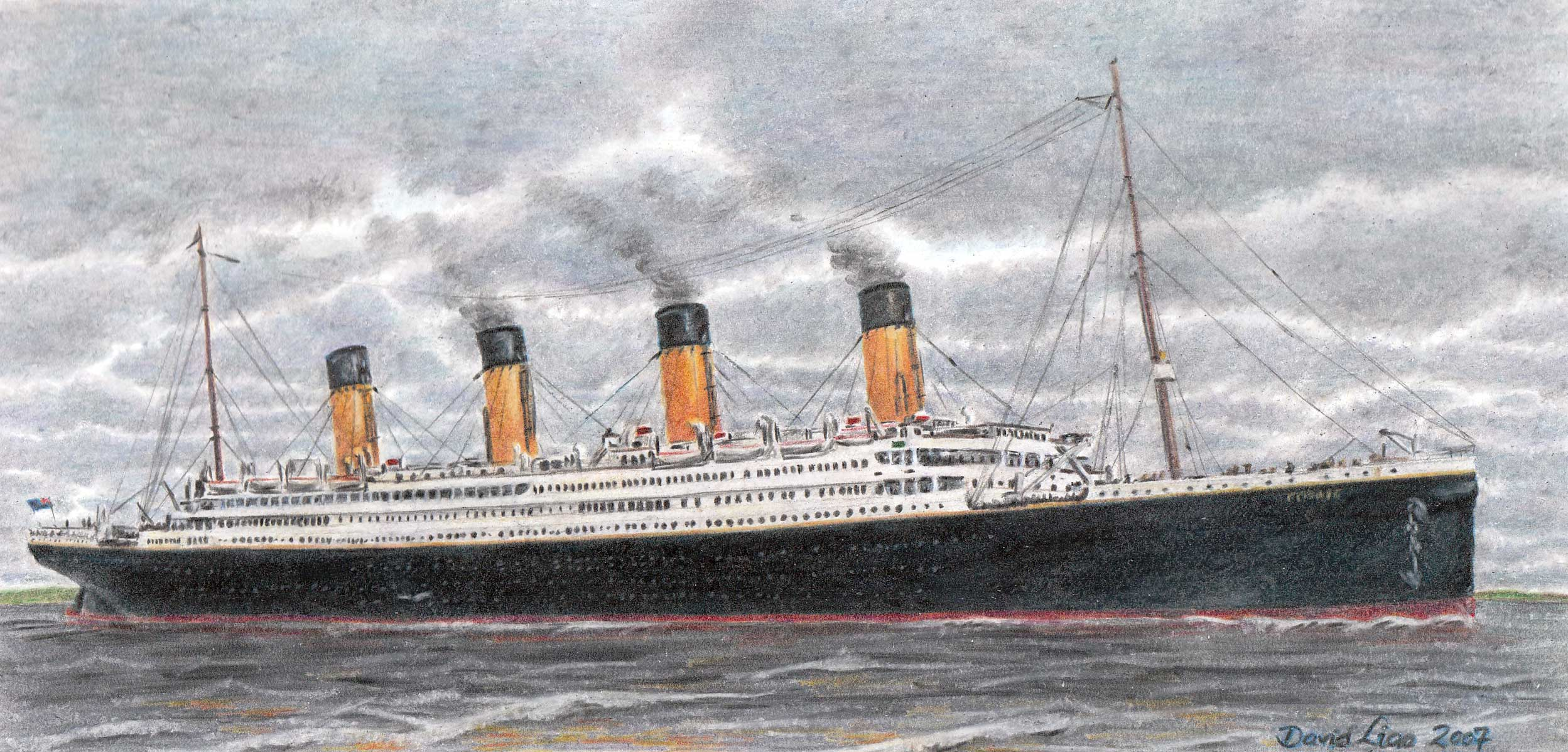
RMS Titanic, days before sinking.

At the start of the century 25% of the world's trade was through British ports, 18% of this being to North America. Trans-oceanic travel was important at the start of the century with transatlantic liners competing for the "Blue Riband" for the fastest crossing. A significant event was the sinking of the Titanic in 1912. This led to the Global Maritime Distress Safety System and to the Iceberg Patrol. The rise of air travel led to a decrease in ocean travel but then, towards the end of the century, cruise ships became important again.

During the 20th century new types of cargo ships appeared - the container ship, the oil tanker and the gas container ship. Specialised ports for handling these were also developed.

Most warships used steam propulsion until the advent of the gas turbine in the mid part of the period. Steamships were superseded by diesel-driven cargo ships in the second half of the century. Submarines were mainly powered by a combination of diesel and batteries until the advent of nuclear marine propulsion in 1955.

There were two major wars against Germany and its allies that saw a massive expansion in naval fleets and the use of air power at sea, resulting in the construction of aircraft carriers that became the main centre of sea power. Both wars saw massive destruction of the British merchant fleet but new construction exceeded the rate of destruction. After World War II there was an initial drop in warship numbers but then the rise of the Soviet naval threat resulted in the Cold War with the construction of new warships and submarines. The reduction of the Soviet threat at the end of the century was offset by threats from other sources and piracy as well as sea-borne drug trafficking.

Cod War, offshore oil, gas and wind farms. Exploitation of wave power was started.

=== Twenty-first century ===
The start of the century saw the building of superliners. The Royal Navy saw further reductions in its strength, though new larger aircraft carriers have been promised.

== Royal Navy ==
=== Eighteenth-century navy ===
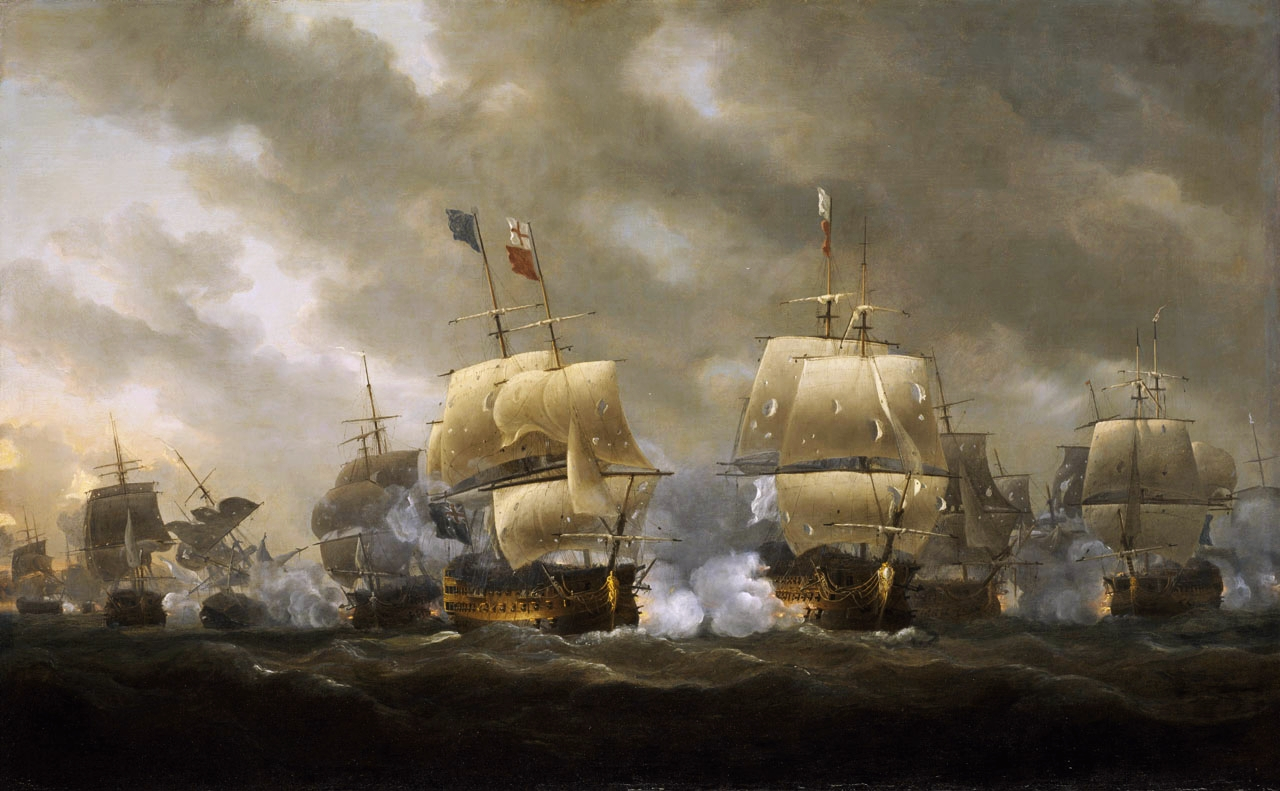
The Battle of Quiberon Bay which ended the French invasion plans in 1759

Under the Acts of Union 1707 in 1707 the Royal Scots Navy merged with the English navy and the British Royal Navy came into being. The early 18th century saw the Royal Navy with more ships than other navies. Although it suffered severe financial problems through the earlier part of this period, modern methods of financing government, and in particular the Navy, were developed, This financing enabled the Navy to become the most powerful force of the later 18th century without bankrupting the country. The Napoleonic Wars saw the Royal Navy reach a peak of efficiency, dominating the navies of all Britain's adversaries.

Under William III and Mary II a hospital at Greenwich was founded to relieve the sufferings of British seamen.

=== Nineteenth-century navy ===
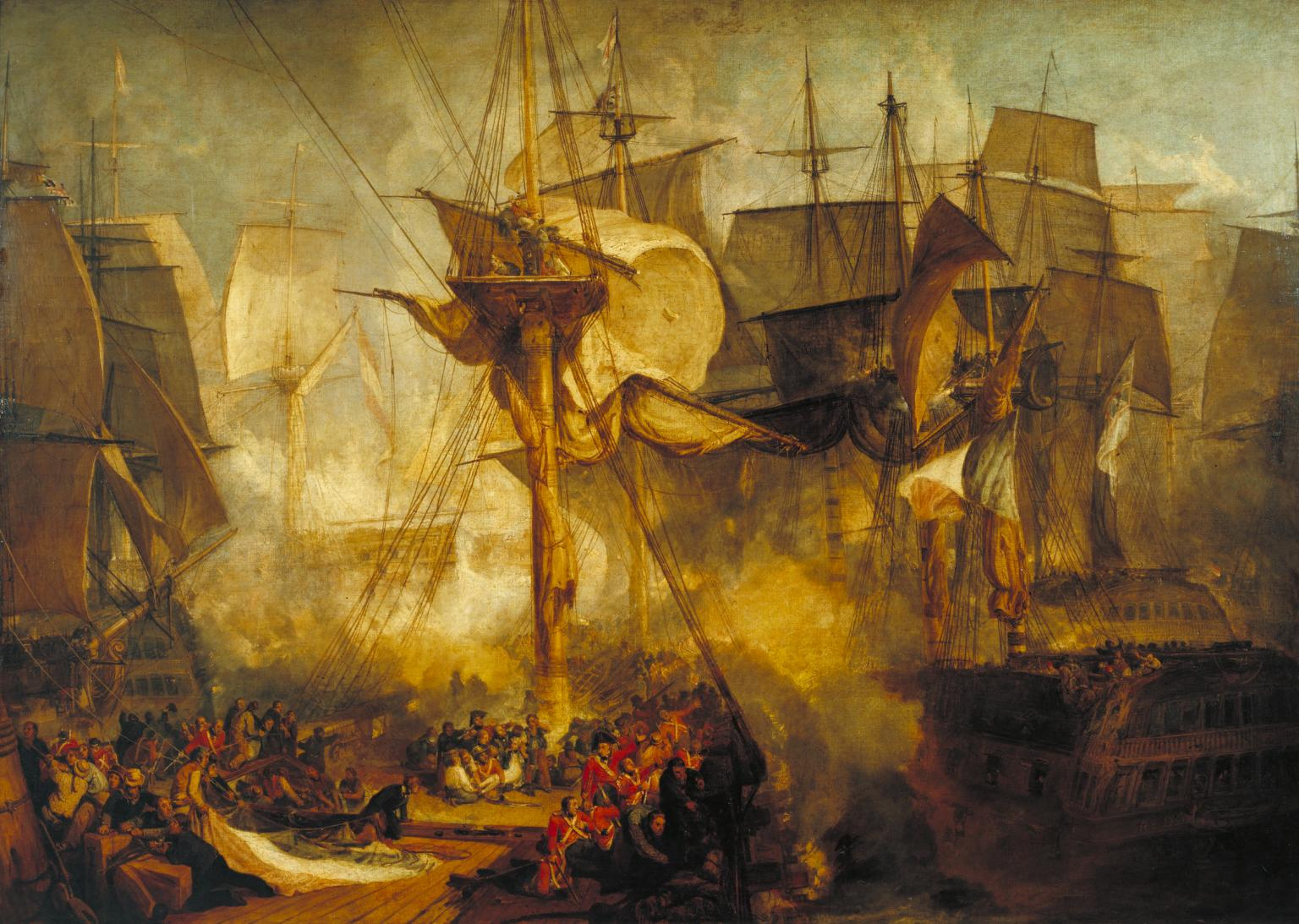
The Battle of Trafalgar by J.M.W. Turner, 1808

Between 1793 and 1815 the Royal Navy lost 344 vessels due to non-combat causes: 75 by foundering, 234 shipwrecked and 15 from accidental burnings or explosions. In the same period it lost 103,000 seamen: 84,440 by disease and accidents, 12,680 by shipwreck or foundering and 6,540 by enemy action.

From the Battle of Trafalgar in 1805 until the outbreak of the European War in 1914, Britain had an almost uncontested power over the world's oceans, and it was said that "Britannia ruled the waves". During the Napoleonic Wars, there was increasing tension at sea between Britain and the United States, as American traders took advantage of their country's neutrality to trade with the French-controlled parts of Europe as well as with the British Isles. The Anglo-American War of 1812 was characterised by single-ship actions and the disruption of merchant shipping.

=== Twentieth-century navy ===
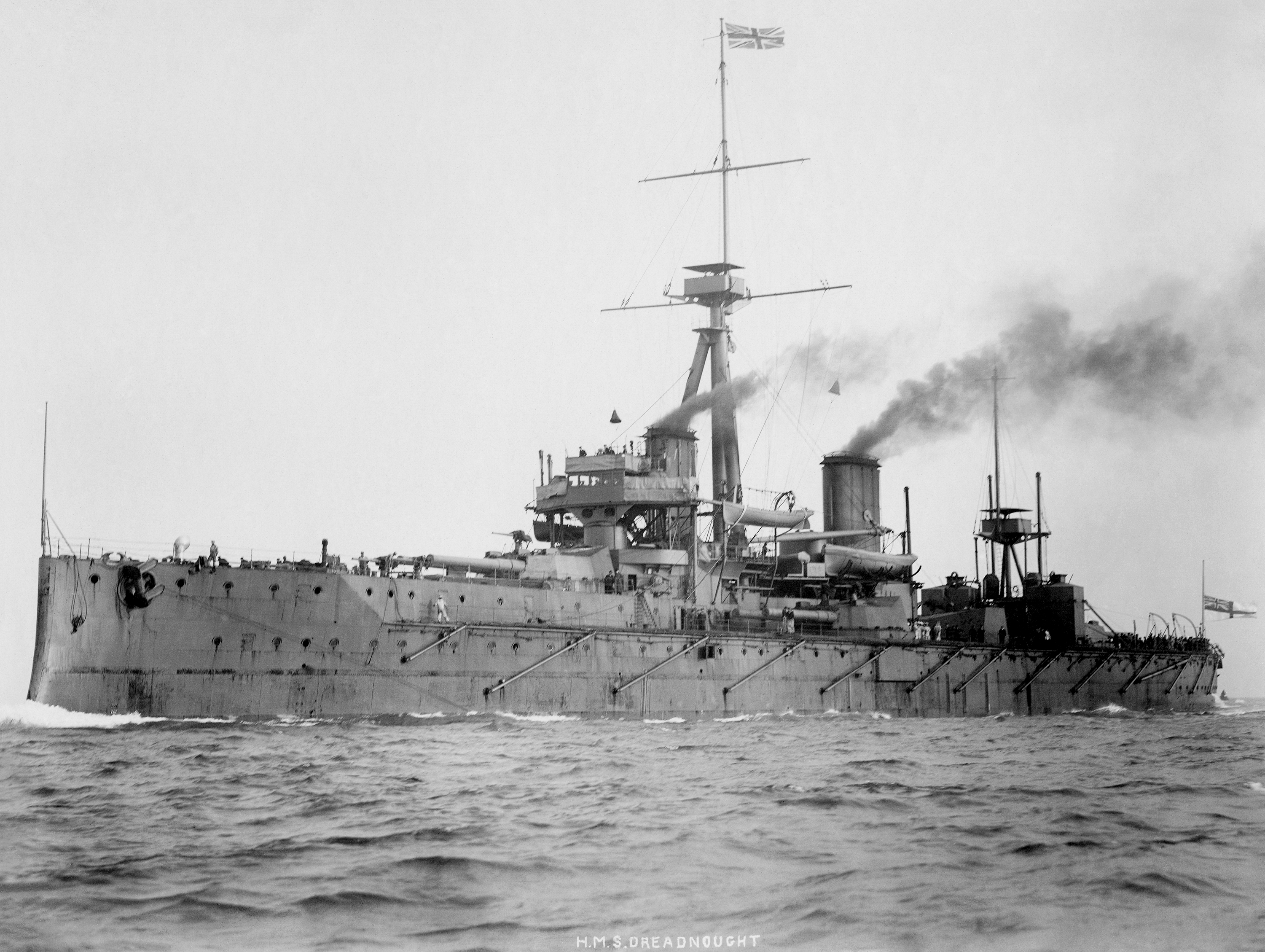
HMS Dreadnought

The start of the 20th century saw structural changes in the Navy brought about by the First Sea Lord Jackie Fisher who retired, scrapped or placed in reserve many of the older vessels, making new funds and manpower available for newer ships. He saw the development of HMS Dreadnought, the first all-big-gun ship and one of the most influential ships in naval history. This ship rendered all other battleships then existing obsolete, and indeed lent her name to an entire class of battleships, the dreadnoughts. Admiral Percy Scott introduced new programmes such a gunnery training and central fire control which greatly increased the effectiveness in battle of the Navy's ships.

During the First World War the Royal Navy played a vital role in escorting convoys of food, arms and raw materials to Britain. It defeated the German campaign of unrestricted submarine warfare and prevented the breakout of the German High Seas Fleet. As well as tasks in the Atlantic it also carried out operations in the Baltic, Mediterranean and Black Sea.

In the inter-war years the Royal Navy was stripped of much of its power. The Washington Naval Treaty of 1922, together with the deplorable financial conditions during the immediate post-war period and the Great Depression, forced the Admiralty to scrap some capital ships and to cancel plans for new construction. The London Naval Treaty of 1930 deferred new capital ship construction until 1937 and reiterated construction limits on cruisers, destroyers and submarines. As international tensions increased in the mid-thirties, the Second London Naval Treaty of 1936 failed to halt the development of a naval arms race and by 1938 treaty limits were effectively ignored. The re-armament of the Royal Navy was well under way by this point; the Royal Navy had constructed the King George V class of 1936 and several aircraft carriers including Ark Royal. In addition to new construction, several existing battleships, battlecruisers and heavy cruisers were re-constructed and new anti-aircraft weaponry reinforced. However, around this time the Imperial Japanese Navy and the United States Navy began to surpass the Royal Navy in power.

After the Second World War, the decline of the British Empire and economic hardships in Britain forced reduction in size and capability of the Royal Navy. The increasingly powerful United States Navy took on the former role of the Royal Navy as a means of keeping peace around the world. However, the threat of the Soviet Union created a new role for the Navy within NATO.

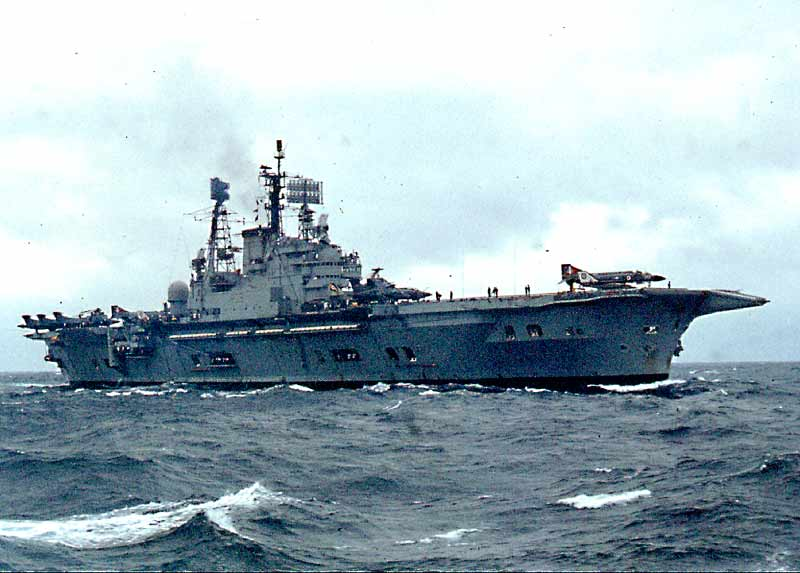
HMS Ark Royal in 1976.

The 1960s saw the peak of the Royal Navy's capabilities in the post-war era. The fleet carriers Ark Royal, Eagle, the rebuilt Victorious, Hermes and Centaur gave the Royal Navy the most powerful fleet outside the United States. The navy also had a large fleet of frigates and destroyers. New, more modern units like the County-class destroyers and Leander class-frigates began to enter service in the 1960s. At this time the Royal Navy received its first nuclear weapons and was to become responsible for the maintenance of the UK's nuclear deterrent.

However, a Labour government came into power and was determined to cut defence expenditure. After this the navy began to fall in size and by 1979 the last fleet carrier was scrapped. The navy was forced to make do with three much smaller Invincible-class aircraft carriers with Sea Harrier aircraft. The fleet was now centred around anti-submarine warfare in the North Atlantic. Further Defence Reviews have further cut the Royal Navy.

Although the Royal Navy has significantly reduced in size since the 1960s, reflecting the reduced requirements of the state, this does not take into account the increase in technological capability of the Navy's ships. The navy is responsible for the British strategic nuclear deterrent. It concentrates on anti-submarine warfare and mine countermeasures as part of NATO.

=== The Navy Board ===
The Navy Board was responsible for providing the ships and the men to man them, including Warrant Officers. The Impress Service recruited volunteers but also took many against their will. After 1740 the Admiralty gained control over the Navy Board.

=== Ministry of Defence ===
In 1964 the Admiralty and the Navy Board became part of the integrated Ministry of Defence. This included the Fleet Air Arm.

=== Notable wars ===
==== American Wars ====
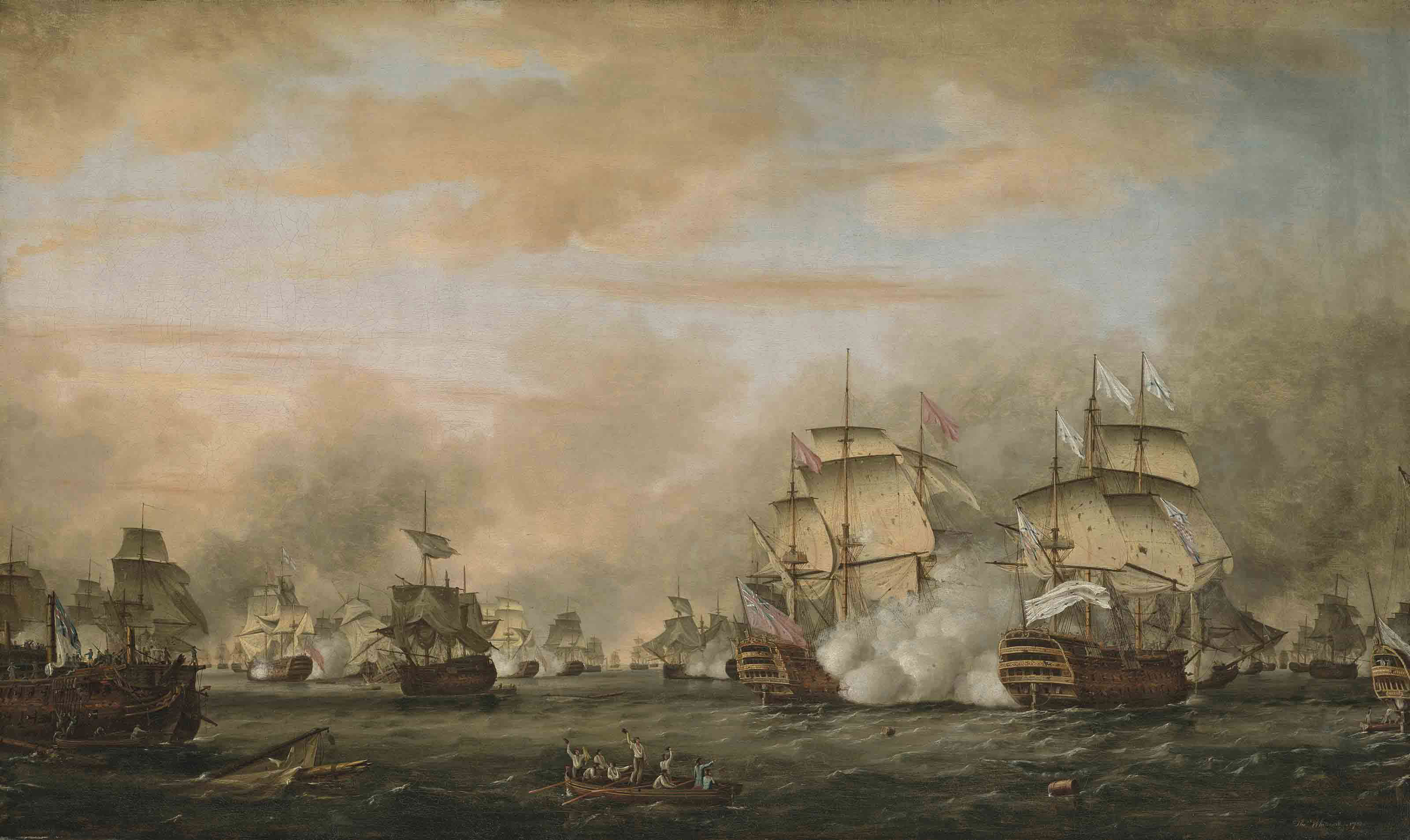
The Battle of the Saintes in 1782

During the American Revolution, a primitive submarine tried and failed to sink a British warship, HMS Eagle the flagship of the blockers, in New York City harbour in 1776. John Paul Jones attacked British shipping in the Irish Sea and also the towns of Whitehaven and Kirkcudbright. In the Anglo-American War of 1812, an unsuccessful submarine attack was made on a British warship stationed in New London harbour.

==== French Revolutionary/Napoleonic Wars ====
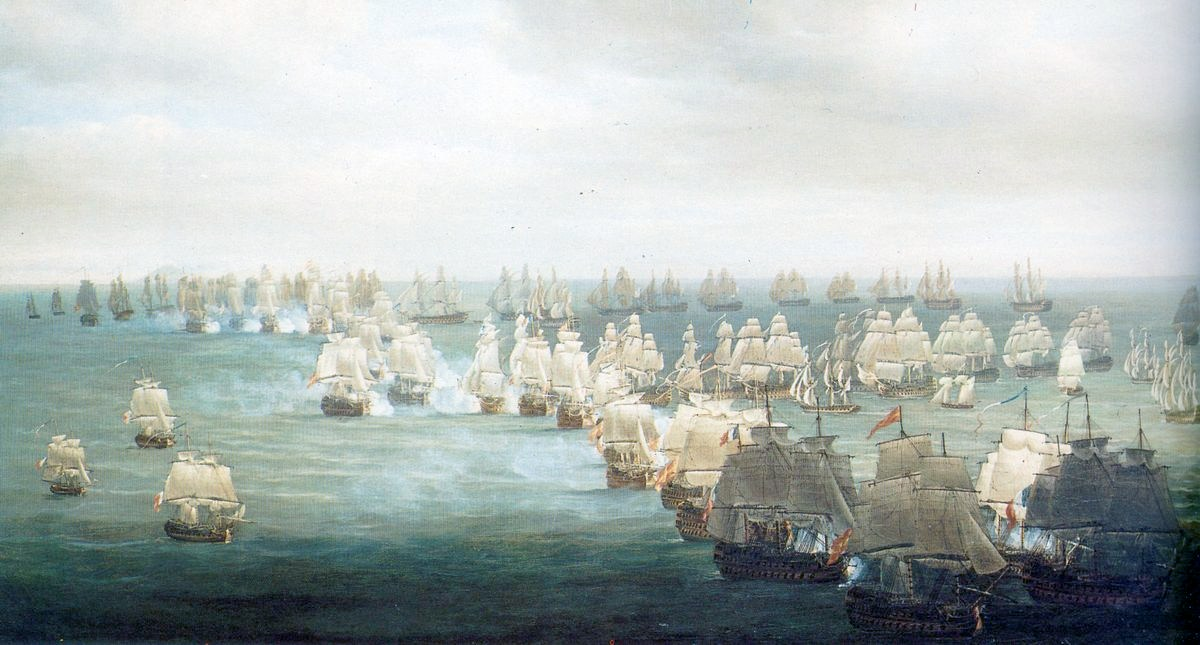
The Battle of Trafalgar, depicted here in its opening phase

In 1793 France declared war on Britain. The next 12 years saw many battles such as that at Cape St. Vincent and at the Battle of the Nile, and short-lived truces such as the Treaty of Amiens. The height of the Royal Navy's achievements came on 21 October 1805 at the Battle of Trafalgar, where a numerically smaller but more experienced British fleet under the command of Lord Horatio Nelson decisively defeated a combined French and Spanish fleet.

==== Maritime events of World War I ====
At the start of the war the German Empire had cruisers scattered across the globe. Some of them were subsequently used to attack Allied merchant shipping. The Royal Navy systematically hunted them down, though not without some embarrassment from its inability to protect Allied shipping. For example, the detached light cruiser Emden, part of the East Asia squadron stationed at Qingdao, seized or destroyed 15 merchantmen as well as sinking a Russian cruiser and a French destroyer. However, the bulk of the East Asia squadron - consisting of the armoured cruisers Scharnhorst and Gneisenau, light cruisers Nürnberg, Leipzig, and Dresden and two transport ships - did not have orders to raid shipping and was instead underway to Germany when it was defeated by the British at the Battle of the Falkland Islands in December 1914, with only Dresden escaping destruction.

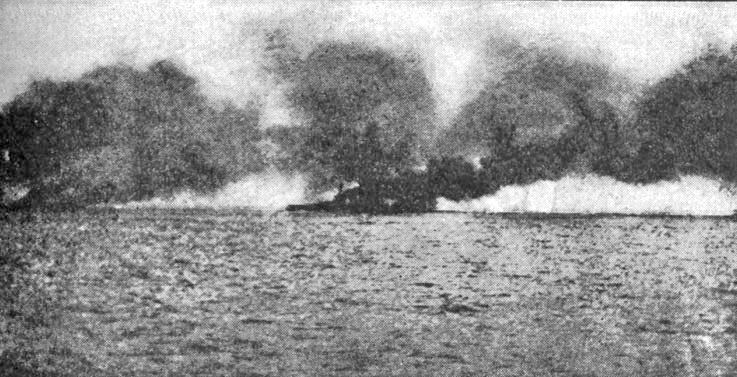
Beatty's flagship HMS Lion burning after having been hit by a salvo from SMS Lützow.

The Battle of Jutland was the major sea battle of the First World War. Although the British Grand Fleet suffered greater losses than the German High Seas Fleet, the latter withdrew to port and the British retained control of the North Sea.

Soon after the outbreak of hostilities the British initiated a Naval Blockade of Germany, preventing supplies from reaching its ports. The strategy proved effective, cutting off vital military and civilian supplies, though this blockade violated generally accepted international law codified by several international agreements of the past two centuries. A blockade of stationed ships within a three-mile (5 km) radius was considered legitimate, however Britain mined international waters to prevent any ships from entering entire sections of ocean, causing danger to neutral ships. Since there was limited response to this tactic, Germany expected a similar response to its unrestricted submarine warfare.

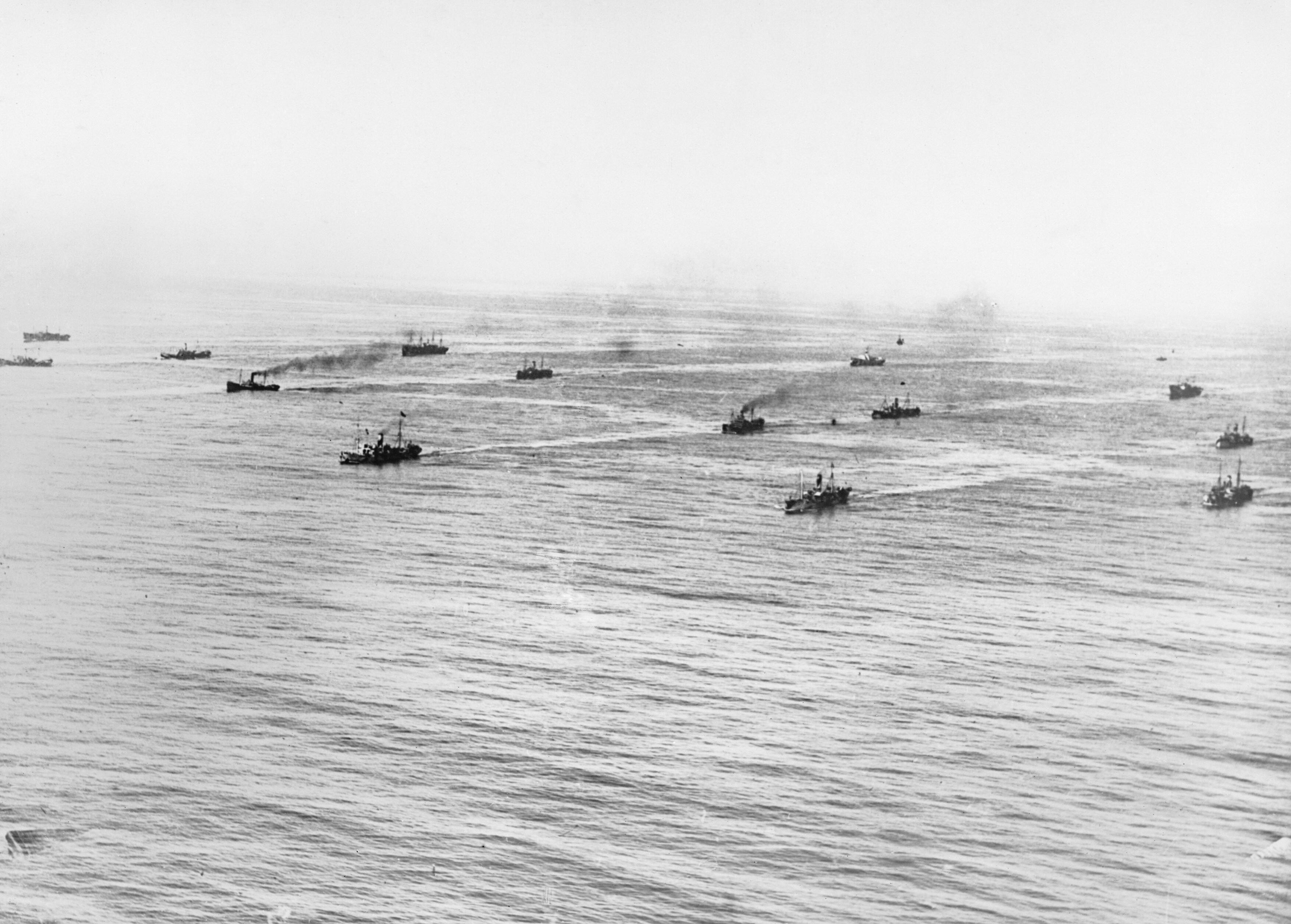
British convoy in the Atlantic during World War I

German U-boats attempted to cut the supply lines between North America and Britain during the First Battle of the Atlantic. The nature of submarine warfare meant that attacks often came without warning, giving the crews of the merchant ships little hope of survival. The United States launched a protest and Germany modified its rules of engagement. After the infamous sinking of the passenger ship RMS Lusitania in 1915, Germany promised not to target passenger liners. Britain armed its merchant ships. Finally in early 1917 Germany adopted a policy of unrestricted submarine warfare, realizing the Americans would eventually enter the war. Germany sought to strangle Allied sea lanes before the US could transport a large army overseas.

The U-boat threat lessened in 1917 when merchant ships travelled in convoys escorted by destroyers. This tactic made it difficult for U-boats to find targets. The accompanying destroyers might sink a submerged submarine with depth charges. The losses to submarine attacks were reduced significantly, but the convoys system slowed the flow of supplies. The solution to the delays was a massive programme to build new freighters. Troop ships were too fast for the submarines and did not travel the North Atlantic in convoys. The First World War also saw the first use of aircraft carriers in combat, with Furious launching Sopwith Camels in a successful raid against Zeppelin hangars at Tondern in July 1918.

==== Maritime events of World War II ====
In the North Atlantic, German U-boats again attempted to cut supply lines to Britain by sinking merchant ships. In the first four months of the war they sank more than 110 vessels. In addition to supply ships, the U-boats occasionally attacked British and Canadian warships. One U-boat sank the British carrier Courageous while another managed to sink the battleship Royal Oak at her home anchorage of Scapa Flow.

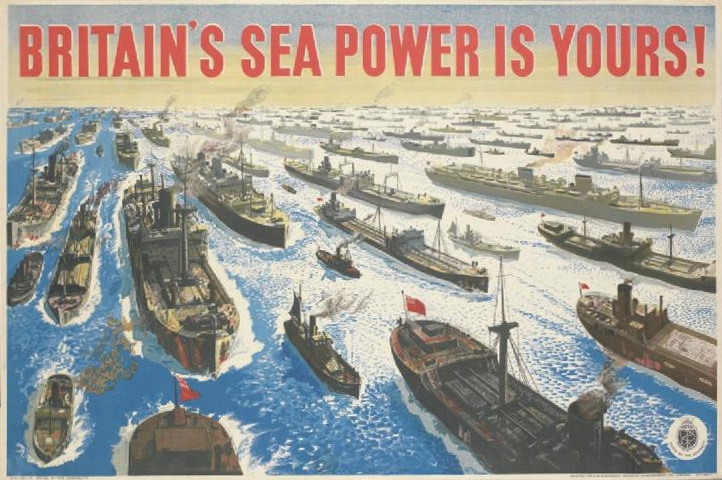
A WWII poster

In the early stages of the war the Royal Navy placed much faith in ASDIC (an early form of active sonar) to detect submerged U-boats but the Germans countered this by the use of the "wolfpack" which attacked on the surface at night. To form this pack, the U-boats communicated to their base by radio, to coordinate the action of several U-boats. The British eventually broke the German Naval code, which allowed this tactic to be defeated. The Germans then switched to attacking shipping off the American coast.

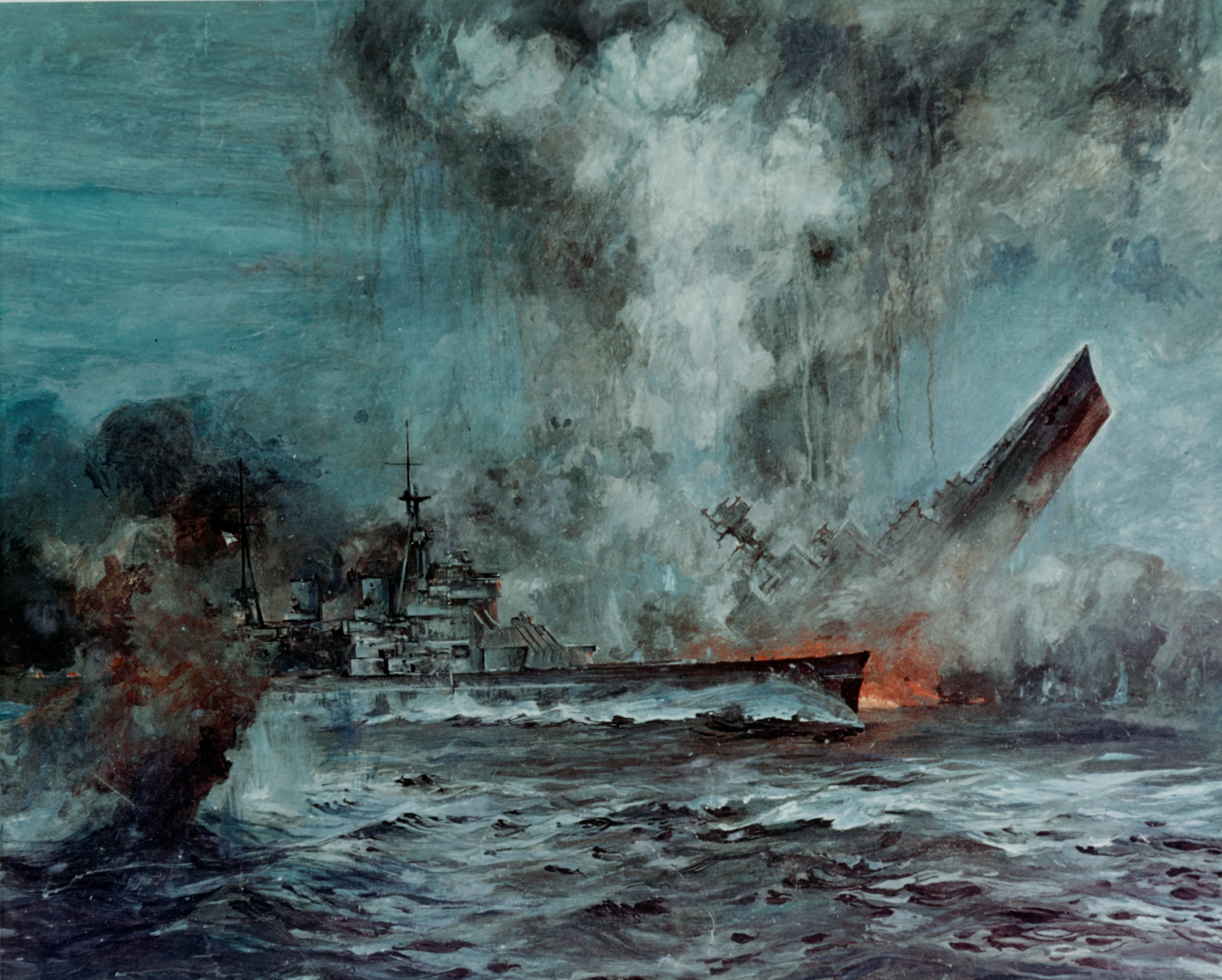
HMS Hood sinking after a catastrophic explosion during battle with Bismarck.

The British sank the Deutschland-class cruiser Admiral Graf Spee in December 1939 and the battleship Bismarck in 1941. However the threat caused by the Tirpitz was only countered later after many attacks. The Royal Navy suffered significant losses in the early stages of the war including the battlecruisers Hood, which had been sunk by Bismarck, and Repulse and the battleship Prince of Wales, both of which were sunk by Japanese bombers in late 1941.

The Royal Navy provided critical cover for the British and French troops during the Dunkirk evacuation and rescued the bulk of the troops, the remainder being evacuated by a fleet of small ships. Later the Navy provided cover for the Dieppe Raid catastrophe, that saw 3,623 of the 6,086 men who made it ashore killed, wounded, or captured.

In the summer of 1941, the Soviet Union entered the war on the side of Britain. Although the Soviets had tremendous reserves in manpower, they had lost much of their equipment and manufacturing base in the first few weeks following the German invasion. The Allies attempted to remedy this by sending Arctic convoys, which travelled from Britain and later the United States to the northern ports of the Soviet Union, Arkhangelsk (Archangel) and Murmansk. The treacherous route around the North Cape of Norway was the site of many battles as the Germans continually tried to disrupt the convoys using U-boats, bombers and surface ships.

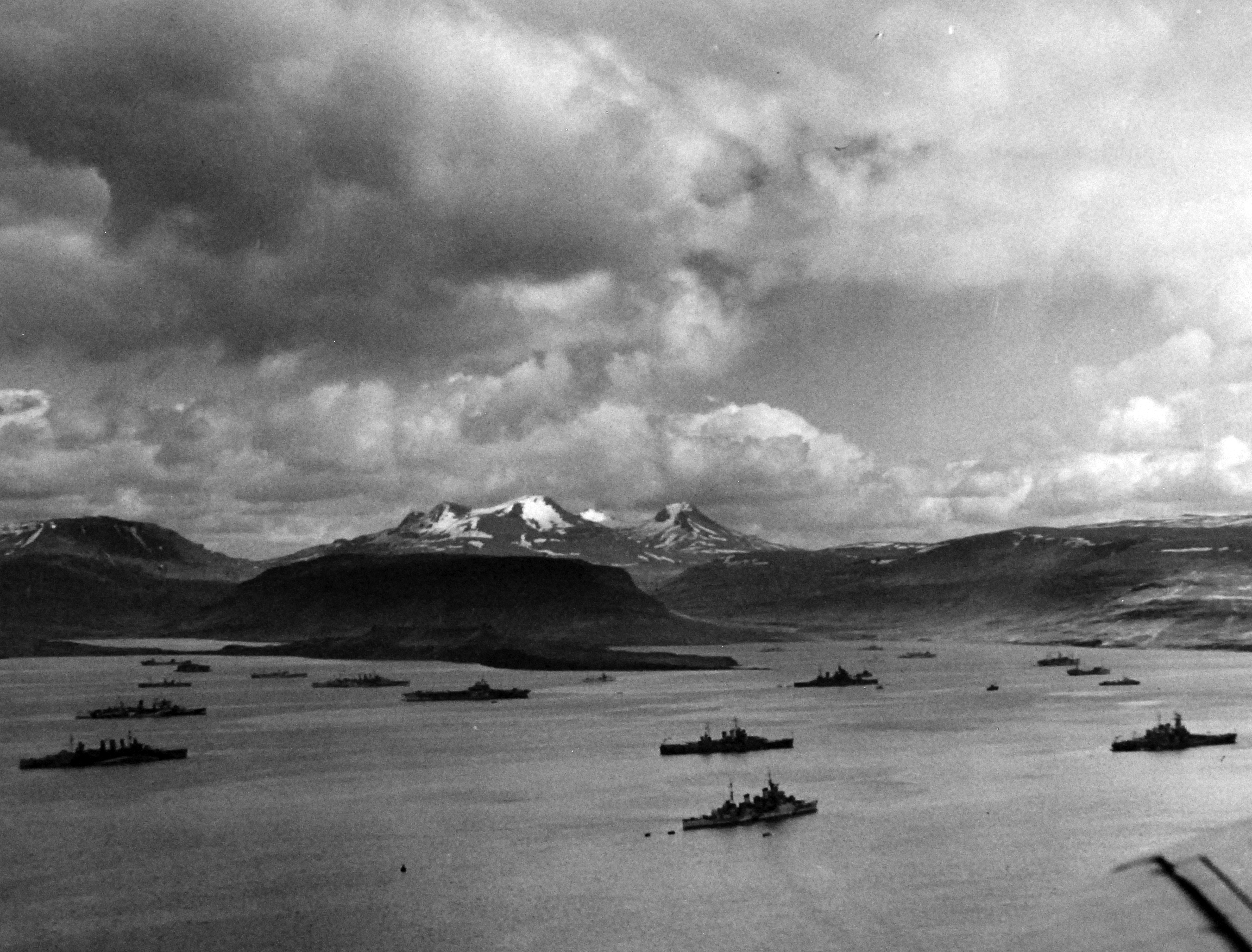
Allied Arctic convoy at anchor in the harbor at Hvalfjord, Iceland, May 1942

Malta was an important base for attacking the Axis supply lines to North Africa. Submarines, aircraft and surface ships were used from Maltese bases. In 1941 "Force K" was based in Malta which caused the Italians to suspend their convoys but the Germans insisted that they be resumed. Force K ran into a minefield and warships were also lost by attacks by U-boats and human torpedoes. Axis aircraft attacked Allied supply convoys to Malta and the situation became desperate. Eventually in 1942 "Operation Pedestal", 14 ships with a large escort was sent. However, only 5 ships got through and many escorts were lost. The renewed attacks by the submarine force prevented full use of the Axis held port of Tobruk and eventually to victory in North Africa. Gibraltar was also an important naval base, as was Alexandria.

In late 1941 Winston Churchill tried to prevent Japanese aggression against British territories in the Far East by sending a naval deterrent called "Force Z". The Royal Navy could only spare one new battleship, HMS Prince of Wales, an old battlecruiser HMS Repulse and the carrier HMS Indomitable. The latter hit an uncharted rock and was put out of action but Churchill insisted on the other two ships being sent. They arrived at Singapore on 2 December 1941. A day after the attack on Pearl Harbor, the ships with escorting destroyers sailed to attack Japanese transports. They were spotted by reconnaissance aircraft and eventually sunk by torpedoes from planes.

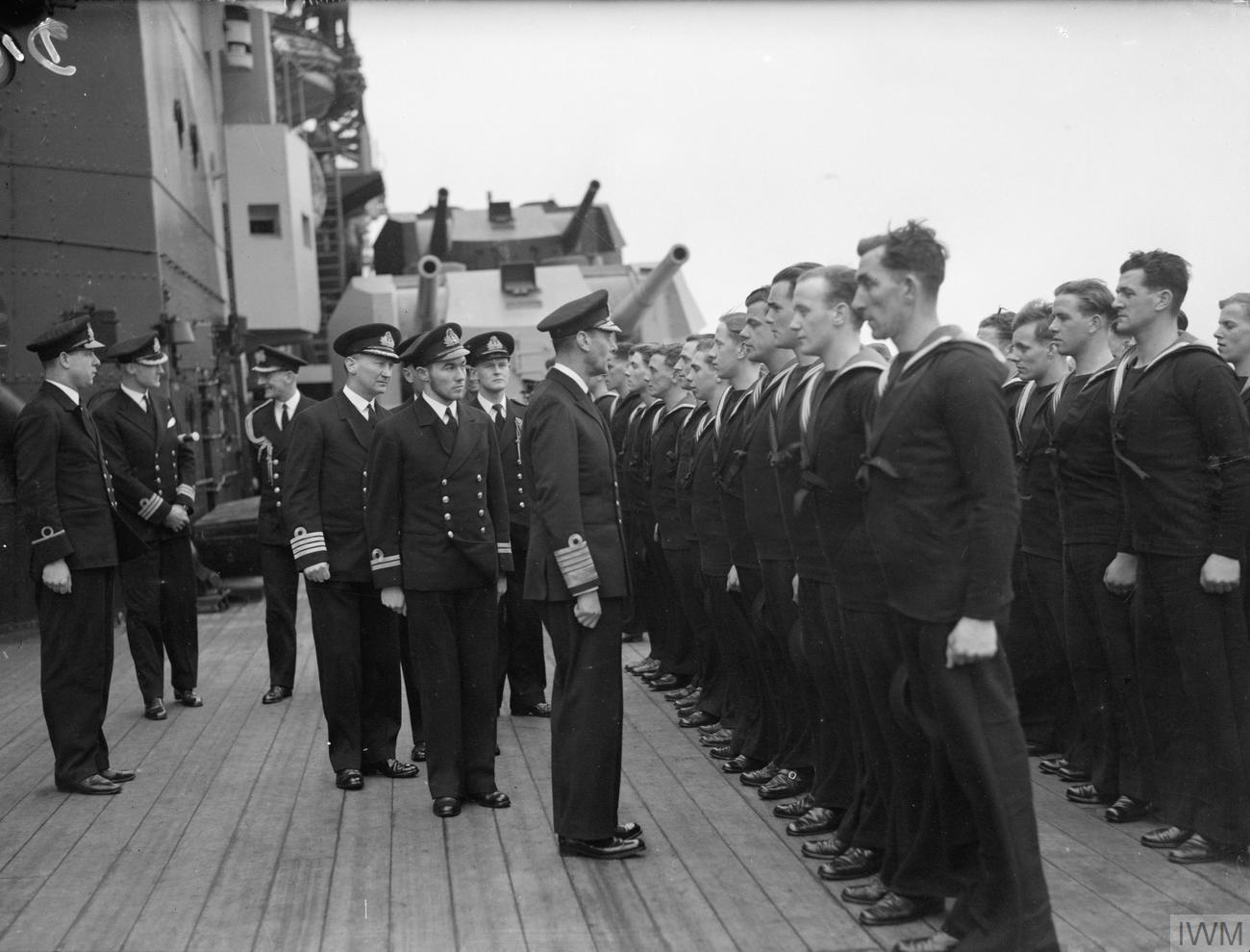
King George VI visiting the Home Fleet based at Scapa Flow, March 1943

The turning point in the "Second Battle of the Atlantic" was in early 1943 as the Allies refined their naval tactics, making effective use of new technology to counter the U-boats. The Allies produced ships faster than they were sunk and lost fewer ships by re-adopting the convoy system. Improved anti-submarine warfare meant that the life expectancy of a typical U-boat crew would be measured in months. The vastly improved Type 21 U-boat appeared at the end of the war but was too late to affect the outcome. In December 1943 the last major sea battle between the Royal Navy and the Kriegsmarine (War navy) took place. At the "Battle of North Cape" Germany's battleship Scharnhorst was sunk by HMS Duke of York, HMS Belfast and several destroyers.

For the D-Day landings in 1944 the Royal Navy provided most of the warships and three-quarters of the landing craft. After the German surrender, a force was sent to the Pacific Ocean to attack the Japanese.

==== Post World War II operations ====
Since the late 1950s, the United Kingdom became engaged in a protracted dispute with Iceland over fishing rights in North Atlantic waters. The Royal Navy, along with tugs from the MAFF and British civilian trawlers, was involved in three major confrontations with the Icelandic Coast Guard from 1958 to 1976. These largely bloodless clashes became known as the Cod Wars, and consisted in a series of close encounters and rammings between Icelandic gunboats and British frigates and tugs. A total of 15 Royal Navy warships and five Icelandic gunboats were damaged in different degrees during the third conflict only. The dispute ended in June 1976 with the recognition by Britain of Iceland's exclusive 200 nautical miles fishery zone.

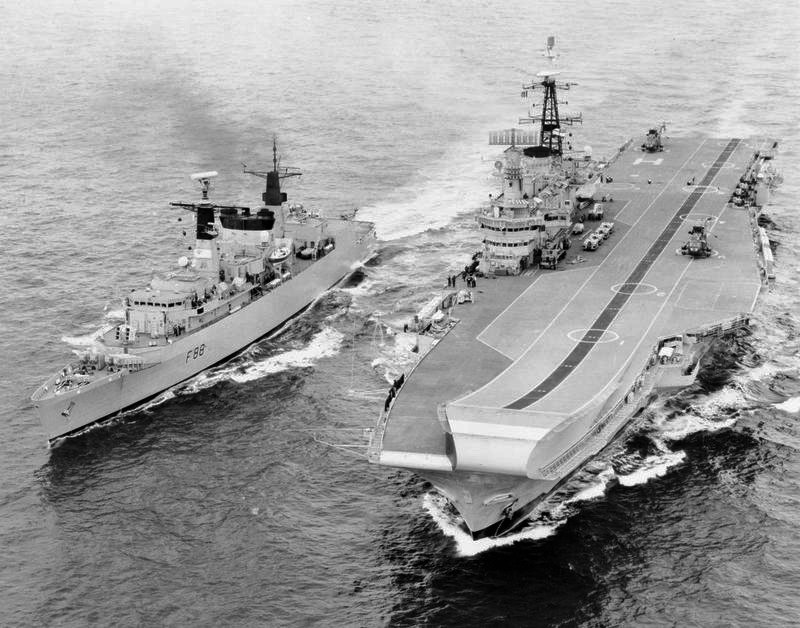
HMS Broadsword and HMS Hermes during the Falklands War

The Falklands War was fought in 1982 between Argentina and Britain over the disputed Falkland Islands, South Georgia and the South Sandwich Islands. Britain was initially taken by surprise by the Argentine attack on the South Atlantic islands, but launched a naval task force to engage the Argentine Navy and Air Force, and to retake the islands by amphibious assault. A Westland Lynx HAS.2. and three Westland Wasp HAS.1 from the Royal Navy disabled the Argentine submarine ARA Santa Fe with AS-12 air-to-surface missiles in South Georgia and nuclear submarine HMS Conqueror sank the light cruiser ARA General Belgrano, but lost the destroyers HMS Sheffield and HMS Coventry and the frigates HMS Ardent and HMS Antelope due to air attack. The Argentine airstrikes also sank the freighter Atlantic Conveyor, the logistic ship RFA Sir Galahad and an LCU landing craft from HMS Fearless. Another Argentine submarine, the ARA San Luis, launched a number of unsuccessful attacks on the British task force, which in turn expended 50 Mk 46 anti-submarine torpedoes during the conflict. The Argentine transport ARA Isla de los Estados was sunk by HMS Alacrity, while the coaster ARA Monsunen managed to slip away after a hot pursuit by the frigates HMS Yarmouth and HMS Broadsword. The assault force was landed at San Carlos Water, where Royal Navy warships and aircraft shot down 22 Argentine fighter-bombers. The British eventually prevailed and the islands returned to British control.

The Royal Navy took part in the 1990 Gulf War, the Kosovo War, the Afghanistan War and the 2003 Iraq War. In August 2005 the Royal Navy rescued seven Russians stranded in a submarine off the Kamchatka Peninsula. Using its Scorpio 45 remote-controlled mini-sub, the Russian submarine was freed from the fishing nets and cables that had held the submarine for three days.

== Notable individuals ==
=== Charles Hardy ===
Charles Hardy was a British naval officer and colonial governor. He was appointed governor and commander-in-chief of the British colony of Newfoundland in 1744. In 1758 he and James Wolfe attacked French posts around the mouth of the Saint Lawrence River and destroyed all of the French fishing stations along the northern shores of what is now New Brunswick and along the Gaspé Peninsula.

=== Augustus Keppel ===
Augustus Keppel, 1st Viscount Keppel was a British admiral who held sea command during the Seven Years' War and during the American Revolutionary War. In the final years of the latter conflict he served as First Lord of the Admiralty. During the Seven Years' War he had seen constant service. He was in North America in 1755, on the coast of France in 1756, was dispatched on a cruise to reduce the French settlements on the west coast of Africa in 1758 and his ship Neptune (1683) was the first to get into action at the Battle of Quiberon Bay in 1759. In 1757 he had formed part of the court-martial that had condemned Admiral John Byng, but was active among others who endeavoured to secure a pardon for him. However, neither he nor those who had acted with him could produce any serious reason why the sentence should not be carried out. When Spain joined France in 1762 he was sent as second in command with Sir George Peacock in the expedition which took Havana. His health suffered from the fever which carried off an immense proportion of the soldiers and sailors, but the £25,000 of prize money which he received freed him from the unpleasant position of a younger son of a family ruined by the extravagance of his father.

=== Edward Hawke ===
Edward Hawke, 1st Baron Hawke was a naval officer of the Royal Navy. During the War of the Austrian Succession he was promoted to Rear admiral. In the Seven Years' War Hawke replaced Admiral John Byng as commander in the Mediterranean.

=== Richard Howe ===
Richard Howe, 1st Earl Howe was a British admiral. During the rebellion in North America, Howe was known to be sympathetic to the colonists. He had in prior years sought the acquaintance of Benjamin Franklin, who was a friend of Howe's sister, a popular lady in London society. During his career Howe displayed an uncommon tactical originality. His performance was unexcelled even by Nelson who, like Howe's other successors, was served by more highly trained squadrons and benefitted from Howe's concepts.

=== Horatio Nelson ===
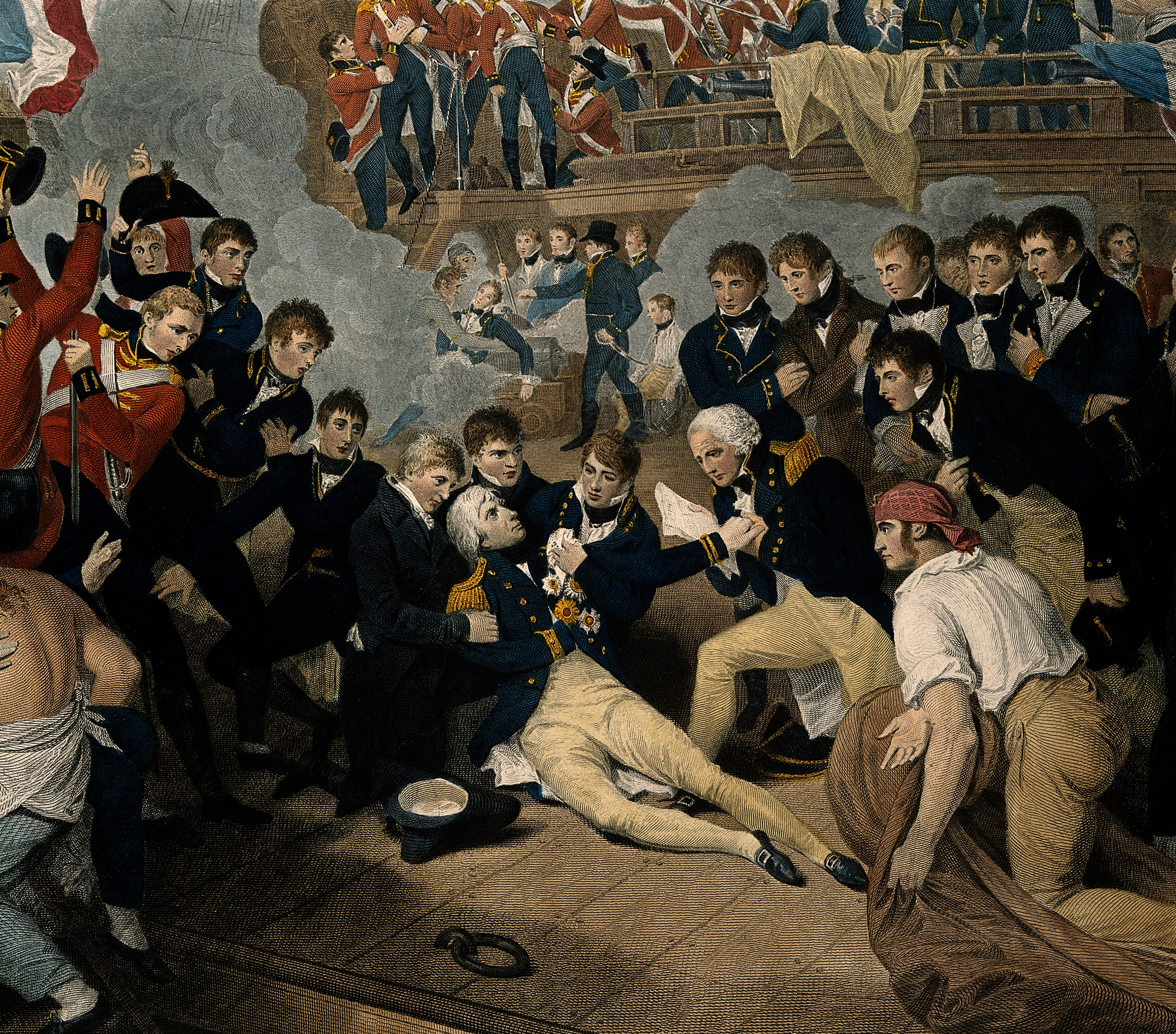
Nelson is shot on the quarterdeck during the Battle of Trafalgar

Horatio Nelson, 1st Viscount Nelson was a British admiral who was famous for his participation in the sea battles of the Napoleonic Wars, most notably at the Battle of Trafalgar a decisive British victory where he lost his life. He was born in 1758 in Norfolk and in 1771 joined Raisonnable (1768). By the time he was 20 he had been to the Arctic, the Indies and the Caribbean. He was appointed Lieutenant in 1777, Post-Captain in 1779 and Commodore in 1796. He took part in the campaign in Corsica in 1794 where he lost his right eye. In 1797 he was at the battle of Cape St. Vincent at which he was promoted Rear Admiral of the Blue. That year he lost his right arm after the raid on Santa Cruz, Tenerife and was knighted. In 1798 he fought the French fleet at the Battle of the Nile in Abu Qir Bay, Egypt and was given the title "Baron of the Nile".

Nelson was noted for his considerable ability to inspire and bring out the best in his men, to the point that it gained a name "The Nelson Touch". His actions during these battles meant that before and after his death he was revered like few military figures have been throughout British history. Alexander Davidson was a contemporary and close friend of Nelson and is responsible for several acts that glorified Nelson's public image. These included the creation of a medal commemorating the victory at the Battle of Trafalgar and the creation of the Nelson Memorial at his estate in Swarland, Northumberland. As a close friend of the Admiral he acted as an intermediary when Nelson's marriage to his wife Frances Nelson fell apart due in large part to his affair with Emma Hamilton.

=== Hyde Parker ===
In 1778 Sir Hyde Parker was engaged in the Savannah expedition, and in the following year his ship was wrecked on the hostile Cuban coast. His men, however, entrenched themselves and in the end were brought off safely. Parker was with his father, Sir Hyde Parker, 5th Baronet at the Dogger Bank and with Richard Howe in the two actions in the Strait of Gibraltar. In 1793, having just become Rear Admiral, he served under Sir Samuel Hood at Toulon and in Corsica. Two years later, now a Vice Admiral, he took part under William Hotham in the indecisive fleet actions in 1795. From 1796 to 1800 he was in command at Jamaica and ably conducted the operations in the West Indies.

=== Edward Pellew ===
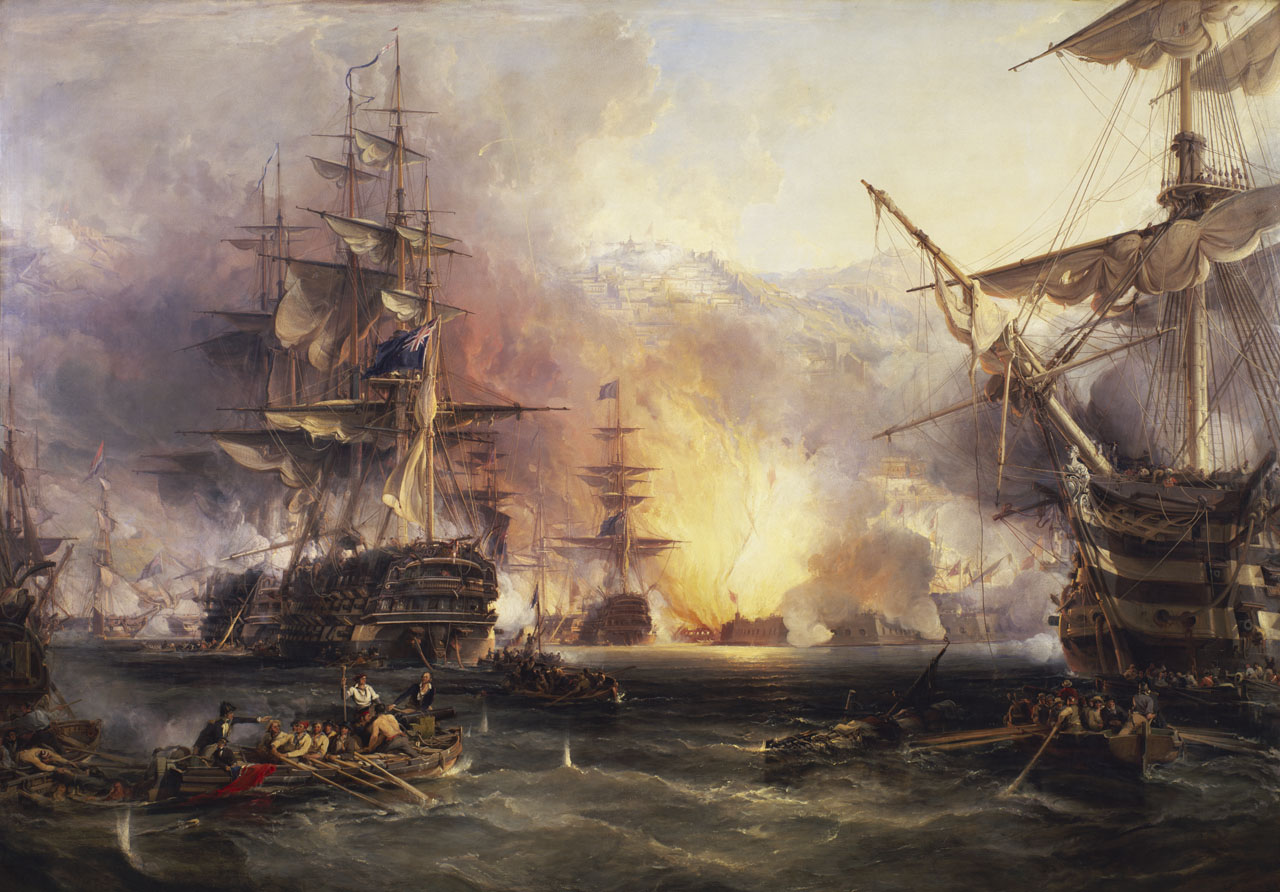
Bombardment of Algiers. Edward Pellew led an Anglo-Dutch fleet against the Barbary states.

Edward Pellew, 1st Viscount Exmouth, was a British naval officer who fought during the American War of Independence, the French Revolutionary War and the Napoleonic Wars. Pellegrew is remembered as an officer and gentleman, earning his land and titles through courage, leadership and skill - serving as a paradigm of the versatility and determination of naval officers during the Napoleonic Wars.

=== James Saumarez ===
James Saumarez, 1st Baron de Saumarez was an admiral of the Royal Navy, notable for his victory at the Battle of Algeciras Bay. In 1801 he was raised to the rank of Rear Admiral of the Blue, was created a baronet and received the command of a small squadron which was destined to watch the movements of the Spanish fleet at Cádiz. Between 6 and 12 July he performed a brilliant piece of service, in which after a first repulse at Algeciras he routed a much superior combined force of French and Spanish ships at the Battle of Algeciras Bay. For his services Saumarez received the Order of the Bath and the Freedom of the City of London.

=== William Dampier ===
William Dampier made voyages from Weymouth to Newfoundland, Java, Jamaica and Honduras. From his experiences he wrote a book A New Voyage Around The World that was much admired and resulted in his command of the first voyage of exploration organised by the Admiralty. He reached Australia but found no wealth so it was not a success. Dampier later took up privateering and rescued Alexander Selkirk, which was the basis for Robinson Crusoe.

=== James Cook ===
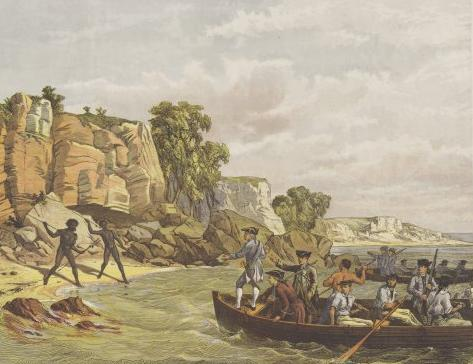
Cook's landing at Botany Bay in 1770

James Cook was born in Yorkshire in 1728. Having worked in a shop, he decided that a life at sea was what he wanted and he became apprenticed to a firm of Whitby coal shippers. He then joined the navy as a seaman and worked his way up to command. The Royal Society wanted to observe the transit of Venus due in June 1769 and to find the supposed southern continent. They persuaded the Admiralty to provide a ship and James Cook, a navigator who had prepared charts of the St Lawrence river. For the voyage Cook chose the HM Bark Endeavour which was a Whitby collier. It was adapted in the Royal Navy Dockyard at Deptford, and scientific instruments for observing the transit were loaded. Accompanying Cook were the astronomer Dr Green, a botanist Joseph Banks and two artists. The Endeavour sailed around Cape Horn to Tahiti, then to New Zealand and finally to Australia. After a year at home, Cook took two colliers, Resolution and Adventure, to the Antarctic and then to Tahiti, testing the new timekeeper of John Harrison. He made a third voyage, to try to find the Northwest Passage, with Resolution and HMS Discovery. After encountering ice he turned back to Hawaii. There he was treated as a god but on leaving was forced to return. When Cook tried to take the king hostage, because of the theft of a ship's boat, he was killed on 14 February 1779.

=== George Vancouver ===
George Vancouver was born in King's Lynn in 1757. He became a captain in the Royal Navy and carried out surveys of the west coast of America, using a different ship also called the Discovery (1789), of Australia and New Zealand. Both the city of Vancouver and Vancouver Island are named after him. He also negotiated agreements with the king of Hawaii but died at the age of 40.

=== Admiral Anson ===
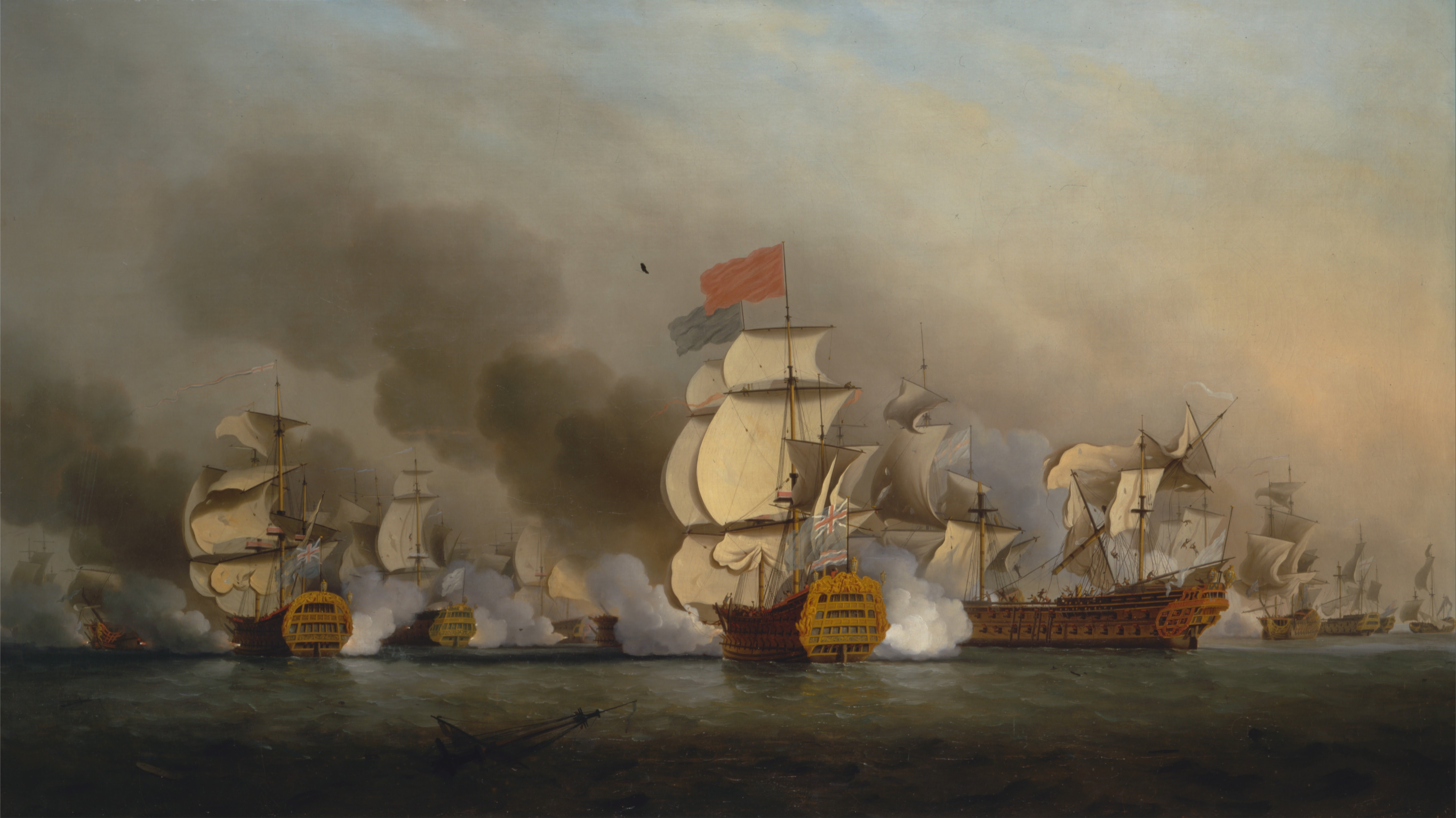
The First Battle of Cape Finisterre in May 1747 during the War of the Austrian Succession

George Anson, 1st Baron Anson took a squadron of British ships around Cape Horn in 1740–4 to harass the Spanish. He captured several ships, raided the Philippines and visited Canton (now Guangzhou). He returned with much gold and silver to great acclaim.

=== Sir John Franklin ===
John Franklin was an officer in the Royal Navy and an Arctic explorer. He was born in 1786 and joined the navy at the age of 16. He sailed on Matthew Flinders voyages around Australia and took part in the Battle of Trafalgar, but is best remembered for his four Arctic voyages. He made maps of over 3,000 miles (4,800 km) of the coast of northern Canada. On his final voyage in 1845 he had two ships the Erebus and the Terror. He was seen off Baffin Island but then disappeared. Various expeditions were mounted to find him and his crew. One expedition met Inuit who said that the ships had been crushed in the ice. Messages from the explorers were found but all later died. Franklin had died in 1847 and the remainder had tried to travel south. Robert McClure completed the route in 1850.

=== James Clark Ross ===
James Clark Ross surveyed Victoria Land in Antarctica in 1842. The Ross Sea and Ross Island are named after him as is a ship of the British Antarctic Survey.

=== Robert Scott ===
Robert Falcon Scott surveyed the Great Ice Barrier in the Antarctic in 1901–4 in RRS Discovery. He died in 1910 on the journey back from the South Pole.

=== Ernest Shackleton ===
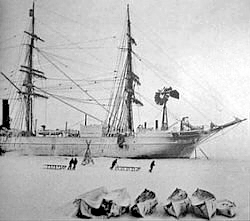
Discovery in Antarctic water

Ernest Shackleton led an expedition to try to cross Antarctica in 1914. His ship became crushed in the ice but he led 28 men to safety on Elephant Island. To get help Shackleton and six men crossed 800 nautical miles (1,500 km) of sea in an open boat to South Georgia and then crossed the mountains to Grytviken. He returned to rescue all his men from Elephant Island. He died on South Georgia in 1922.

== Shipbuilding ==
At the time of the creation of the United Kingdom, England had important royal dockyards at Harwich, Sheerness and Plymouth. A mechanised block mill was set up at Portsmouth in 1806 that was cheaper and faster than producing them by hand. As shipbuilding centres in the north east of England expanded, those in East Anglia declined.

Ship sizes increased in the 19th century due to the change from wood to iron and then steel. Yards in the north east and in Scotland became dominant. British yards produced the majority of the world's shipping at the end of the century, mostly tramp steamers.

In 1913 Britain had 61% of the world market, with 40% in 1920 but this had declined to 0.7% in 1997. Modernisation of the shipyards took place in the 1960s allowing construction of supertankers. The British yards were nationalised as part of the Aircraft and Shipbuilding Industries Act 1977 and renamed "British Shipbuilders" but were privatised again in the 1980s. Rosyth Dockyard was started in 1909 while HMNB Clyde (Faslane) submarine base was created in the 1960s. American nuclear submarines were based in Holy Loch but have since left.

== Famous ships ==
=== Cutty Sark ===
The Cutty Sark was a clipper ship built in 1869 in Dumbarton, Scotland, to carry 600 tons of cargo. She raced the Thermopylae and other clippers in the tea trade from China and later in the wool trade from Australia. She was capable of sailing at over 17 knots (31 km/h). Built as a full-rigged ship, she spent her final trading years as a barquentine. She was dismasted in 1916 but restored in 1922 then used as a training ship. Cutty Sark was taken over by a preservation society in 1952 and moved to Greenwich. In 2007 she was damaged by fire during restoration work but is now repaired and offers visitors tours as well as a souvenir shop and a coffee shop.

=== Endeavour ===
HM Bark Endeavour was built in 1768 as a collier at Whitby. She was a full-rigged ship and sturdily built with a large hold. Endeavour's flat-bottomed hull was well suited for sailing in shallow water and was designed to be beached. She was acquired by the Royal Navy, and after a major refit at Deptford she was used by James Cook on his first voyage to the Pacific Ocean. She ran aground on "Endeavour Reef" in the Great Barrier Reef but was refloated and repaired. On her return to Britain, Endeavour was used as a store ship and then sold out of the navy and used as a merchant ship. Her later fate is uncertain.

A replica of Endeavour was built in Fremantle from the original drawings, starting in 1988. This was completed in 1994 and Endeavour undertook a voyage to Whitby where she stayed from 1997 to 2003. She is now at the Australian National Maritime Museum in Sydney.

=== Great Britain ===
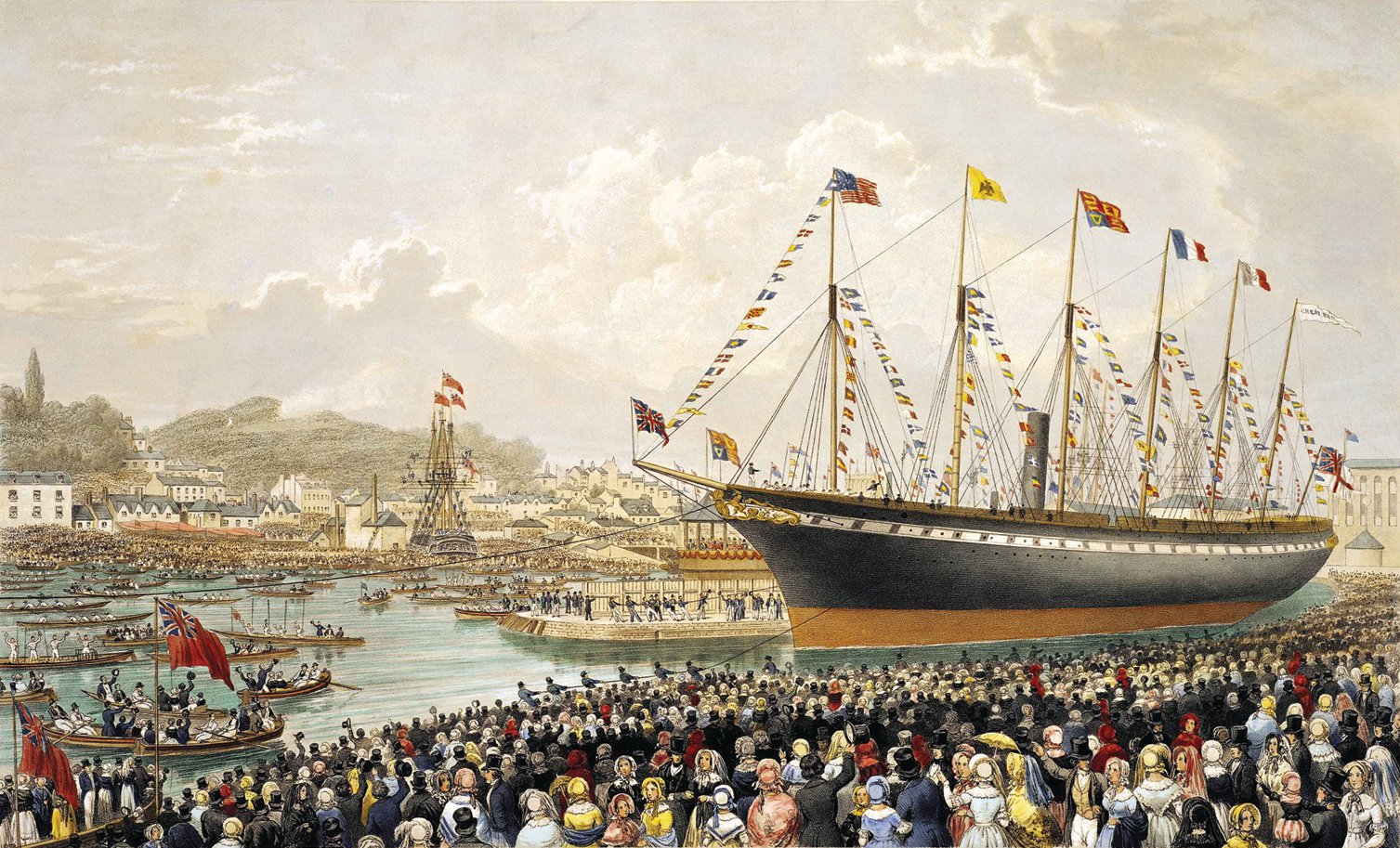
The 1843 launch of the Great Britain

The SS Great Britain was Isambard Kingdom Brunel's second ship design, after a wooden paddle steamer called the SS Great Western. She was the first steamship to make regular crossings of the Atlantic. This was the first large iron steamship and the first to use a screw propeller. After a long career she was abandoned in the Falkland Islands but was brought back to the drydock in Bristol in which she was built. There she has been restored.

=== Great Eastern ===
The SS Great Eastern was launched in 1858 and was six times bigger than any ship before. She was the third ship designed by Brunel. The Great Eastern had six masts as well as coal fired engines driving paddle wheels. It was designed to carry enough coal to travel to Australia and return, and was intended to carry 4,000 passengers (or 10,000 soldiers). Work started on the ship in 1854 but there were many problems in building and launching the ship. After fitting out at Deptford she undertook trials in September 1859 but the heater attached to the paddle engine boilers exploded. As the ship had been fitted with watertight bulkheads she survived and was repaired. Because of the opening of the Suez Canal, she was not used on the Australian route as envisaged but on the Atlantic crossings. Passengers did not like the rolling in storms and she was sold to a cable laying company after only six years. The Great Eastern was used to lay the first transatlantic telegraph cable and many others subsequently. She was broken up in 1888.

=== Titanic ===
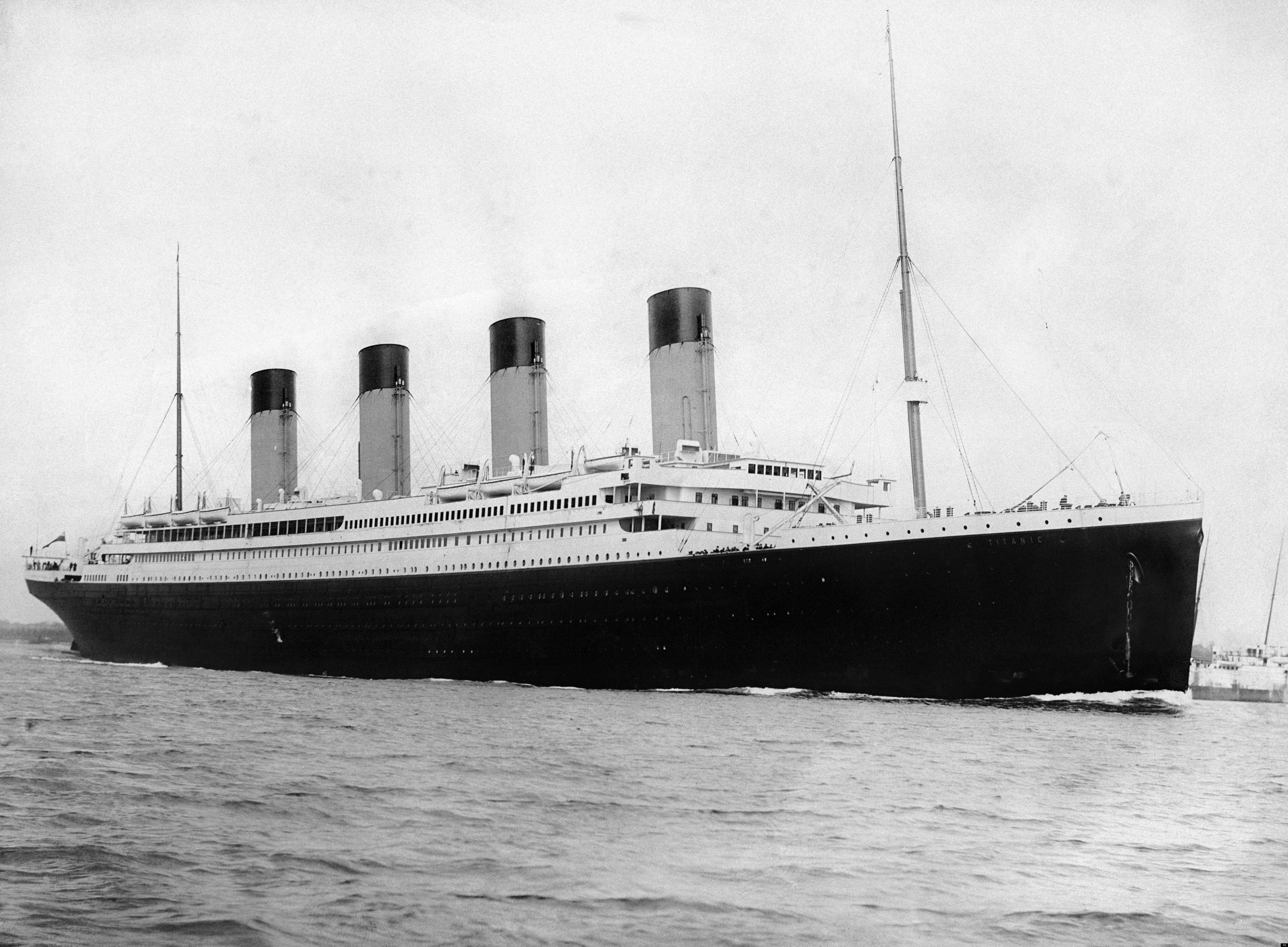
Titanic departing Southampton on 10 April 1912

The Titanic and her sister ships Olympic and Britannic were built the White Star Line to outdo the Mauretania and Lusitania which belonged to the rival Cunard Line. Titanic was 269 m long and weight 45,000 tons. She was described as a luxury hotel at sea and as "unsinkable". She was fitted with a double bottom and 16 watertight compartments so that even if two were flooded she would not sink. Titanic departed from Southampton on 10 April 1912 on her maiden voyage to America. She called at Cherbourg and then Queenstown (now Cobh) before heading for New York City. Despite warnings of icebergs, she continued at 24 knots (44 km/h) on the night of 14 April. About midnight she hit an iceberg and five compartments started to flood. Two hours afterwards she sank. There were only enough lifeboats for half the passengers and about 1,500 people perished. In 1985 her wreck was identified by sonar 4,000 m down and explored using a remotely operated vehicle (ROV). Many objects from the wreck have been recovered.

=== Queen Mary ===
RMS Queen Mary was built in 1936 by John Brown & Company in Clydebank, Scotland for what is now the Cunard Line. She made runs across the Atlantic between Southampton, Cherbourg and New York City in partnership with Queen Elizabeth. The Queen Mary was used as a troop ship in the Second World War, carrying 16,082 people on one voyage. After the war she resumed Atlantic runs but these became loss making. She was withdrawn from service in 1967 and is now in Long Beach California as a hotel and tourist attraction.

=== Britannia ===
HMY Brittania was the name given to two yachts owned by the British royal family. The last one of these was built in 1953 and served the British royal family for nearly 43 years. Britannia is 5862 tons with an overall length of 412 feet (126 m). During her time in service she steamed 71 million miles. She has been preserved in port at Leith in Scotland. She was designed to be used as a hospital ship in time of war but did not undertake this role.

=== Victory ===
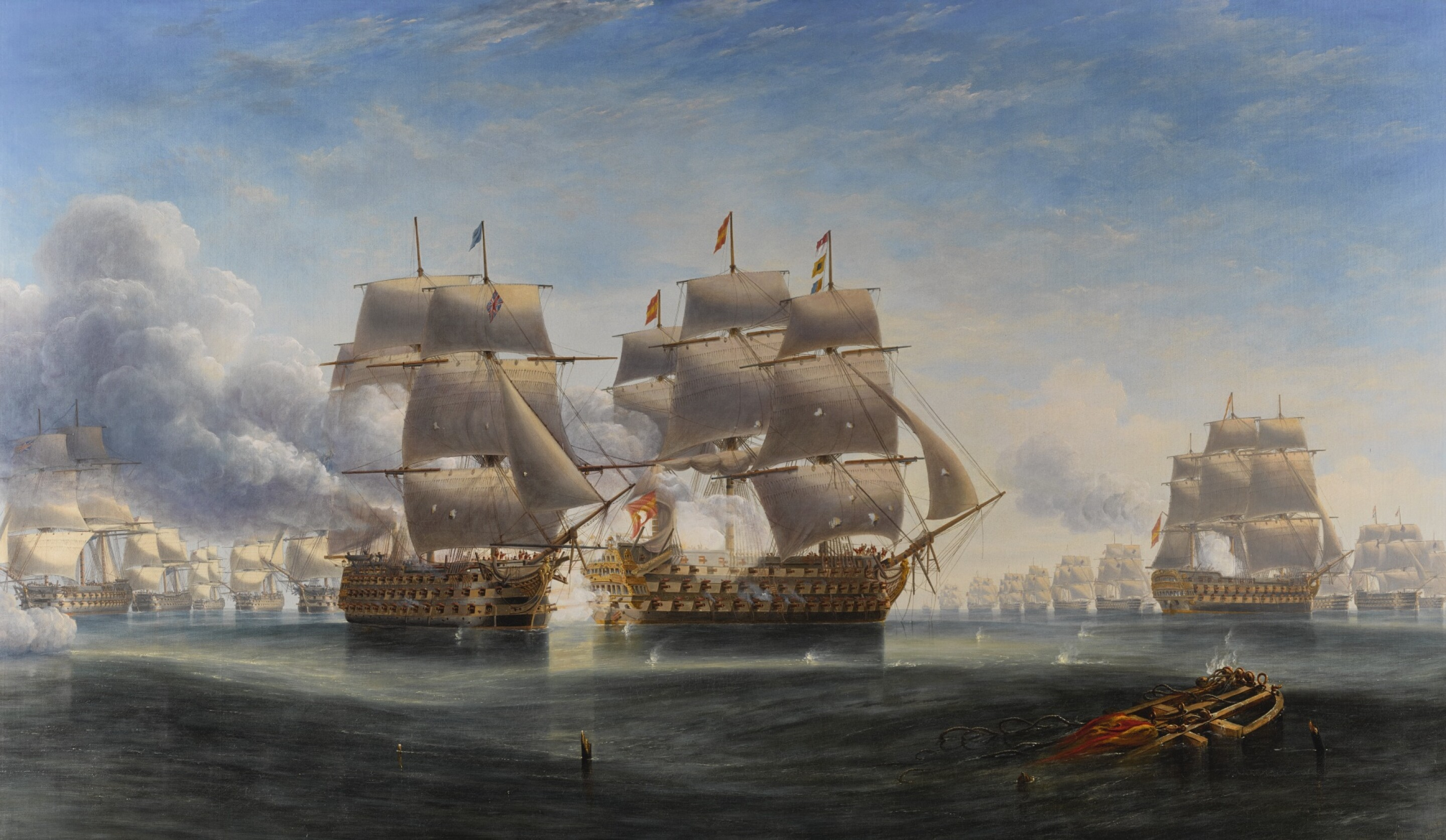
The opening engagement at the Battle of Trafalgar

HMS Victory was built between 1759 and 1765 at Chatham Dockyard with over 100 guns. She fought at Ushant in 1778 and 1781, and at Cape St. Vincent in 1796. Victory was reconstructed in 1798 with more guns and then fought at the Battle of Trafalgar in 1805. Later she sailed on many naval expeditions. However, in 1889, Victory became home to the "Naval School of Telegraphy". She got into a poor state and was restored 1922–8. Victory is now in drydock at HMNB Portsmouth (Portsmouth Historic Dockyard), where she received some damage in the Second World War. Victory is still the flagship of the Second Sea Lord.

=== Warrior ===
HMS Warrior was built in 1860 in response to the French ship La Gloire. She was the first iron-hulled ironclad, with three skins of iron, teak and iron. Warrior was broadside firing with 9 ton muzzle loading guns. She was described by Napoleon III as a "black snake amongst the rabbits". Her construction started a revolution in shipbuilding which meant that she was soon outclassed. She ended her days as an oil jetty at Pembroke Dock but was restored and has been on display since the 1980s at HMNB Portsmouth.

=== Belfast ===
HMS Belfast is a Town-class cruiser launched in 1938. At the start of the Second World War she was part of the force mounting a blockade on Germany. After sustaining mine damage she was reconstructed and became the heaviest cruiser of the class at 11553 tons. Belfast fought in the Battle of North Cape against the Scharnhorst and took part in operations against Tirpitz. She was part of the bombardment force during the D-Day landings and later served in the Far East. Belfast also took part in the Korean War. Belfast was then modernised and went to the Far East again. She was paid off from the Royal Navy in 1963 and is now a museum ship on the River Thames at London.

== Navigation ==
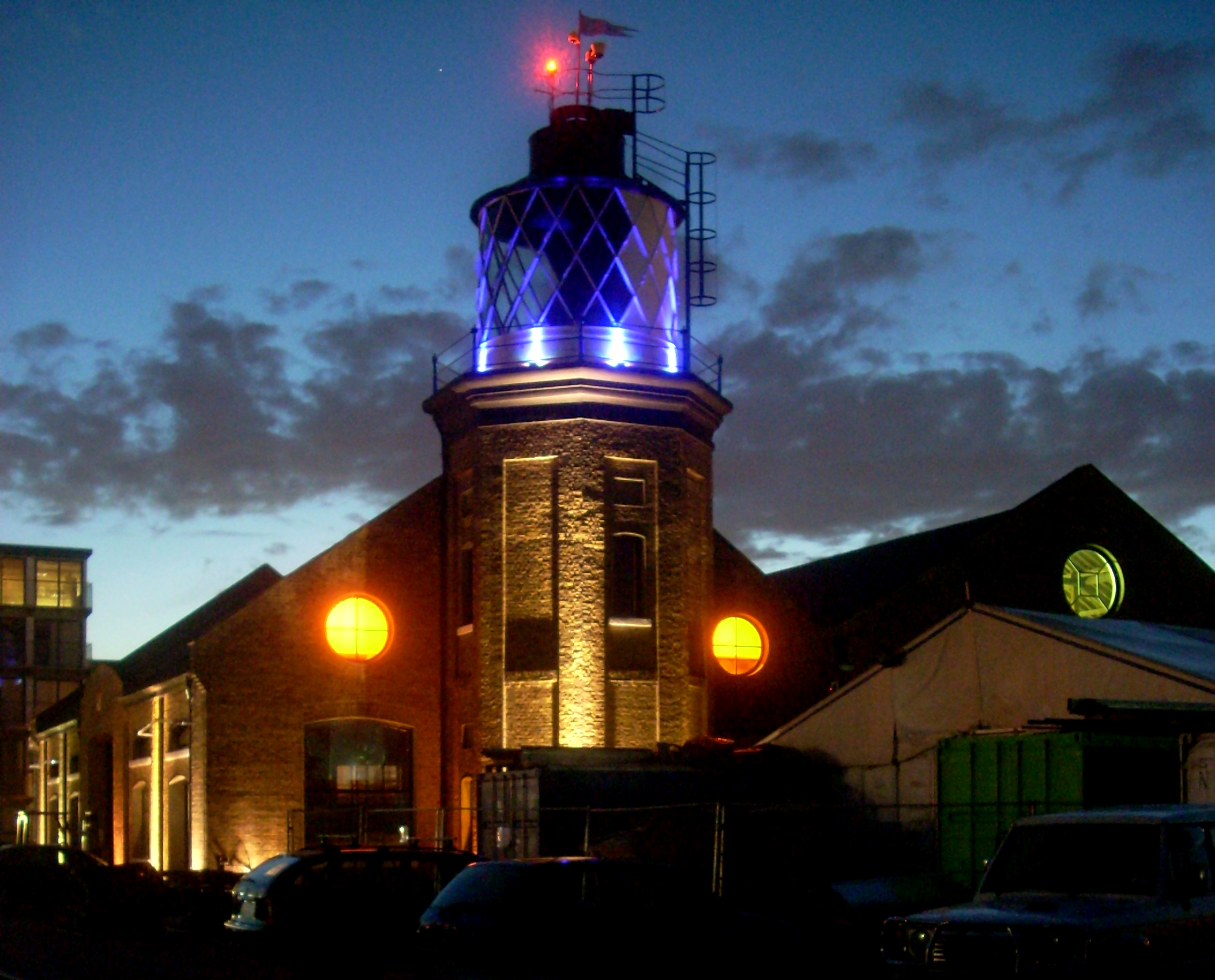
The surviving one of a pair of experimental lighthouses at Trinity Buoy Wharf, used by Michael Faraday and later used for training (closed 1988)

=== Instruments and guides ===
Between 1735 and 1760 John Harrison developed four types of marine chronometers for use at sea to allow accurate determination of longitude.

The gyrocompass was introduced in 1908.

=== Lighthouses ===
The first offshore lighthouse was that built on the Eddystone Rocks in 1699. This was washed away in a great storm but a replacement was built. As its foundations were unsatisfactory it was taken down and rebuilt on Plymouth Hoe. The third lighthouse on the reef still stands. The first lightship was positioned at the Nore in 1732. Foghorns were incorporated in the 19th century to provide warning in low visibility. In the late 19th and early 20th century underwater bells were used as warning devices.

=== Navigation marks ===
Trinity House of Deptford was founded in 1514 to look after navigation marks in the Thames Estuary. Similar organisations were founded at other places later. These were subsequently amalgamated and its authority was increased in 1836. Trinity House now looks after most of the marks in England and Wales, with the Northern Lighthouse Board in Scotland and the Commissioners of Irish Lights for the whole of Ireland.

=== Electronic navigation ===
Ship's radar started to be used during WWII, though it was primarily for military use. After 1945 when it came off the secret list, it was used commercially by the merchant fleets. Radar is also used on land for monitoring the position of shipping, for example in the Strait of Dover which is the busiest area of sea in the world.

The Decca Navigator System was a hyperbolic radio navigation system for commercial use that was installed in the decades after WWII, when it had come off the secret list. It had been used to sweep and mark the channels for the D-Day invasion Operation Overlord. After the end of World War II the Decca Navigator Co. Ltd. was formed to enable commercial use, and the system expanded rapidly, particularly in areas of British influence. It gave unparalleled accuracy until the advent of GPS satellite-based systems. At its peak it was deployed in many of the world's major shipping areas. More than 15,000 receiving sets were in use aboard ships in 1970. There were 4 transmitting "chains" around England, 1 in Ireland and 2 in Scotland, 12 in Scandinavia and a number elsewhere in the world. It was only phased out after the USA GPS signals became available for public use in 2001.

Electronic echo sounding was introduced in the 1930s to determine water depth and was useful in shallow waters.

== Safety and rescue ==
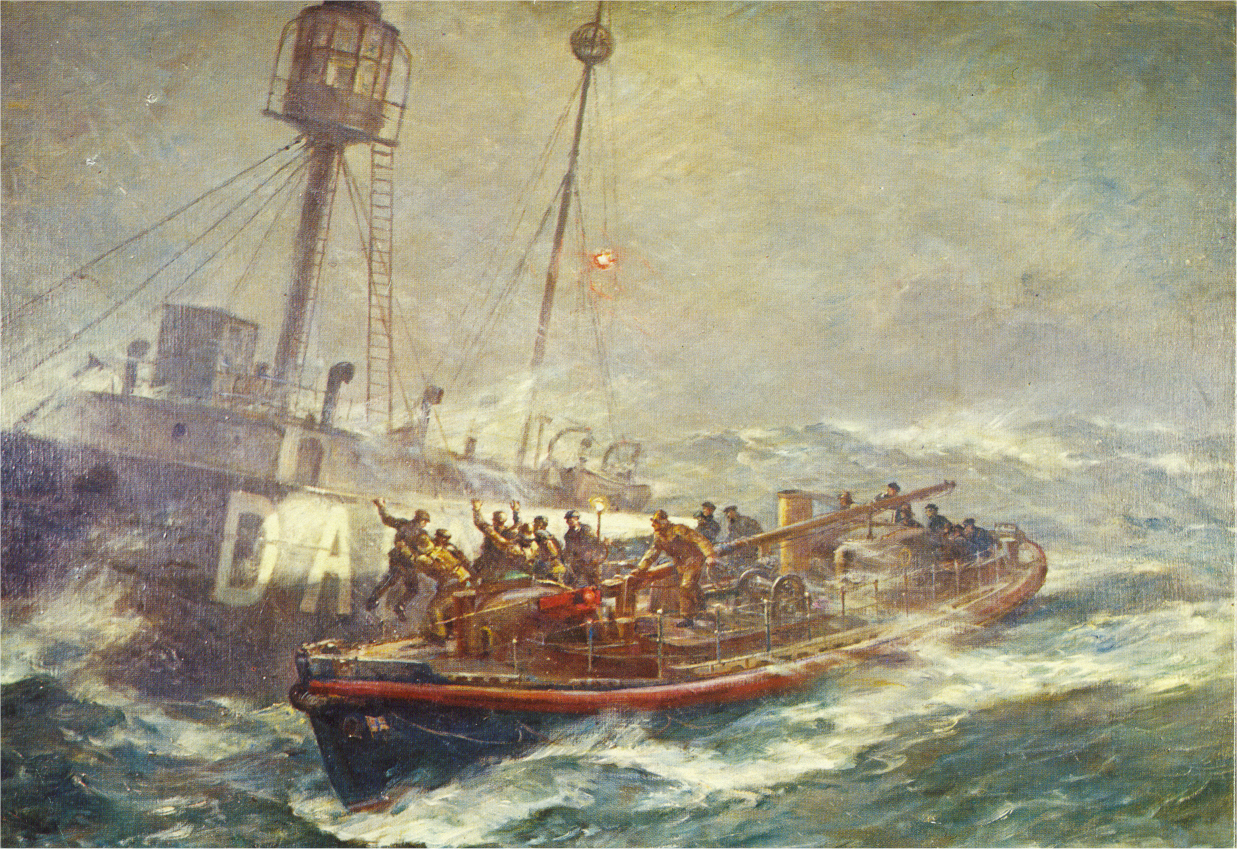
1974 postage stamp marking the Royal National Lifeboat Institution's 150th anniversary (rescue of Daunt Lightship's crew by Ballycotton lifeboat RNLB Mary Stanford. Artist: B. F. Gribble)

=== Plimsoll line ===
In the 19th century it was sometimes the practice to send heavily insured "coffin ships" to sea that were old, poorly maintained and overloaded. In 1868 Samuel Plimsoll became concerned by the scandal and published Our Seamen which revealed the situation. A load line (which became known as the Plimsoll Line) was required by the Merchant Shipping Act 1876 (39 & 40 Vict. c. 80) but it was not until 1890 that the Board of Trade became responsible for determining where it should be.

=== Lifeboats ===
There were some locally organised lifeboats in the 18th century, the first being in 1789 as a result of a tragic accident at the entrance to the River Tyne. The Royal National Lifeboat Institution was founded by Sir William Hillary in 1824 and is financed voluntarily. It maintains many lifeboats and lifeboat stations around the coast of Britain, the stations being run by paid engineers but mostly manned by local volunteers. An exception is the station at Spurn Head which is isolated so it is manned fully by paid crew. The boats were rowed with oars until the 1890s when steam-driven boats began to be introduced. Nowadays there are large diesel-driven offshore boats and small fast inshore boats. In some places hovercraft are used for rescues. The RNLI boats cooperate with the other rescue services, particularly the rescue helicopters.

=== Maritime and Coastguard Agency ===
The Maritime and Coastguard Agency was formed in 1998 to look after safety in British waters. It coordinates the search rescue services and determines safety standards. It incorporated the Coastguard Agency, that had been formed from Her Majesty's Coastguard, and the Marine Safety Agency.

== Ports and harbours ==
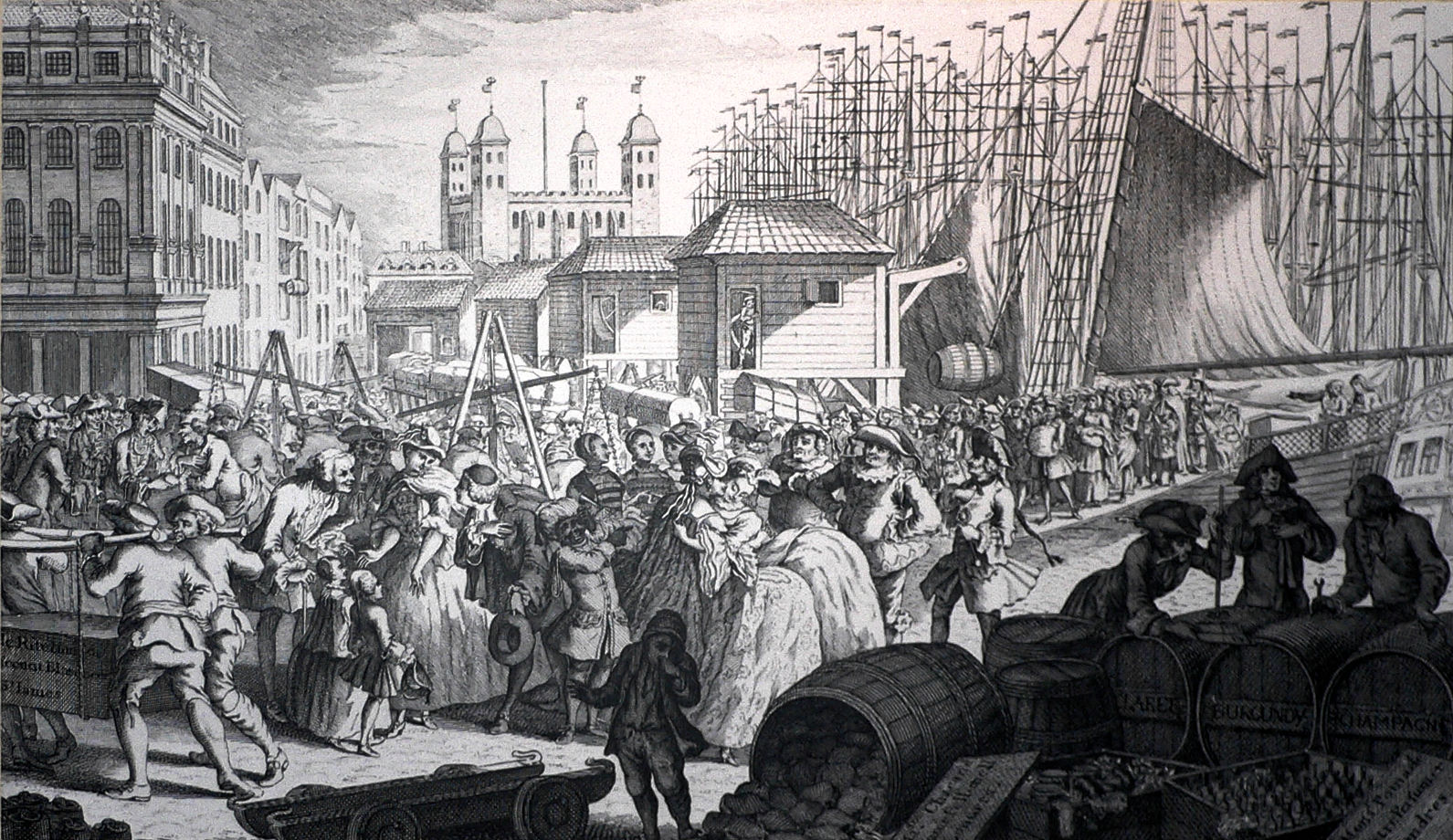
Legal Quays (Pool of London) in 1757, by Louis Peter Boitard.

Around the coast of Britain there are hundreds of ports and harbours, varying from the tiny (such as Porlock Weir) to the large (such as the Port of Felixstowe). Ships were also simply drawn up on beaches. Over the centuries the relative importance of each port and harbour has changed due to such factors as silting and trade alterations. In later periods deep water access has been a major factor in determining a port's success.

In the 18th century there were major harbour improvements with dredging of channels and construction of piers. Wet docks were built at London, Liverpool, Hull and Bristol.

London was still the largest port in the 19th century when new docks were built. Cardiff became a major coal exporting port after a railway link was built, as did other South Wales ports. The railways were responsible for developing new ports such as Newhaven as ferry terminals and the Manchester Ship Canal enabled Manchester to become a significant port though far inland.

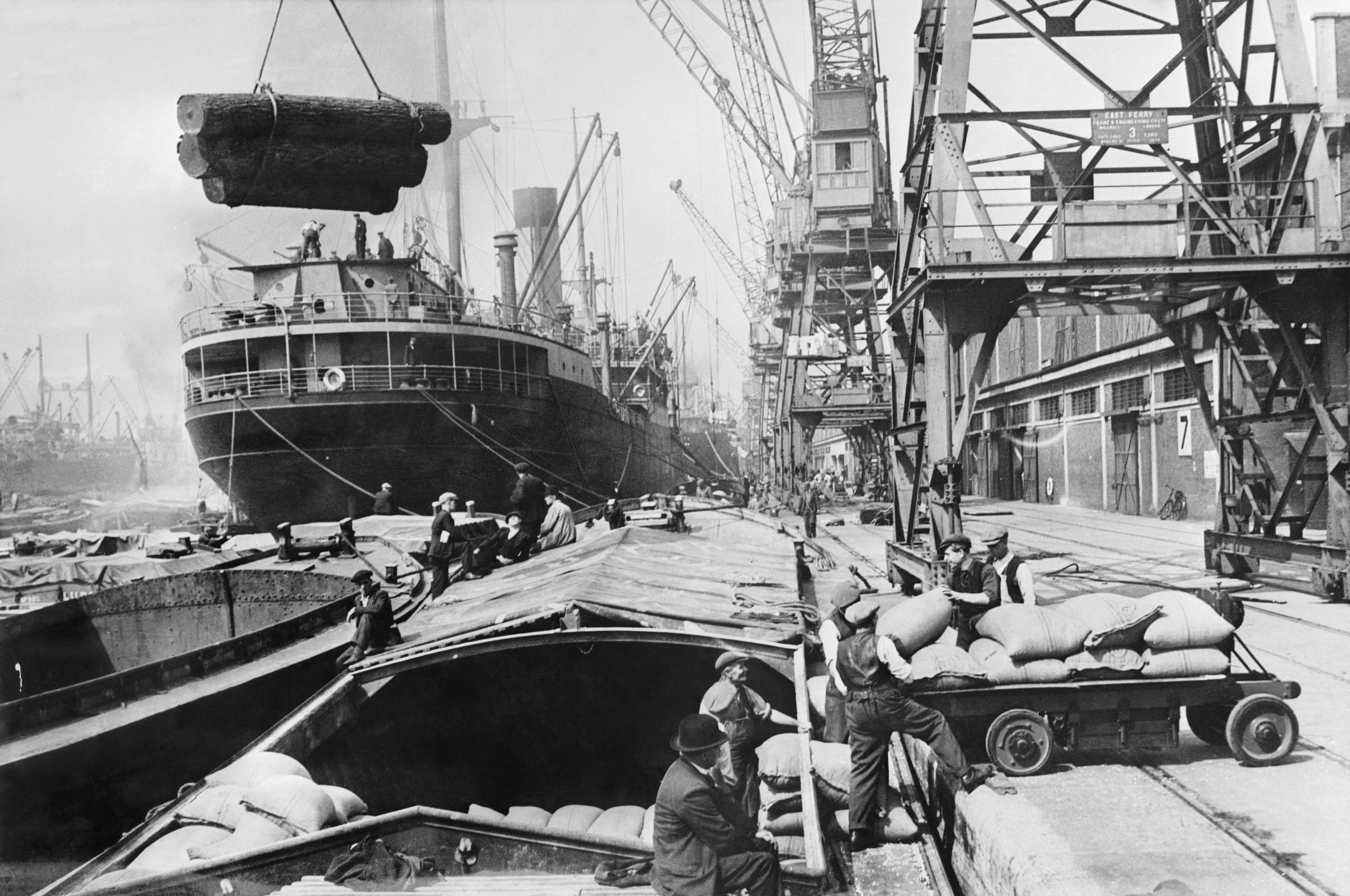
Scene in a British dockyard during WWII

When oil replaced coal after the First World War, coal ports like Cardiff declined. London, Southampton, Manchester, Liverpool, and Glasgow increased in trade during the inter-war years, and ferry ports such as Harwich and Dover grew. Oil terminals were built from the 1920s and the larger ships required new docks at existing ports. After the Second World War new cargo handling methods were introduced, such as pallets (1950), containerisation (1960s) and roll-on/roll-off ships. Dockers at some ports resisted this change so leading to the development of new facilities at ports such as Felixstowe and Tilbury.

Older port facilities became redundant and were redeveloped, such as Canary Wharf in London. In 1977 the major ports of Britain were London, Tees and Hartlepool, Grimsby and Immingham, Forth, and Milford Haven. Many of the small ports were redeveloped as marinas, such as Watchet.

== Trade ==
=== Goods ===
The Navigation Ordinance of 1651 cut out Dutch shippers from English trade, which led to war. In the 17th century trade expanded with imports of fish and sugar. Exports were of corn and manufactured goods. The Royal African Company had a monopoly of the African trade until 1712 but there was much privateering. Later a major part of this trade was in the "Triangular trade" which involved taking goods from Britain to West Africa, slaves from Africa to the West Indies and America, then sugar to Britain. The main ports involved were London, Bristol and Liverpool but there were many others, with a total of 11,615 sailings with 3.4 million slaves between 1662 and 1807. William Wilberforce and his supporters got the slave trade abolished in 1808 and subsequently the Royal Navy tried to suppress it.

In 1600 Queen Elizabeth had given the Honourable East India Company the right to trade east of the Cape of Good Hope. By 1804 the company's fleet from India was said to be worth £6M. The Virginia Company failed in 1624. The South Sea Company had been set up to trade in the Pacific but became involved in domestic politics. The Levant Company was set up to trade with Turkey.

The Industrial Revolution caused a large increase in shipping movements. Raw materials were imported and manufactured goods were exported. In addition there was a need for coal. In the 19th century Britain built up the largest merchant fleet in the world. Around half the ocean-going tonnage was under the Red Ensign.

Examinations for masters and mates of large merchant ships were introduced in 1845 for foreign-going ships and in 1854 for coastal ones. Engineers tickets were required after 1862. Logs were required to be kept after 1850.

In the First World War a fifth of Britain's pre-war merchant shipping had been sunk by 1917, including 1349 ships in August of that year. Most deep water ships were sunk by torpedoes while most coastal ones hit mines. The fleets of neutral countries had expanded and in the 1920s there was a slump in shipping. Development of refrigerated ships allowed the importation of lamb and other meats from places such as New Zealand. A large number of merchant ships were sunk in the Second World War, but Britain's fleet had expanded by the end due to new construction. In the 1950s "flags of Convenience" were taking an increasing share of world trade and the Eastern Bloc's shipping was expanding to earn foreign currency.

Excluding tankers and the US War Reserve, Britain still had the world's largest merchant fleet in 1957. However, since then there has been a sharp decline, partly because of "re-flagging" to cut costs. Britain, now the world's fifth largest trading nation, exports 26% of its gross domestic product, with 95% of this trade going by sea.

=== Passenger liners ===
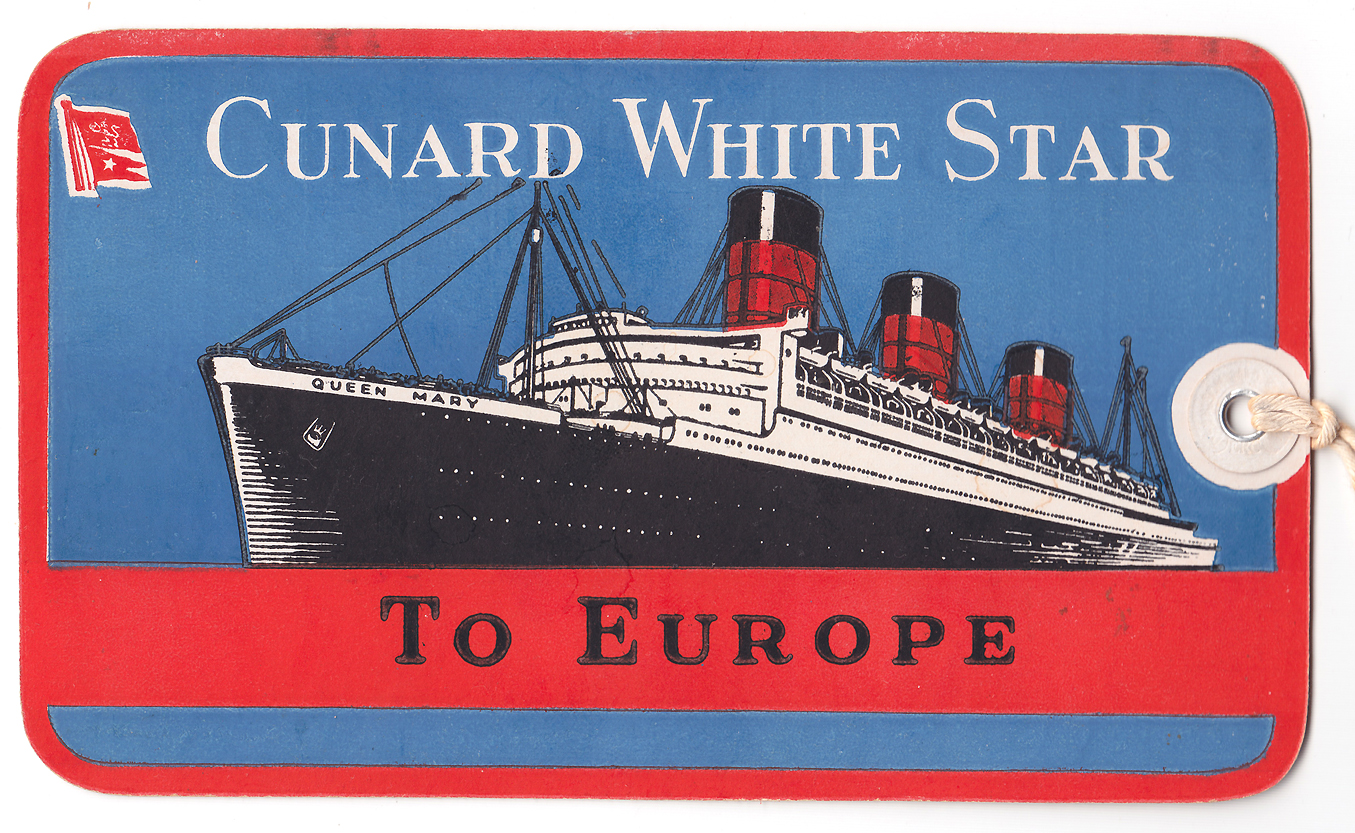
Cunard-White Star RMS Queen Mary baggage tag

The first paddle steamer was used in 1793 and by 1821 there were services between Leith and London. The first British steamer to cross the Atlantic was the Sirius in 1838, closely followed by the Great Western. The Peninsular and Oriental Steam Navigation Company was originally set up to take passengers to Gibraltar and this was extended to India, the company eventually becoming "P&O". The "White Star Line" originally concentrated on the emigrant trade but had fast liners after 1871. During wartime the liners were used as troop ships. Southampton became the main passenger port because of its deep harbour with four tides.

=== Emigration/deportation ===
Some 20,000 people emigrated from Britain to North America in the 20 years after the Mayflower's voyage. After the loss of the American Colonies, Britain used Australia as a penal colony. The First Fleet in 1787 consisted of 1,200 people including 780 convicts. After the Second World War emigrants travelled by sea to the US, Canada, Australia and New Zealand.

== Ferries and cruise boats ==
Ferries operate across the English Channel, the Irish Sea, to the Isle of Man, to the Isle of Wight, the Isles of Scilly and to many Scottish islands. Ships have probably sailed these routes since prehistoric times. However, regular ferry services (apart from Mersey Ferry which started in 1200s) only started in the 18th century. On the Isle of Man route, sailing ships were used until 1830 but steamships proved faster and more reliable. The ferry trade expanded with the advent of roll-on/roll-off ship designs. The ferries across the English Channel were badly affected by the opening of the Channel Tunnel in 1994.

Cruise boats became popular in the 19th century. They operated from beaches in Dorset and Devon, and from Liverpool to North Wales. They also operated in the River Clyde, Thames and Bristol Channel. A paddle steamer, the Waverley built in 1946, is still running, making trips for example to Lundy.

== Customs men and smugglers ==
Customs duties are payable on specified goods imported or exported. The range of goods on which there are charges has varied over time. Customs men were put into the various ports and they tried to keep watch over the adjoining coasts. These boards were combined as the Board of Customs and Excise (later Her Majesty's Customs and Excise, which was formed in 1909, and became part of Her Majesty's Revenue and Customs in 2005.

In the 18th and 19th centuries there was extensive smuggling by sea from the continent to Britain because of the high duty on luxury goods. The later was to finance the wars with France and the United States. Silks, spirits and tobacco came from France while gin came from the Netherlands. Revenue cutters were used to try and intercept the smugglers but with little success. After the Napoleonic Wars there was surplus manpower that was used to try and suppress smuggling. In certain areas (such as in Kent and Cornwall) smuggling was for many communities more economically significant than legal activities such as farming or fishing.

== Fishing ==
In the 19th and early 20th centuries herring fishing was a major activity in Britain. Herring fishing stopped in England and Wales during the 1960s but continued in Scotland until 1977/8. In 1937 the herring catch at Yarmouth dropped dramatically, then that at Lowestoft declined.

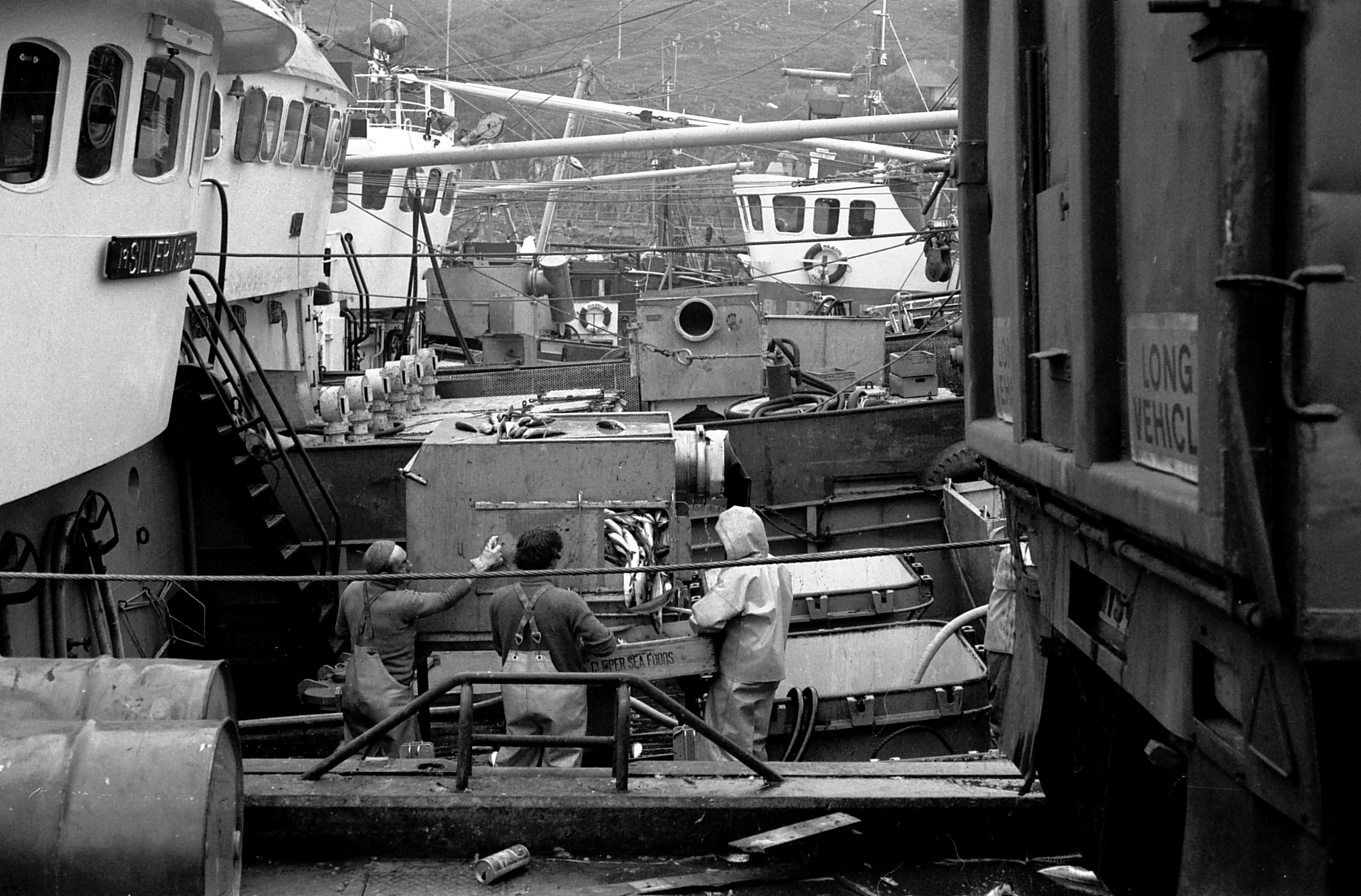
Unloading fish on the fishing boat "Silvery Sea" in Mallaig harbour, Scotland, in 1977. This boat sank with all hands lost after a collision off the Danish coast in 1998.

Trawling has also been a major activity, with the use of radio navigation aids and echo sounders making life easier now. Fishing in waters off Iceland became important, which led to three "Cod Wars" from the 1950s to the 1970s. British boats were excluded from Icelandic waters in 1976. In 1977 a 200-mile (320 km) fishing limit was set up by the European Economic Community, and British waters were opened to other Community members. This led to overfishing. Landings decreased 28% between 1967 and 1997, with fishing now mainly off Scotland.

Other sorts of fishing also take place on a commercial basis such as for crab, lobster, shellfish and mackerel. Sport fishing is popular from coasts and boats, including for shark off south west England.

In the past local conditions led to the development of a wide range of types of fishing boats. The bawley and the smack were used in the Thames Estuary and off East Anglia, while trawlers and drifters were used on the east coast. In 1870 paddle tugs were being used to tow luggers and smacks to sea. Steam trawlers were introduced in 1881, mainly at Grimsby and Hull. The steam drifter was not used in the herring fishery until 1897. In 1890 it was estimated that there were 20,000 men on the North Sea. The first trawlers fished over the side but in 1961 the first stern trawler was used at Lowestoft for fishing in Arctic waters. By 1981 only 27 of 130 deep sea trawlers were still going to sea. Many were converted to oil rig safety vessels. However the "inshore" boats landed a greater weight of fish even in 1973.

Herring fishing started in the Moray Firth in 1819. The peak of the fishing at Aberdeen was in 1937 with 277 steam trawlers, though the first diesel drifter was introduced in 1926.

== Energy ==
=== Gas and oil ===
The first British tanker was launched in 1886 and could carry 1,950 tons of oil. By 1961 the typical tanker was around 80,000 tons which grew to over 100,000 tons by 1967 and to over 250,000 tons by 1973. By 1965 BP had 170 tankers.

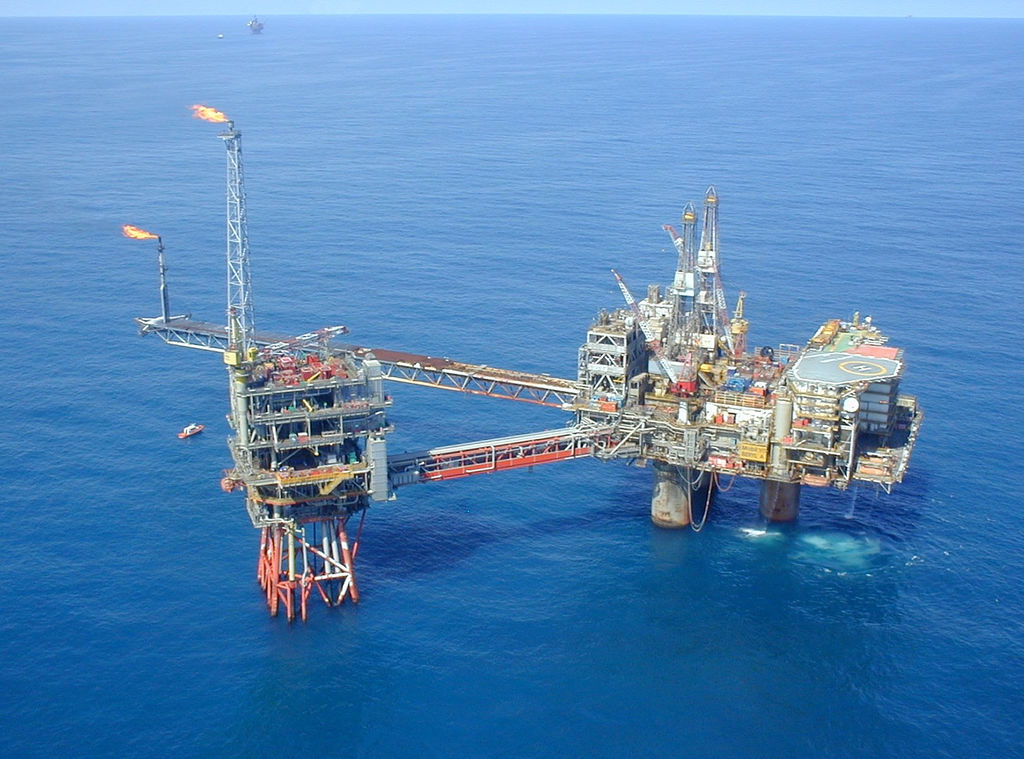
ExxonMobil's Beryl alpha oil platform in the East Shetland Basin

The gas fields in the North Sea have been in production since the 1960s while oil was discovered off Scotland in 1975. This led to the development of several support bases in Scotland. Platform construction has declined since 1985. The imminent decline of North Sea gas has led to the construction of liquid gas tankers and import facilities at Milford Haven.

=== Oil spills ===
There have been a number of major oil spills around the coast of Britain. The wreck of the Torrey Canyon in March 1967 resulted in the first major oil spill. The ship grounded on the Seven Stones reef between Cornwall and the Isles of Scilly. The ship was bombed to break it up and detergent used to disperse the 700 km^{2} oil slick. It is estimated that 15,000 birds were killed and there was also a large effect on marine life. As a result of this incident many lessons were learned on how to handle such problems and it led to changes in regulations. The grounding of MV Braer in January 1993 in Shetland led to the loss of 84,700 tons of light crude oil. There was again a large effect on wildlife, both birds and mammals. Because of the stormy conditions, the oil slick became broken up and had dispersed by October 1994. The Sea Empress hit a rock off Milford Haven in February 1996. Some 730,00 tons of oil were spilt, resulting in an estimated 5,000 birds being killed with much oil being washed up on beaches. It is estimated that the cost of the spill was £60 million.

=== Offshore wind farms ===
Britain started installing wind farms off shore in the year 2000. By February 2007 this had reached 2 GW capacity though its average output was much less. It could provide up to 1.5% of the United Kingdom's electricity. The capacity of offshore wind farms exceeds that of the onshore ones and is expected to rise over the coming years with many proposals being made.

== Coast ==
The coastline of the United Kingdom is constantly changing by erosion and deposition of materials. One area suffering from major erosion is the east coast of England, where in particular the town of Dunwich has been swallowed by the sea. At one time it was one of the largest ports in England but is completely gone. Another place that was largely destroyed is Hallsands, which was hit by storms in 1917, its defences having been removed by offshore dredging. Many beaches have had groynes constructed on them to control the movement of material.

Some areas of the UK are now under threat from rising sea levels while in the past the North Sea, Bristol Channel and English Channel have been flooded. The land is also still recovering from the deposition of ice on northern parts in the last ice age. Thus southern England is sinking while Scotland is rising. In some cases it has been decided to not defend areas against sea encroachments in storms, such as in Porlock bay, while valuable areas are being protected. The Thames Barrier was completed in 1994 to prevent flooding in the upper Thames estuary.

== Leisure activities ==
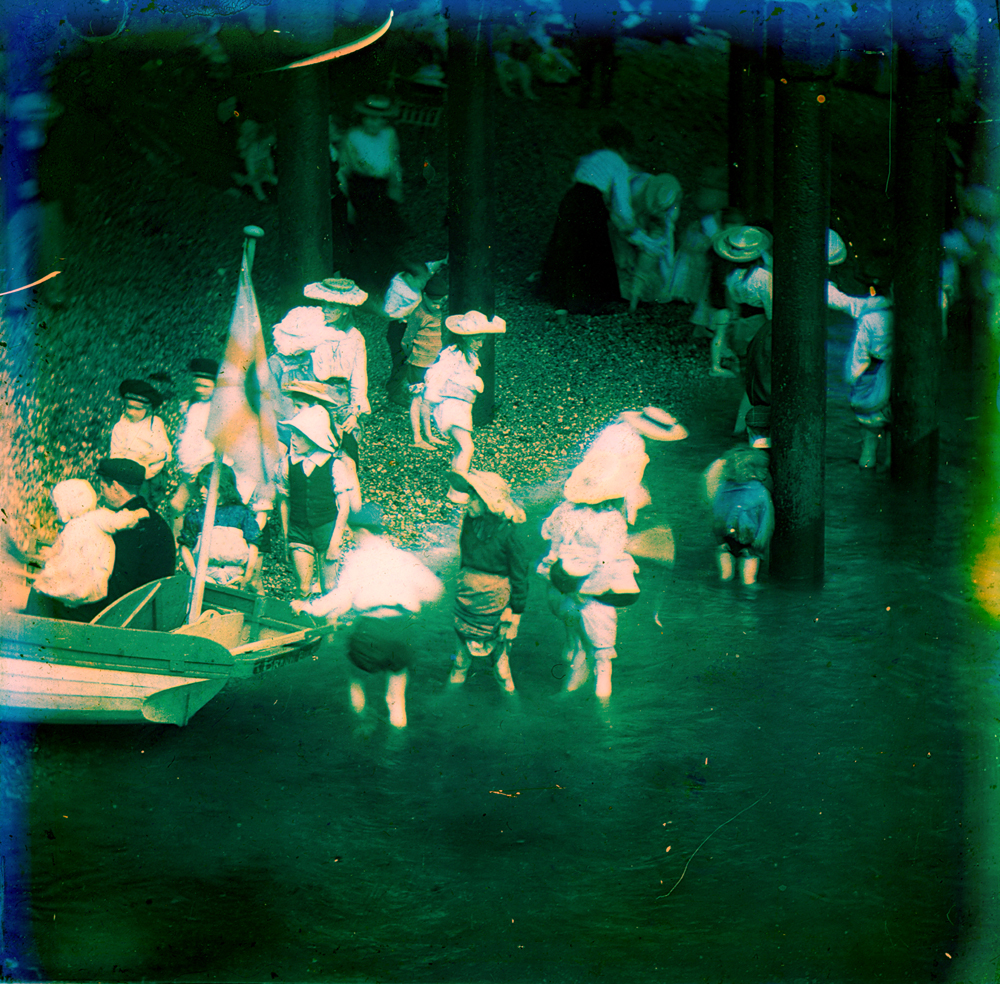
Three-colour lantern slide of children playing on a Brighton beach, 6 August 1906, by Otto Pfenninger

=== Resorts ===
In the 18th century people began visiting places on the coast of Britain for pleasure. Initially this was for medical reasons but became popular when King George III made Weymouth his summer home around 1800 and later King George IV built a palace at Brighton. Many resorts such as Blackpool became popular when they were linked by railways to the big conurbations. More recently there has been a decline in popularity of British resorts due to the advent of cheap package holidays abroad with their better weather.

=== Rowing, yachting and power boats ===
Offshore rowing races are popular in the southwest of England using gigs based on those originally used in the Isles of Scilly for pilotage and attending wrecks as well as smuggling. These are six oared vessels up to about 10 m long with nearly a 2 m beam.

Many yacht club "one designs" were popular between 1920 and 1960, such as the Salcombe yawl which was later built in plastic as the Devon yawl. Later more widespread dinghy designs became more popular, such as the "Enterprise" introduced in 1960. In the late 19th and early part of the 20th century great yachts such as the J-class were built, including "Shamrock V" constructed to attempt to win the America's Cup which originated in 1851. Cowes Week has been held since 1826 and includes a race around the Isle of Wight. The Fastnet race was first sailed in 1925. The first single-handed circumnavigation by a Briton was by John Gusswell between 1955 and 1959, while the first Single-Handed Trans-Atlantic Race was held in 1960 and won by Francis Chichester. The first nonstop circumnavigation race in 1968 was won by Robin Knox-Johnston, while the first "wrong way" circumnavigation was by Chay Blyth in 1970. A Round Britain Single Handed Race was instituted in 1966. A sailing speed world record of 36 knots (67 km/h) was set at Portland by a catamaran in 1980.

Frederick W. Lanchester built the first power boat in 1898 using a 8 horsepower (6.0 kW), water-cooled engine. Since then power boats have been used as run-abouts and for racing, as well as for water-skiing. Both inboard and outboard engines are used. The British Power Boat Company built many power boats between 1927 and 1946 including Miss Britain III and PT9 that became the basis of Motor Torpedo Boats and the US PT boats during the Second World War. The power speed record rose from 95 knots (176 km/h) in 1930 to 123 knots (228 km/h) in 1939. After the war the record speed rose again with runs by Donald Campbell, who was killed during an attempt on the record in 1967.

=== Marinas ===
The increasing popularity of yachting and power boating has led to the creation of many purpose-built marinas and the conversion of existing harbours. See List of marinas#United Kingdom for those in the United Kingdom.

== Marine science ==
=== Hydrographics ===
The United Kingdom Hydrographic Office (first the Admiralty then the Ministry of Defence) is responsible for publishing navigational nautical charts in Britain, now with worldwide cover. It also produces related publications. Originally based in London, it moved to Taunton in the Second World War. The Hydrographic Department of the Admiralty was set up in 1795 and had seven vessels by 1820. One of its chief interests was in finding a Northwest Passage around Canada. The first catalogue of charts was produced in 1825. The hydrographic squadron still forms part of the Royal Navy.

=== Oceanography ===
One of the first scientific articles on oceanography was by James Cook who included information on the oceans in his report on his voyages between 1768 and 1779. James Rennell wrote the first textbooks about currents in the Atlantic Ocean and Indian Ocean around 1800. Sir James Clark Ross took the first sounding in the deep sea in 1840 and Charles Darwin published a paper on reefs and atolls as a result of the second voyage of HMS Beagle (Beagle) in 1831–6. The Royal Society sponsored the Challenger (1858) expedition (1872–76) that resulted in a 50 volume report, covering biological, physical and geological aspects. The 1910 North Atlantic expedition headed by Sir John Murray and Johan Hjort resulted in the classic book The Depths of the Oceans.

The National Oceanographic Laboratory (later the Institute of Oceanographic Sciences) was set up at Godalming but was transferred to the Southampton Oceanographic Centre in 1994. The latter was renamed the National Oceanographic Centre. It operates a number of vessels that undertake exploratory cruises as well as various unmanned vehicles and buoys.

== Maritime studies ==
=== Colleges ===
A number of places in the UK provide facilities for the study of the various aspects of seamanship, such as Orkney College. These courses lead to Certificates of Competency for particular jobs. Other places, such as Liverpool John Moores University, provide more academic courses on mercantile practice, ship design and operation. The University of Exeter is one of those places that has specialised in maritime history.

=== Admiralty law ===
Admiralty law governing relations between entities that operate vessels on the oceans is dealt with by special courts. There was a High Court of Admiralty in London and Vice Admiral's Courts in other ports. Originally they dealt with administrative and naval matters but then included piracy cases (from 1700). By the 16th century they had wide powers but these were later reduced until restored in the 19th century. Trade disputes generally are dealt with by the commercial court. The admiralty laws were a prominent feature in causing the American Revolution.

== Law of the sea ==
This is a body of law governing international relations at sea. There have been three United Nations Conventions on the Law of the Sea - in 1956, 1960 and 1967 - which have been ratified by Britain. The last one came into force in 1994.

=== Ship design ===
Originally ship design, or naval architecture, was by the skill of the shipwright only. In the 16th century shipwrights were authorised by the crown and under Henry VII a list of master shipwrights was produced. A treatise on ship design was written in the 16th century. A school of naval architecture was set up at Portsmouth in 1811. Nowadays ship design can be studied at a number of colleges in Britain. The professional body for ship designers in Britain is the Royal Institution of Naval Architects

== Maritime museums ==
The main maritime museum in Britain is the National Maritime Museum at Greenwich. However, there are nearly 300 smaller ones (including ships) at various ports around Britain. These include museums at Kingston upon Hull, Hartlepool and the oldest Merseyside Maritime Museum at the Royal Albert Dock in Liverpool as well as HMNB Portsmouth. These provide much information on the maritime history of Britain.

=== Maritime archaeology ===
Maritime archaeology is important in Britain because of the large number of shipwrecks around the coast and because of the large areas off the coast that have been submerged by rising sea levels. The archaeology of shipwrecks covers sites from the Bronze Age onward. Many artifacts have been obtained from the southern North Sea, for example. A recent find on the coast was Seahenge. The subject can be studied at universities in Bristol, Bournemouth and Southampton while English Heritage is also interested.

== Maritime subjects in the Arts ==
=== Art ===
Many works of Marine art have been produced by British artists and on British maritime topics. One of the best known paintings in Britain is "The Fighting Temeraire" by J. M. W. Turner that hangs in London's National Gallery. A lot of seaside resorts have art galleries selling marine subjects.

In addition there is art produced by the sailors themselves, such as scrimshaw.

=== Literature ===
Britain has had many authors who wrote on marine topics, the sailing era being a popular period. Joseph Conrad, who was born in Poland in 1857, came to Britain in 1878 and was naturalised in 1886. He undertook a voyage in a collier and then a wool clipper, obtaining a master's ticket in 1887. His last voyage in 1916 was in a Q-ship during the war. Conrad wrote many stories based on his experiences, such as "Lord Jim". Basil Lubbock went out to the Klondike and then sailed back from San Francisco on a grain ship. From this he wrote "Round the Horn before the Mast" describing the life of an ordinary seaman. After settling down in England he collected facts on sailing ships and wrote books about them. Alan Villiers first sailed in a British square rigger and then in Danish ones. He bought a small Danish fully rigged ship and sailed around the world. After his return he wrote books about square riggers. Many works of fiction have also been written, perhaps the most famous being the series on Horatio Hornblower by C. S. Forester.

=== Music ===
There are a large number of sea shanties that have been collected, many by Cecil Sharp at Watchet.

== See also ==
- Maritime history
- Maritime history of England
- Maritime history of Scotland
- Maritime history of Europe
- Maritime history of the Channel Islands
- Container ship
- History of the United Kingdom
- Wind power in the United Kingdom
- Naval history
- Naval historian
- Royal Navy officer rank insignia
- Whaling in the United Kingdom
