= Maritime history of England =

The maritime history of England involves events including shipping, ports, navigation, and seamen, as well as marine sciences, exploration, trade, and maritime themes in the arts of England. Until the advent of air transport and the creation of the Channel Tunnel, marine transport was the only way of reaching the rest of Europe from England and for this reason, maritime trade and naval power have always had great importance. Prior to the Acts of Union in 1707, the maritime history of the British Isles was largely dominated by England.

== Chronology ==
=== Ancient times ===
Paleolithic and mesolithic hunter-gatherers may well have reached Great Britain by sea, at least partly. Separation of the island from Ireland was about 9000 BC while separation from the continent of Europe occurred around 6500 BC. English maritime history really starts with the Massaliote Periplus used by Phoenician traders in Iron Age Europe. This includes a description of the trade route to England around 600 BC. It is believed that this trade was in tin and other raw materials. A later periplus was that of Pytheas of Marsallia in "On the Ocean", written about 325 BC. It is clear that in the Iron Age trade between Gaul and Britain was routine and that fishermen travelled to Orkney, Shetland and Norway.

The first vessels used by Britons are presumed to have been rafts and dugout canoes, though the coracle, a small single passenger boat is known to have been used at least since the Roman invasion. Coracles are round or oval in shape, made of a wooden basket-like frame with a hide stretched over it then tarred to provide waterproofing. Being light, it can be carried over a shoulder. Coracles are capable of operating in mere inches of water due to the keel-less hull. The early peoples are believed to have used these boats for fishing and travel.

Early Britons used hollowed tree trunks as canoes. Examples of these canoes have been found buried in marshes and mud banks of river, at lengths upwards of two metres. One of these was found at Shapwick, Somerset in 1906. It was formed from an oak log and was six metres long. It was probably used to transport people, animals and goods across the Somerset Levels in the Iron Age.

In 1992 a notable archaeological find, named the "Dover Bronze Age Boat", was unearthed from beneath what is modern day Dover, England. It is about 9.5 metres long by 2.3 metres wide and was determined to have been a seagoing vessel. Radiocarbon dating revealed that the craft dates from approximately 1600 BC and is the oldest known ocean-going boat. The hull was of half oak logs and side panels also of oak that were stitched on with yew withies. Both the straight grained oak and yew bindings are now extinct in England. A reconstruction in 1996 proved that a crew of between four and sixteen paddlers could have easily propelled the boat during Force 4 winds at upwards of four knots to a maximum of 5 knots (9.3 km/h). The boat could have easily carried a significant amount of cargo and with a strong crew may have been able to traverse up to thirty nautical miles in a day.

Remains from a Bronze Age trading vessel have been found off Salcombe, Devon. The finds include palstave axe heads, an adze, a cauldron handle and a gold bracelet. There are also blades of swords and rapiers which are amongst the earliest in the country. Some of the objects originated in north France and are types that are rare in Britain. Evidence of tin trading has been found at Mount Batten and Bantham in Devon.

=== The Roman Period ===
Although Julius Caesar made brief exploratory sea-borne expeditions to Britain in 55 and 54 BC, these were nearly a disaster because many of the boats were wrecked. The invasion fleet under the emperor Claudius in AD 43 was a large one, with 40000 men, and landed at Richborough, Kent.

Later, part of the Classis Britannica was based in Britain, the job of which was to control the English Channel and North Sea. At this time Britannia suffered raids by Scoti (from Ireland) and Saxons, as well as attacks by Picts from what is now northern Scotland. There was a Roman officer in charge of the "Saxon Shore" and a series of forts (or perhaps trading posts) was set up along the south and east coast. There also seems to have been a Roman fleet in the Bristol Channel, based on archaeological evidence.

Roman trade with Britain was in grain and olive oil from North Africa, with slaves and lead being exported, while men for the army and administration also came. Later, grain was exported to the continent for the army. There was also trade with Ireland.

=== Early Middle Ages ===
After the end of Roman control of Britain in the early 5th century, "Saxon" mercenaries were recruited by British kings. The first are described by Gildas as arriving in "three keels" and were soon followed by more. After a dispute over pay, the Saxons revolted and were able to establish Saxon controlled areas in the east and south of England. This apparently involved both Angles and Jutes as well as Saxons. This led to much trade across the North Sea from the east coast of Britain. When an important person died their body would be placed inside a ship burial, as at Sutton Hoo where the traces of a boat 27 m long by 4.5 m wide and 1.5 m deep were found, dating to about 625 AD.

In the western areas of Britain trade with the Mediterranean world continued, many pots and other goods from Byzantium having been found at sites such as Tintagel. There was migration from southern England to Brittany and northern Spain.

By the 730s a toll was placed on ships using the port of London, which was re-founded by King Alfred after its recapture from the Vikings in 886 AD. Wine, timber and food was imported while salt, cloth, hide, lead and slaves were exported.

From the 9th century, Vikings raided Britain but were also traders. King Alfred raised a navy to counter this and the first sea battle against them is thought to have been fought in 875 AD. The Viking longship was clinker built, utilising overlapping wooden strakes and curved stemposts. It was propelled by both oars and sail. There was a steering oar at the back on the right-hand side. The knarr was a cargo vessel that differed from the longship in that it was larger and relied solely on its square rigged sail for propulsion.

=== Later Middle Ages ===
In the spring of 1066 northern Britain was attacked by King Harald of Norway and Tostig Godwinson in 300-500 ships. The Norman conquest of England, in the autumn of 1066, which occurred after a seaborne invasion at Hastings, was unopposed as the English fleet had returned to base. After this the kings of England were also rulers of much of France so presumably there was much trade across the English Channel. Various wars were fought against the French requiring transport of armies and their support. In 1120 the "White Ship" was wrecked and the sons of Henry I drowned, while in 1147 a fleet of 167 ships sailed from Dartmouth on a crusade to capture Lisbon from the Moors. Henry II invaded Ireland in 1171 and another crusade fleet sailed in 1190.

The Cinque Ports were a group of harbours, originally five, that were given privileges in exchange for providing ships to the kings of England when required.

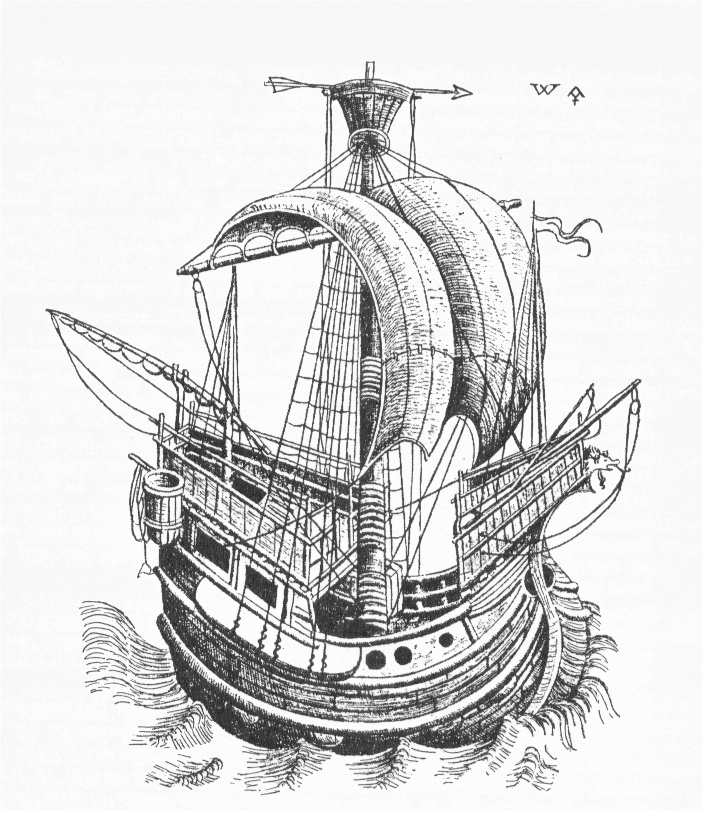
An example of a cog.

The cog was a boat design which is believed to have evolved from (or at least have been influenced by) the longship and was in wide use by the 12th century. It too used the clinker method of construction. Ships began to be built with straight stem posts and the rudder was fixed to the stern post which made a boat easier to steer. To make ships faster, more masts and sails were fitted.

The Hanseatic League was an alliance of trading guilds that established and maintained a trade monopoly over the Baltic Sea and to a certain extent the North Sea in the Late Middle Ages, starting in the 13th century. Protection for the league was given in England in 1157. Warehouses belonging to the league were set up in eight English ports and one Scottish port. By the 16th century the league imploded and there was a rise of Dutch and English merchants.

In the 14th and 15th centuries, seamen's guilds were formed in Bristol, King's Lynn, Grimsby, Hull, York and Newcastle.

=== Age of Exploration ===
From the early 15th century, continuing into the 17th century, English ships travelled around the world searching for new trading partners and establishing new trading routes. In the process new peoples were encountered and lands were mapped that were previously unknown to the English. Bristol ships were venturing into the Atlantic Ocean in 1480/1 and may have reached Newfoundland.

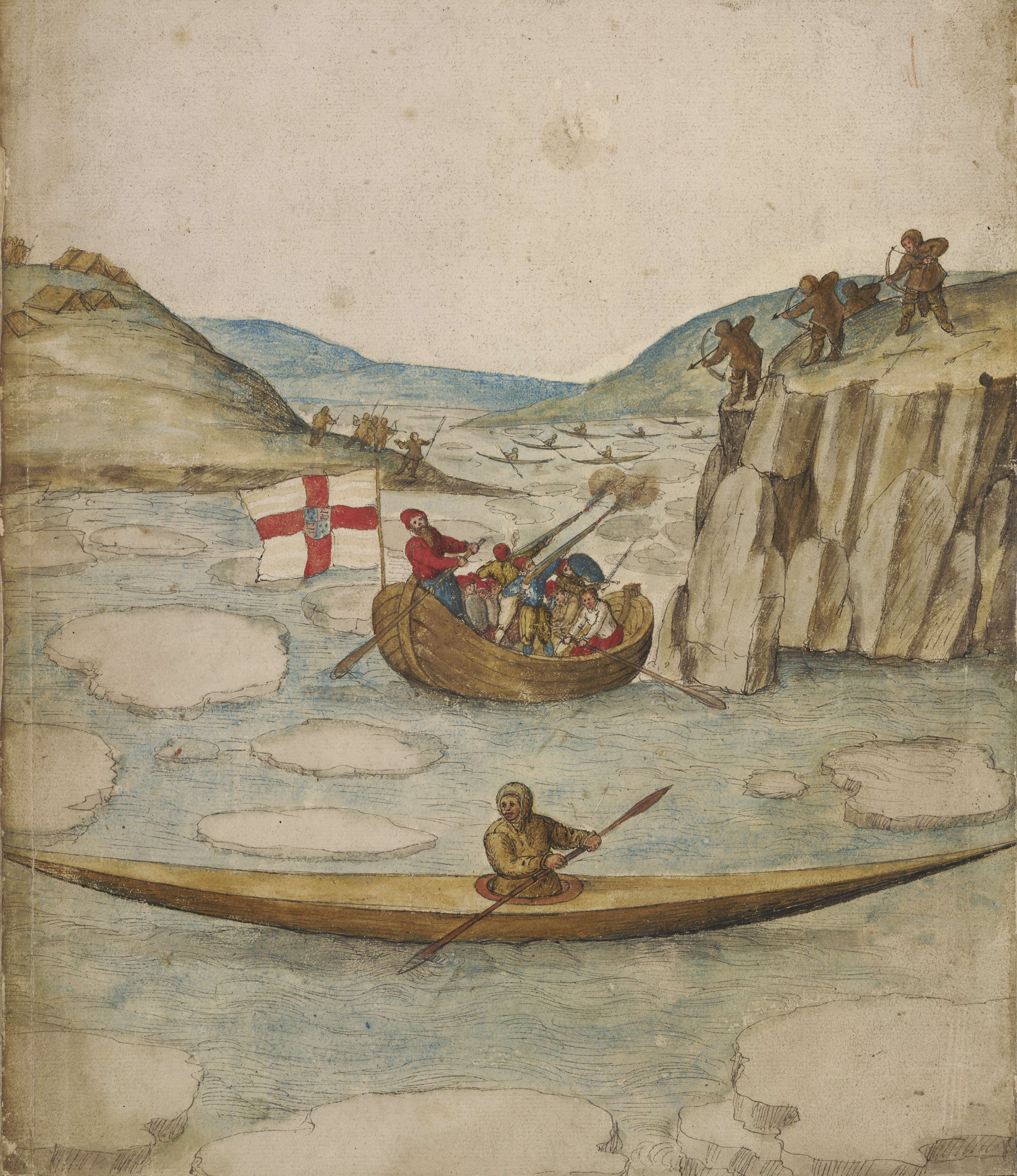
Skirmish between Martin Frobisher's men and Inuit, c. 1577–78.

Before Christopher Columbus reached mainland America, John Cabot was employed by the English government to discover new lands. He first sailed from Bristol in the "Matthew" in 1497. It is not clear where the small fleet went but two likely locations are Nova Scotia or Newfoundland. They did not find the passage to China for which they were looking. A second voyage was made in 1498 but 4 of the 5 ships vanished. Some scholars maintain that the name "America" comes from Richard Amerike, a Bristol merchant and customs officer, who is claimed (on very slender evidence) to have helped finance the Cabots' voyages.

An attempt was made to find a north-east passage to China in 1553 which was unsuccessful but led to the formation of the Muscovy Company. The Baltic was explored in the 1570s and led to the setting up of English bases in Hanse ports.

In 1578, Sir Francis Drake, in the course of his circumnavigation of the world, discovered Cape Horn at the tip of South America. The sea between this and Antarctica is now known as Drake Passage.

Richard Hakluyt was an English writer who is remembered for his efforts in promoting and supporting the settlement of North America by the English through his works, notably Divers Voyages Touching the Discoverie of America (1582) and The Principal Navigations, Voiages, Traffiques and Discoveries of the English Nation (1598–1600). The latter also included accounts of voyages to Russia.

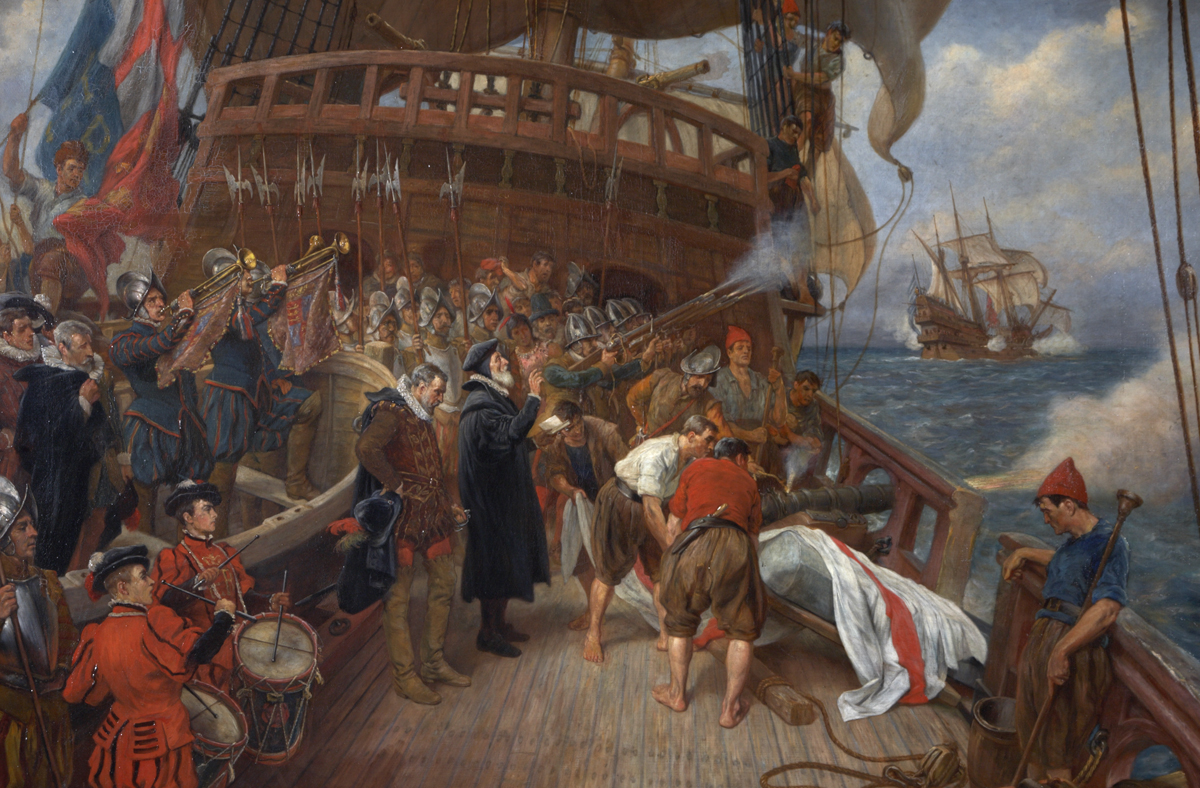
Burial of Francis Drake off Panama in 1596, painting by Thomas Davidson

Sir Humphrey Gilbert established a colony in Newfoundland in 1583. The first (unsuccessful) British colony in America was set up by Sir Walter Raleigh at Roanoke, "Virginia" (now North Carolina) in 1585. Only one of the 22 ships sailing to Roanoke was lost. An exploratory voyage had been made the year before. When a re-supply voyage was made the colonists had vanished.

As a result of this exploration joint stock companies were set up, such as the Muscovy (Russia) Company, the Honourable East India Company (1599), the Levant Company and the Hudson's Bay Company. Trading "factories" were set up in India by the British in several ports. Similar companies were set up by the Dutch and Portuguese, which led to rivalries.

The first modern underwater boat proposal was made by the Englishman William Bourne who designed a prototype submarine in 1578. Unfortunately for him these ideas never got past the planning stage.

=== Seventeenth century ===
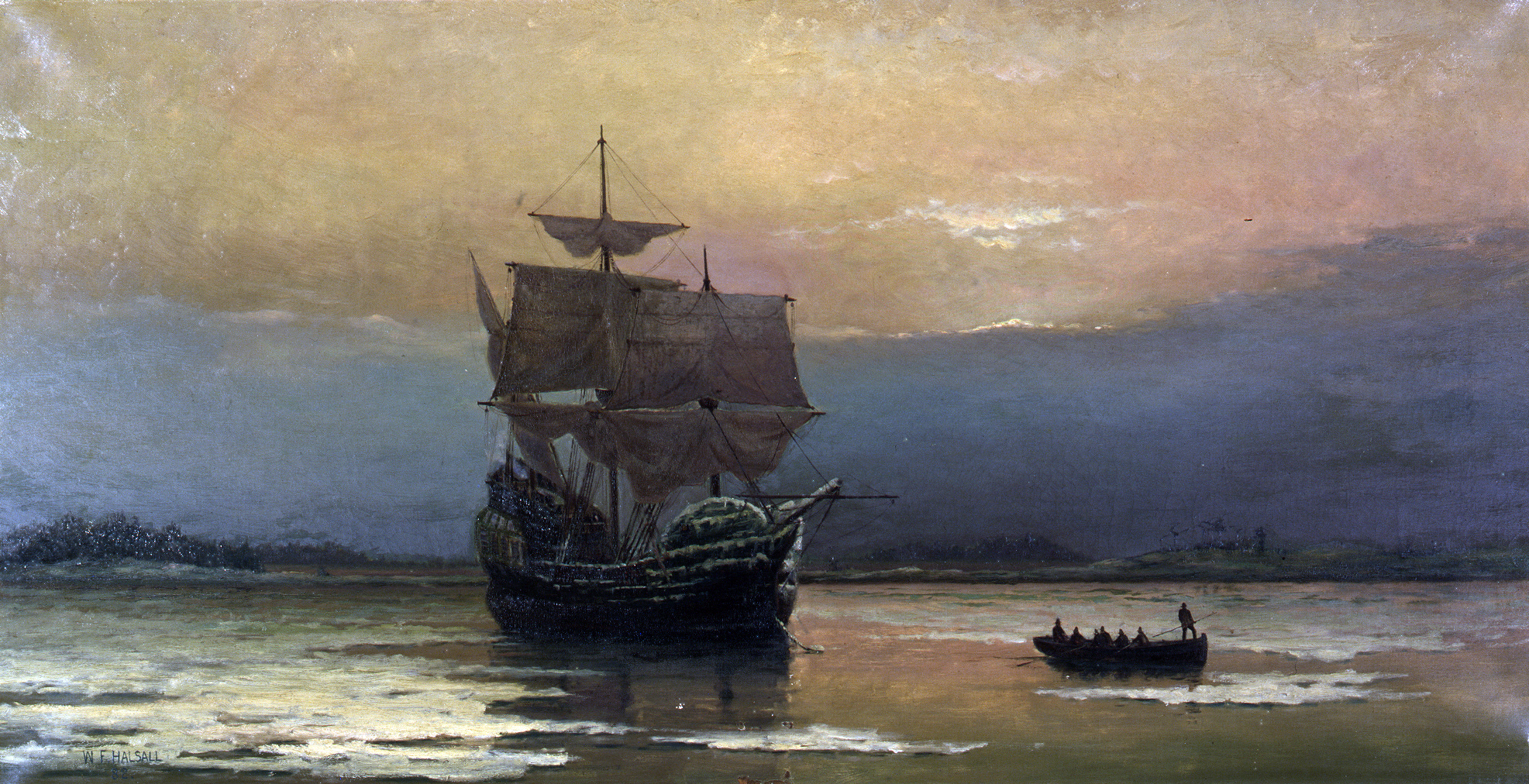
The Mayflower in the New World.

The first successful British colony in America was set up in 1607 at Jamestown. It languished until a new wave of colonists arrived in the late 17th century and set up commercial agriculture based on tobacco. The Mayflower sailed from Plymouth in 1620. The connection between the American colonies and Britain, with shipping as its cornerstone, would continue to grow unhindered for almost two hundred years.

Several major internal political events hinged on the participation (or lack of participation) of the Navy. First, at the end of the years of the Protectorate, the English Royal Navy brought Charles II back from his exile in Holland in May 1660, aboard the hastily renamed HMS Royal Charles (1660). Again in 1688, the monarchy changed leadership as Roman Catholic James II fled the country; the English fleet made no effort oppose the landing of the Protestant William of Orange.

During the 17th century ship experienced significant change. During the early part of the 17th century, English shipbuilders developed sturdy, well masted and defensible ships, that because of the way they were rigged, required a significant crew to man. Though this allowed English ships to travel great distances and survive in hostile waters, they could not remain competitive in the merchant shipping industry, which required ships that had greater stowage but smaller crews. The Dutch had long been building such ships called fluits, which originated towards the end of the 16th century in the Netherlands. These vessels carried little more than half the crew of English merchant ships of comparable stowage because of their longer keel, which allowed for a much larger hold, and fewer sails, which required fewer men to maintain. When the English engaged in several wars with the Dutch and their European allies during the later half of the century, they were exceptionally good at capturing Dutch merchant ships. These ships were soon bought into the English merchant fleet and gradually, out of the popular demand of merchants, English shipbuilders adapted some of the techniques used by Dutch builders to create ships which required smaller crews and had larger stowage.

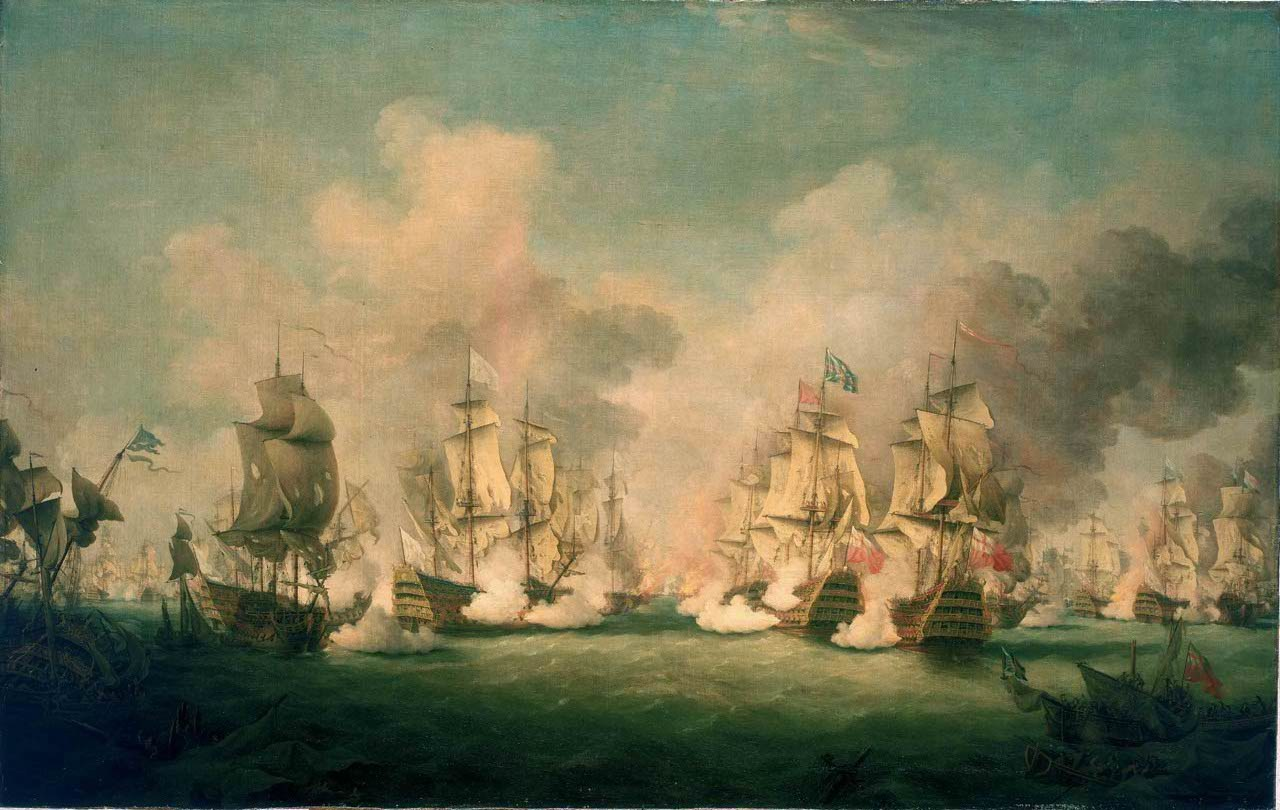
The Battle of Barfleur in 1692

The 17th century was a period of growth in maritime shipping. English ships were being used as a strategic transportation method, especially for Armenian merchants, to link the Persian Gulf trading centers to the Levant. Even though Armenians had their own ships, they were mainly using English fleet services. Though growth was slow in the first several decades, trade with the Mediterranean, East Indies, and North America Colonies and the participation in the Newfoundland Fishing Industry, witnessed growth throughout the teens, 20s and 30s. Though the Civil War caused some decrease in trade, growth was generally good until the resurgence of the Dutch traders due to a return to peace in their country in 1648, causing a decrease in English trade, especially to the Baltic. Parliament enacted the Navigation Ordinance of 1651 to control the access the Dutch had to English ports, in an attempt to abate the control the Dutch had over trade. After the restoration, the fishing industry, which now was focusing more on the Iceland fishery than Newfoundland which had been taken over by North American fishermen, reached its apex of expansion, however foreign trade continued to significantly expand.

The first modern submersible was built by Cornelius Drebbel, a Dutchman in the service of James I of England in 1620. Its exact design is not known but improved versions were tested in the River Thames between 1620 and 1624.

== Royal Navy ==
=== Early Navy ===
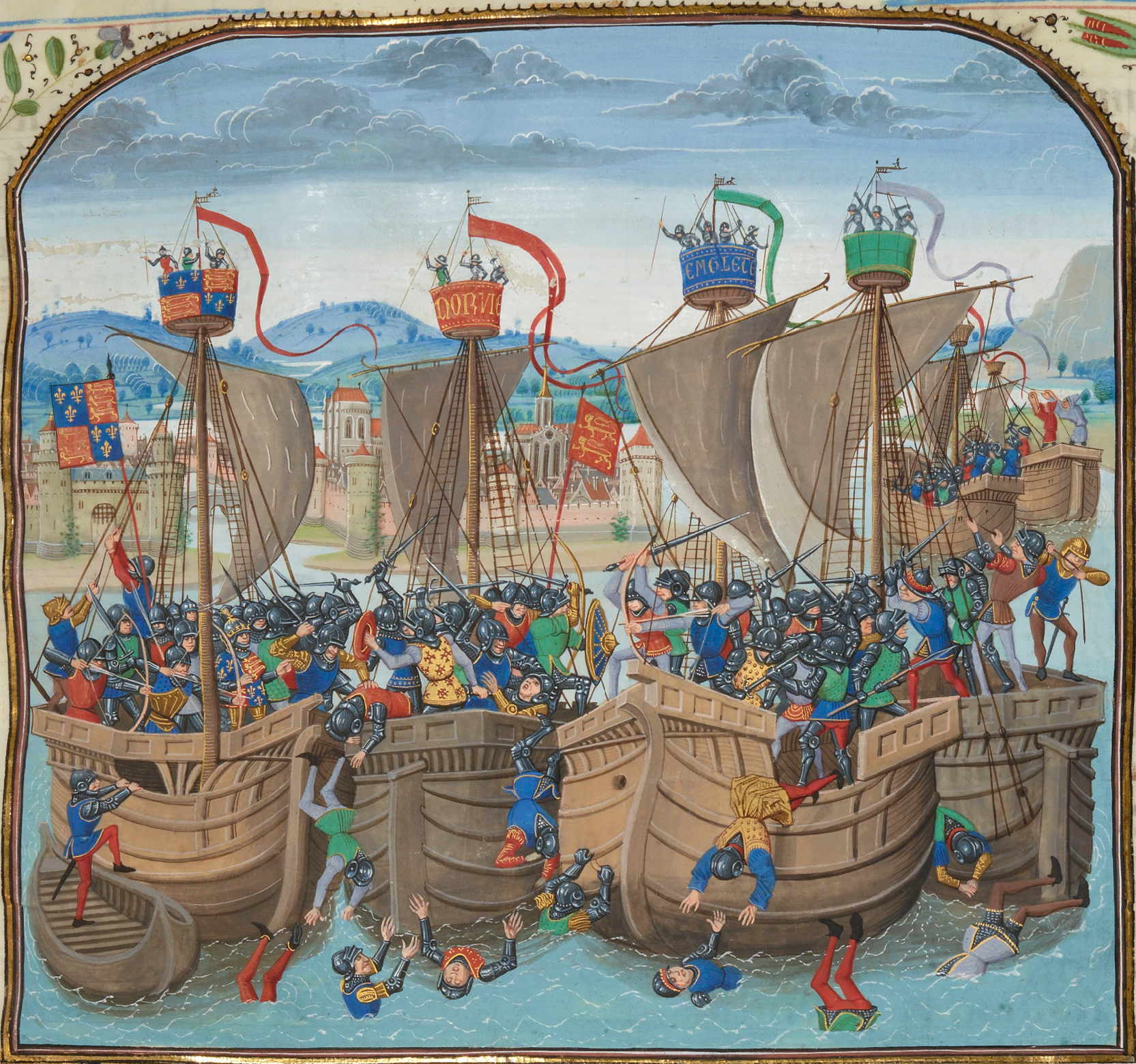
The Battle of Sluys as depicted in Froissart's Chronicles; late 14th century

England's first known navy was established by Alfred the Great which, despite inflicting a significant defeat on the Vikings in the Wantsum Channel, Kent, fell into disuse. It was revived by Athelstan and had 400 ships in 937. When the Norman invasion was imminent, King Harold had trusted his navy to prevent William the Conqueror's fleet from crossing the Channel. However, not long before the invasion, the fleet was damaged in a storm, driven into harbour and the Normans were able to cross unopposed.

The Norman kings created a naval force in 1155, or adapted a force that already existed, with ships provided by the Cinque Ports. The English Navy began to develop during the 12th and 13th centuries, King John having a fleet of 500 sails. In the mid 14th century Edward III's navy had 712 ships. There then followed a period of decline.

=== The Tudor navy ===
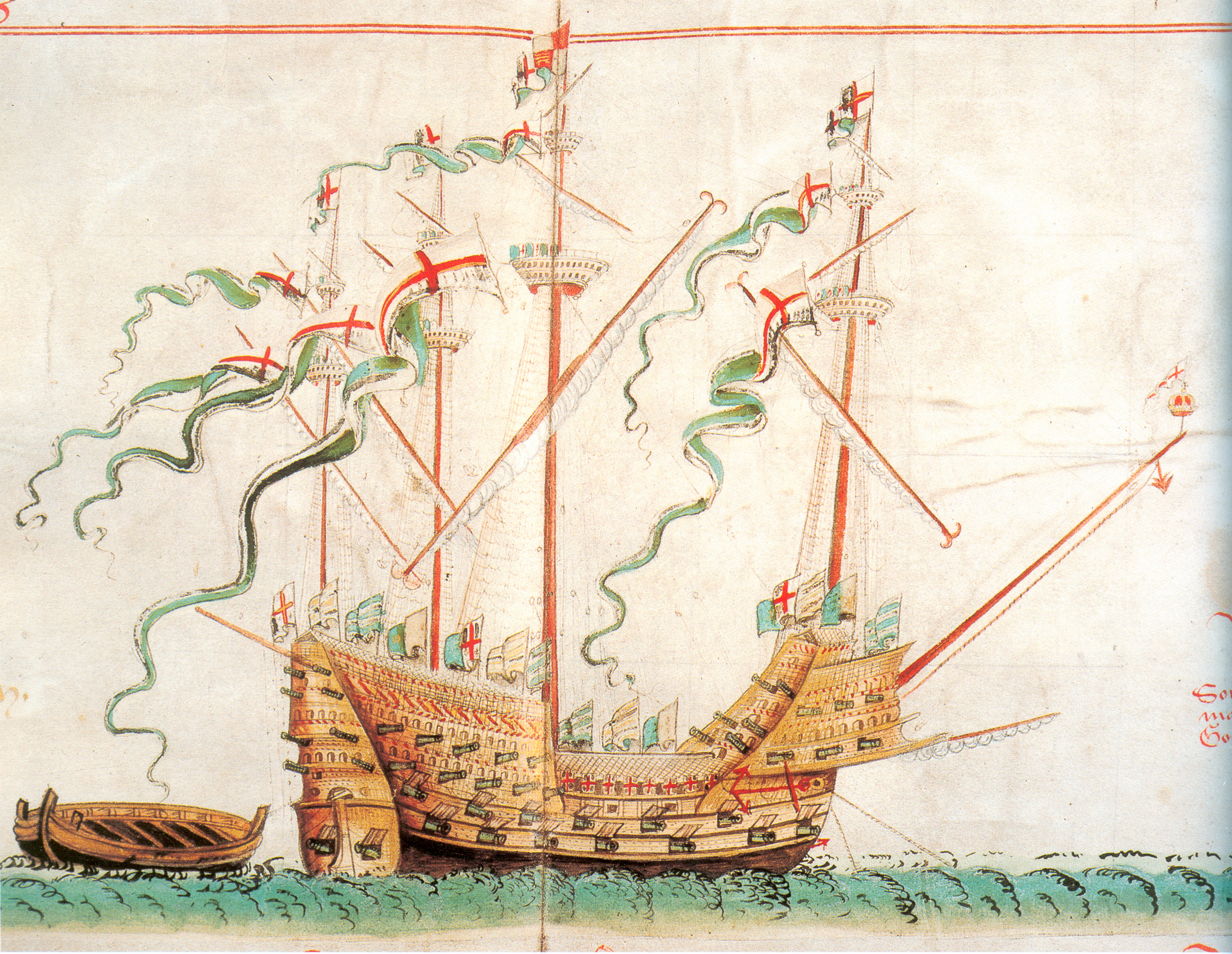
The Henri Grace à Dieu

Until the time of Henry VII, the kings of England commandeered and armed merchant ships when there was a need for a navy. Henry started a programme of building specialised warships. By the end of his reign there were five royal ships, two being four-masted carracks that were much larger than the usual English merchant ship. By the time that Henry VIII died in 1547 the navy had been built up to about 40 ships. The invention of gunport meant that guns could be carried much lower in a ship and so more and heavier ones could be carried. In addition a warship carried archers who tried to kill the enemy crew. However the king still needed to borrow some ships to fight sea battles. Henry VIII started new shipbuilding yards at Deptford and Woolwich Dockyard. He had two major ships: the Henri Grâce à Dieu and the Mary Rose, which later sank.

=== The Stuart/Commonwealth navy ===
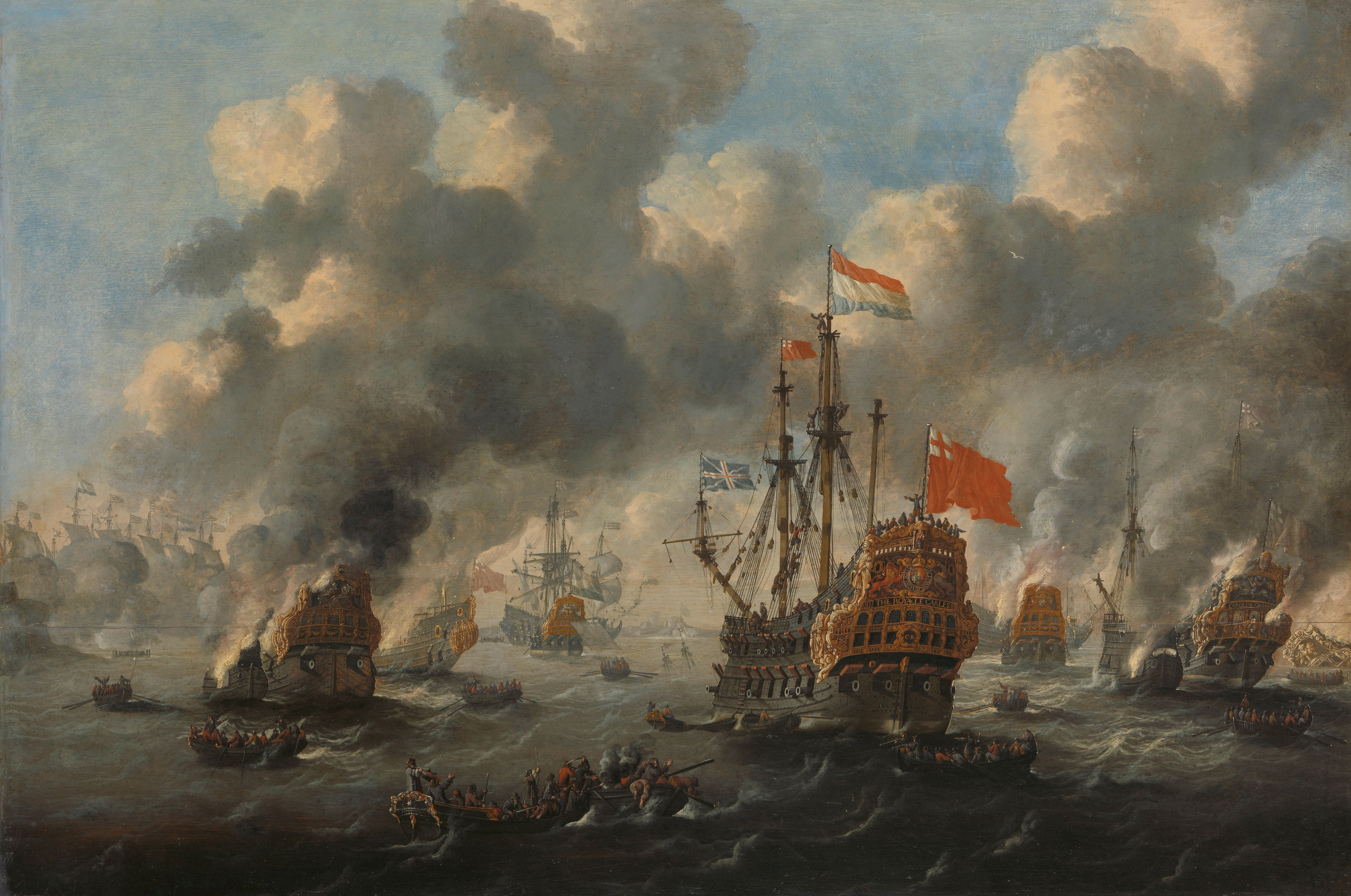
The Dutch Raid on the Medway in 1667 during the Second Anglo–Dutch War

Neither James I or Charles I was willing to spend money on the navy. It became too weak to defend the coast from Barbary pirates.

During the Commonwealth of England, Oliver Cromwell improved the navy. Admiral Robert Blake led the English fleet to victory in the First Anglo–Dutch War. After the restoration of the monarchy, Charles II continued to reform the navy. The king's brother, later James II, was for many years the Lord High Admiral. Samuel Pepys became Clerk of the Acts to the King's Ships and reformed the supply service to the Navy. He also instigated examinations for commanders, pursers, surgeons and parsons.

=== The Admiralty ===
In the late 13th century the Northern and Western Fleets were commanded by admirals and the post of "Lord Admiral of England" was created in 1408 but the Admiralty was set up in March 1545 as the King's Council of the Marine. It was responsible for Navy operations and the ship's officers. The First Lord of the Admiralty is a civilian and a member of the Government.

The first Fighting Instructions were issued in 1653 and Sailing Instructions in 1673.

=== Notable wars ===
==== Hundred Years War ====
During the Hundred Years' War (1337–1453) the French fleet was initially stronger than that of the English, but the former was almost completely destroyed at the Battle of Sluys in 1340. Many other sea battles were fought in this period.

==== The Armada ====
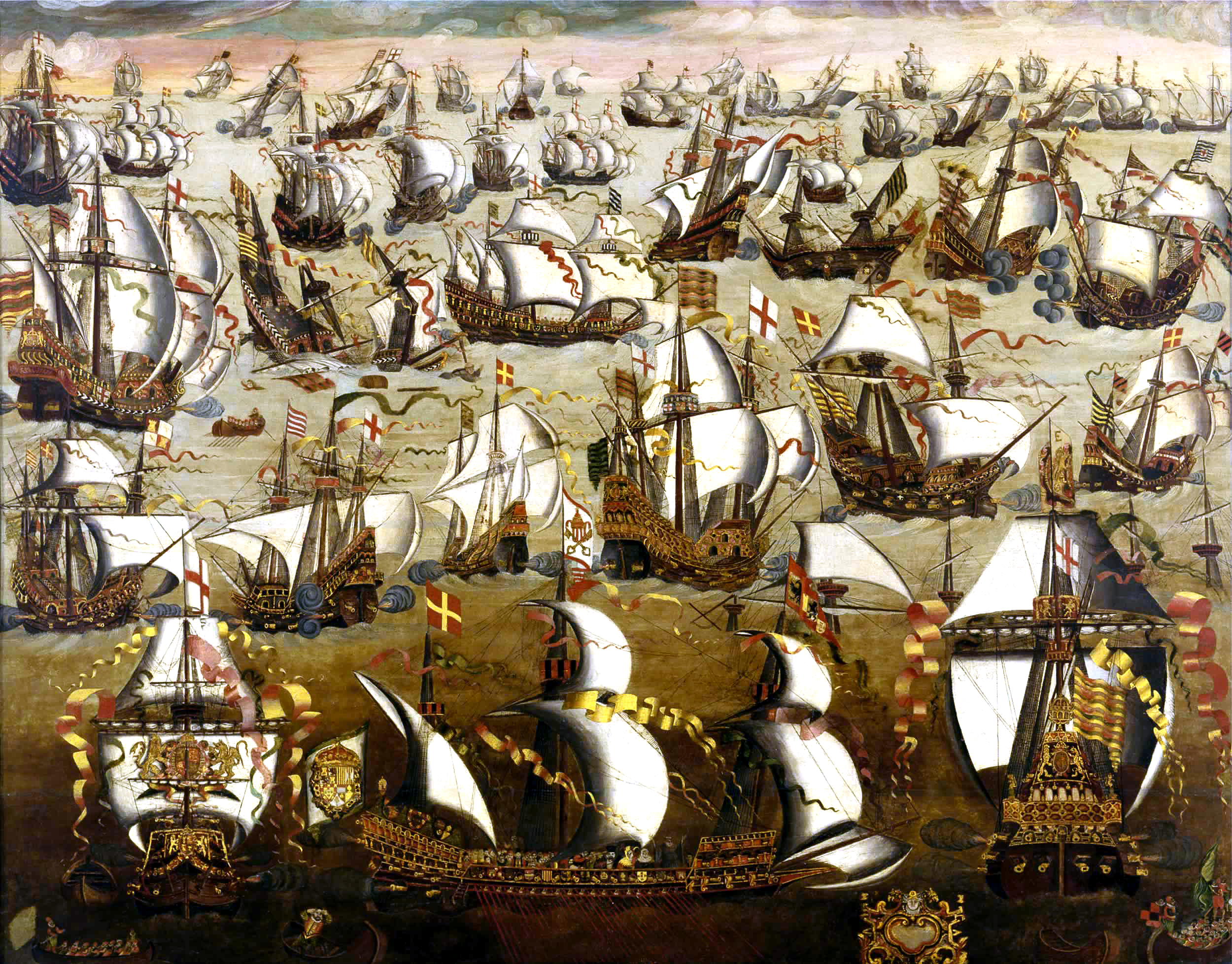
A late 16th-century painting of the Spanish Armada in battle with English warships

The Spanish Armada was the Spanish fleet that sailed against England under the command of Alonso de Guzmán El Bueno, 7th Duke of Medina Sidonia in 1588. It was sent by King Philip II of Spain to take the Duke of Parma's army from the Spanish Netherlands to a landing in southeast England. The Armada consisted of about 130 warships and converted merchant ships. After forcing its way up the English Channel, being attacked by the English fleet of about 200 vessels, it anchored off the coast at Gravelines waiting for the army. A fire ship attack drove the Spanish ships from their safe anchorage. The Armada was blown north up the east coast of England and attempted to return to Spain by sailing around Scotland but many ships were wrecked off Ireland. The Spanish sent a smaller fleet, about 100 ships, the following year but this ran into stormy weather off Cornwall and was blown back to Spain.

The English sent a fleet of warships to Spain in 1589 led by Sir Francis Drake. This caused a further weakening of the Spanish fleet but failed to strike a decisive blow. A further raid was made in 1596. The Anglo-Spanish war was concluded by the Treaty of London in 1604. The peace enabled the British to consolidate their hold on Ireland and make a concerted effort to establish colonies in North America.

==== Anglo-Dutch Wars ====
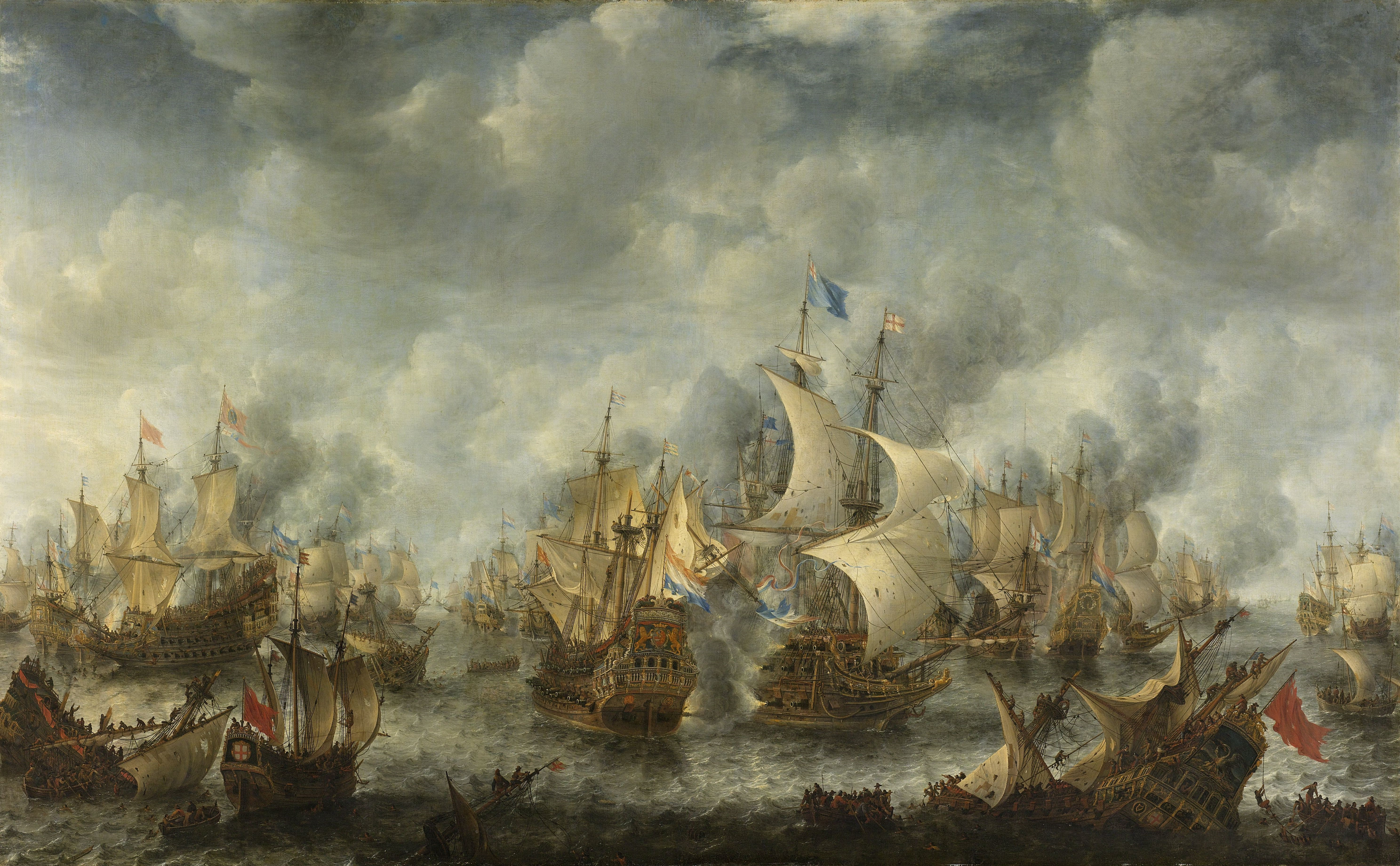
The Battle of Scheveningen in 1653

The First Anglo–Dutch War was fought between 1652 and 1653. Battles were fought at Dungeness, Portland, the Gabbard and Scheveningen. In the last of these the Dutch commander Maarten Tromp was killed but his acting flag captain kept up fleet morale by not lowering Tromp's standard. In the Second Anglo-Dutch War (1665–7) Cornelis Tromp prevented a total catastrophe for the Dutch by taking over fleet command to allow the escape of the greater part of the fleet. The war proved to be a victory for the Dutch, after which the Dutch Navy became the world's strongest, continuing domination over world trade.

== Shipbuilding ==
Shipbuilding in England started in the many small creeks and rivers around the coast. A 14 m x 4 m Anglo-Saxon cargo boat (about 900 AD) was found at Graveney, Kent. A 13th century ship has been found at Magor Pill on the River Severn.

Originally open, ships began to have decks around the 12th century. Rudders were fitted on the stern by 1200 rather than the quarters as previously. In 1416 the king's ship "Anne" had two masts while the "Edward" was built in 1466 with three. Topsails were added by 1460, then a spritsail under a bowsprit. By 1510 a large warship had 12 sails but usually there were four.

By 1500 there were about 60 types of vessel, mostly cogs with deep hulls. However, from about 1450 "carvels" began to be built, based on the Portuguese caravel. These had non-overlapping planks on a frame. Gunports became used in the mid 16th century. The main type of English galleon had a low bow, a sleek hull and a large number of heavy guns. It was both speedy and maneuverable.

In the 16th century the Thames region had become the main shipbuilding area. Royal Dockyards were built and the Honourable East India Company also had shipbuilding facilities there. The East India Company built large well-defended ships which became known as "East Indiamen".

== Famous ships ==
=== Mary Rose ===
The Mary Rose was built in Portsmouth for Henry VIII between 1509 and 1511. She was the flagship of his navy and was one of the first with gunports. She was rebuilt in 1536. Mary Rose sank on 19 July 1545 off Portsmouth as she was leaving for an engagement with a French fleet that had attacked the English coast. Her remains were discovered in the 19th century but it was not until 1982 that she was raised from the seabed. Many artifacts were recovered and these are now on display in Portsmouth at the Royal Dockyard together with the ship's remains.

== Privateers and pirates ==
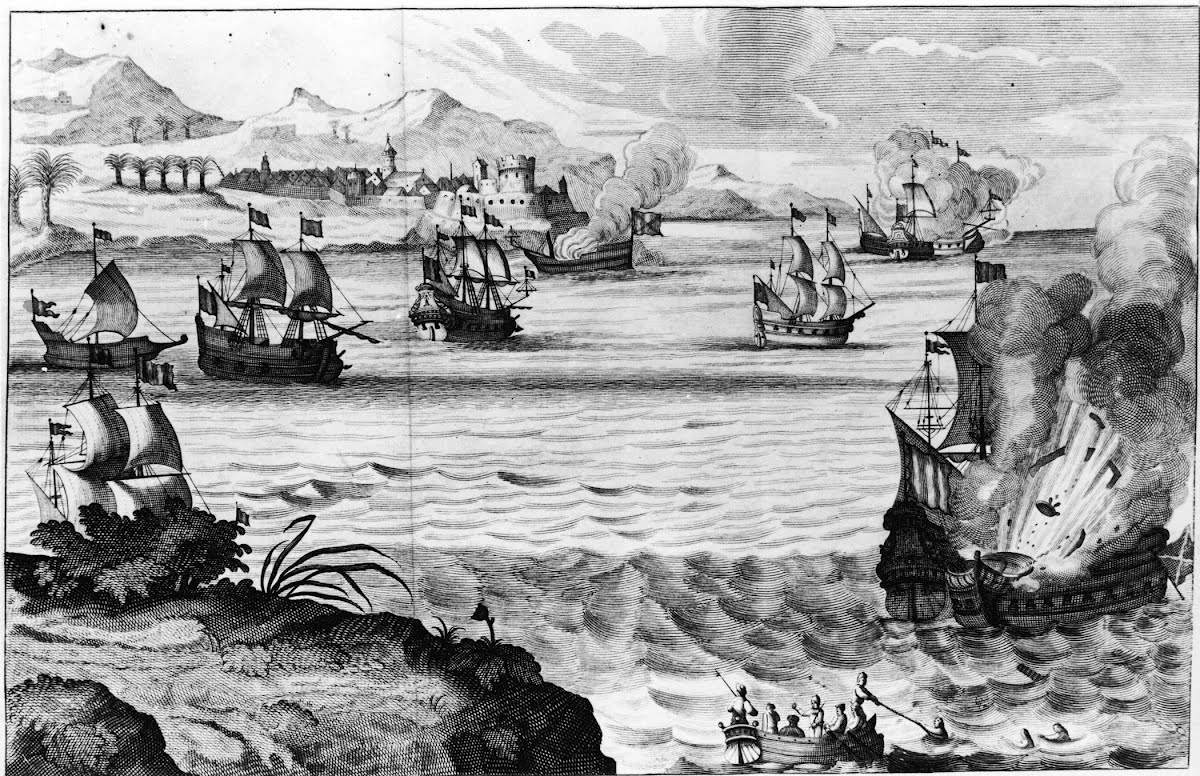
Henry Morgan defeats the Spanish fleet on Lake Maracaibo in 1669. From Alexandre Exquemelin's The Buccaneers of America

Privateers have a commission in the form of a "letter of marque" authorising the capture of enemy ships, while pirates do not. Both are robbery at sea or sometimes attacks from the sea onto shore. In 937 Irish pirates sided with Scots, Vikings and Welsh in an invasion of England but were driven back by Athelstan.

An Englishman called William Maurice was convicted of piracy in 1241 and is the first person known to have been hanged, drawn and quartered. In the Medieval period piracy was widespread and most pirate attacks came from France, which led to the organisation of the Cinque Ports.

Until 1536 piracy was a civil law problem and difficult to prove but it then became a common law offence. In the 1550s English gentlemen opposed to the reign of Phillip and Mary took refuge in France and were active in the English Channel as privateers having gained ships, money and men with letters of marque from Henry II of France. Six of their vessels were captured off Plymouth in 1556. Some of these men went on to assume positions of authority under Queen Elizabeth, such as Edward Horsey. The Sea Beggars (Geuzen) were a small group of Protestant noblemen in Queen Elizabeth's time and who were determined to drive the Spanish out of the Netherlands. They were led by William the Silent.

Queen Elizabeth allowed attacks on the Spanish but tried to prevent war. Gentlemen, merchants and sea captains combined to fit out ships. Perhaps the most famous English privateer was Sir Francis Drake, one of many operating against the Spanish treasure fleet. Thomas Cavendish was another and obtained valuable charts of the East during a circumnavigation.

An English ship battles with a Barbary ship and two galleys in Tripoli in 1676

Barbary pirates came from North Africa to attack shipping. In 1621 an expedition to North Africa was made against the Barbary pirates. In 1655 Blake routed them and started a campaign against them in the Caribbean.

Sir Henry Morgan, Captain William Kidd and Edward Teach (Blackbeard) were just three of the many English pirate leaders who operated in the Atlantic and Caribbean in the 17th century. In 1700 an Act of Parliament was passed to try pirates in Vice Admiral's Courts.

== See also ==
Maritime history

- Maritime history
- Maritime history of Europe
- Maritime history of the United Kingdom
- Whaling in the United Kingdom

Important people

- John Cabot (1450–1499)
- Francis Drake (1540–1596)
- Humphrey Gilbert (1539–1583)
- Walter Raleigh (1554–1618)
