= Maritime timeline =

This is a timeline of events in maritime history.

== Prehistory ==
- 1.5 – 1,000,000 BP: stone tool evidence at the Calio site in Sulawesi shows that hominins made an early deep sea crossing at least 1.04 million years ago.
- About 45,000 BC: first humans arrive in the islands of Southeast Asia, Papua New Guinea, and Australia via the now sunken Sundaland and Sahul land bridges. These migrations still required crossing expanses of water. They had no advanced watercraft technology, so it is presumed they crossed the Wallace Line via primitive floats or rafts.
- About 6,000 BC: Earliest evidence of dugout canoes.
- 5th millennium BC: Earliest known depiction of a shallow-water sailing boat made from bundled reeds from the Ubaid period of Mesopotamia in the Persian Gulf.
- About 3000 BC, the Austronesian people migrate from Taiwan to the Philippines, starting the sea-borne Austronesian expansion, which at its furthest extent reached Island Southeast Asia, Micronesia, Polynesia, Island Melanesia, and Madagascar.
- About 2,000 BC, Hannu dispatches a fleet along the Red Sea coast to the Land of Punt
- 1575–1520 BC Dover Bronze Age Boat, oldest known recovered plank vessel
- About 1500 BC:

- Austronesians colonize the Marianas Islands from the island of Luzon in the Philippines. The first long-distance ocean crossing in human history and the first humans to reach Remote Oceania.
- Austronesians in Island Southeast Asia establish the Austronesian maritime trade network with Southern India and Sri Lanka, resulting in an exchange of material culture, including boat and sailing technologies and crops like sugarcane, coconuts, and various spices. It is the precursor to both the Indian Ocean spice trade and Maritime Silk Road.

- About 1300 to 1200 BC: The Austronesian Lapita people, the direct ancestors of the Polynesians, reach and colonize the Schouten Islands, the Bismarck Archipelago, and the Solomon Islands.

== Antiquity ==
- About 1175 BC: Battle of the Delta, one of the first recorded naval battles, during Ancient Egypt's war against the Sea Peoples.
- 1194–1174 BC: Supposed timespan for the events of Homer's Iliad and Odyssey.
- About 1000 BC:

- Austronesians from Island Southeast Asia develop the tanja sail and junk sail.
- Austronesians from either the Philippines or Eastern Indonesia colonize Palau and Yap.

- About 900 BC: The Austronesian Lapita people reach Samoa and Tonga, which remained the furthest extent of the Austronesian expansion into Polynesia for the next 1,600 years.
- Around 600 BC: According to Herodotus, Necho II sends Phoenician expedition to circumnavigate Africa.
- 6th century BC: Canal of the Pharaohs is built in Egypt.
- 542 BC: First written record of a trireme.
- 5th century BC: Hanno the Navigator explores the coast of West Africa.
- 480 BC: Battle of Salamis, arguably the largest naval battle in ancient times.
- 256 BC: Battle of Cape Ecnomus, one of Ancient Rome's first major naval victories over Carthage during the First Punic War
- 247 BC: Lighthouse of Alexandria completed.
- 214 BC: Lingqu Canal built.
- 31 BC: Battle of Actium decides the Final War of the Roman Republic.
- 50 AD: Austronesians reach and colonize Madagascar from Borneo, crossing the entirety of the Indian Ocean. There is evidence of multiple back-and-forth crossings.
- 150 AD: Large Austronesian ships called K'un-lun po or Kolandiaphonta is noted to be trading with China and India from Island Southeast Asia, linking China to the trade routes in South Asia.

== Middle Ages ==
- 654: Battle of the Masts between the Byzantine Empire and the Rashidun Caliphate
- About 700:

- Austronesians (Javanese and Malay people) reach Ghana in West Africa.
- Austronesians (Polynesians) from Samoa and Tonga start the second expansion phase into Polynesia, by rapidly colonizing the Cook Islands, the Society Islands, the Tuamotus, and the Marquesas.

- 793: The raid of Lindisfarne, first recorded Viking raid
- 851: Javanese Sailendras stage a surprise attack on the Khmers by approaching the capital from the river, after a sea crossing from Java.
- About 900: Austronesians (Polynesians) colonize Hawaii
- 916: A polity called Zabag (presumably Java) invaded the Khmer Empire, using 1000 "medium-sized" vessels, which results in victory. The head of Khmer's king was then brought to Zabag.
- 931: Black labor was imported to Javanese Mataram kingdom from Jenggi (Zanzibar), Pujut (Australia), and Bondan (Papua).
- 945: Malay people from Srivijaya or Javanese people from Mataram attack the coast of Tanganyika and Mozambique with 1000 boats in an attempt to take the citadel of Qanbaloh.
- 984: Pound locks used in China; See Technology of the Song dynasty
- 986: Bjarni Herjolfsson crossed the Labrador Sea and saw North America.
- About 1000:

- Leif Ericson crossed the Labrador Sea to reach North America.
- Austronesians (Polynesians) colonize Easter Island and possibly made contact with South America.

- 1025: Chola invasion of Srivijaya
- 1088: Dream Pool Essays by Shen Kuo, first description of a magnetic compass.
- 12th century: Chinese people adopted the junk rig from Southeast Asian Austronesian traders visiting their southern coast.
- 1159: Lübeck is rebuilt, and the Hanseatic League is founded.
- About 1190: Alexander Neckam writes the first European description of a magnetic compass.
- 13th century: Portolan charts are introduced in the Mediterranean.
- About 1280: Austronesians (Polynesians) colonize New Zealand, the last major landmass to be populated.
- 1274: First Mongol invasion of Japan.
- 1325–1354: Ibn Battuta visits much of Africa and Asia
- 1350: Majapahit invades Samudera Pasai, with 400 jong.
- 1380: The nearly completed Bremen cog was wrecked, leaving an example of a ship type that was a mainstay of trade in the Hanseatic League
- 1398: Majapahit invades Kingdom of Singapura, with 300 jong and no less than 200,000 men.
- 1405: Zheng He's expeditions begins.

== Age of Discovery ==
- 1488: Bartolomeu Dias reaches the Cape of Good Hope.
- 1492: Christopher Columbus' first voyage, first recorded non-Arctic crossing of the Atlantic
- 1497: John Cabot reaches North American mainland, as first European since the Vikings.
- 1498
  - Vasco da Gama completes the Cape Route from Europe to India.
  - Columbus reaches continental South America.
- 1513: Jorge Álvares completes the first voyage from Europe to China.
- 1522: Ferdinand Magellan's last ship arrives in Europe, first recorded circumnavigation, and crossing of the Pacific Ocean
- 1571: Battle of Lepanto, last major naval battle fought entirely between galleys.
- 1580: Francis Drake returns to England and completes the 1st circumnavigation by an Englishman.
- 1588: The Spanish Armada is destroyed.
- 1589: The English Armada is defeated
- 1597: The 3rd Spanish Armada in revenge for the English attack on Cádiz fails, shifting naval superiority to England.
- 1602: The Dutch East India Company is founded.
- 1606: Willem Janszoon becomes the first European to reach Australia.
- 1620: Cornelis Drebbel constructs the first submarine.
- 1628: The Vasa sinks in Stockholm harbour on its maiden voyage.
- 1716: The Old Dock was built the first commercial Wet dock in the Port of Liverpool.
- 1736: John Harrison tests the first successful marine chronometer.
- 1757: First sextant constructed
- 1771: James Cook completes the first circumnavigation without casualties to scurvy.
- 1790: Battle of Svensksund, the last major battle with participation of galleys.

== Rise of steamboats and motorships ==
- 1783: Claude de Jouffroy constructs the first recorded steamboat.
- 1790: Canal Mania begins in Great Britain.
- 1805: The battle of Trafalgar marks the rise of the Royal Navy to a century of world domination.
- 1807: North River Steamboat, the first commercially successful steamboat, is launched.
- 1819: SS Savannah under Capt. Moses Rogers makes first transatlantic crossing using (auxiliary) steam power.
- 1820: Fabian Gottlieb von Bellingshausen discovers mainland Antarctica; the only recorded discovery of an uninhabited continent.
- 1839 - An early electric boat was developed by the German inventor Moritz von Jacobi in 1839 in St Petersburg, Russia. It was a 24-foot (7.3 m) boat which carried 14 passengers at 3 miles per hour (4.8 km/h). It was successfully demonstrated to Emperor Nicholas I of Russia on the Neva River.
- 1845: SS Great Britain becomes first iron steamer to cross the Atlantic.
- 1853: American commodore Matthew C. Perry arrives in Tokyo Bay, enforcing the Convention of Kanagawa in 1854.
- 1856: Paris Declaration Respecting Maritime Law outlaws privateering.
- 1859: The first ironclad warship, the Gloire, is launched.
- 1861: USS Ice Boat (1861), the first purpose-built icebreaker, is launched.
- 1862: The Battle of Hampton Roads becomes the first battle between ironclads.
- 1864: Ictineo II, the first submarine powered by an internal-combustion engine.
- 1865: CSS Shenandoah: The vessel was surrendered in Liverpool marking the last official surrender of the American Civil War.
- 1866: SS Agamemnon, the first commercially successful long distance steamer sails from Liverpool to China with only one stop for coal.
- 1866: SS Great Eastern: The world's largest ship that laid the first lasting Transatlantic telegraph cable.
- 1869: The Suez Canal opens.
- 1871: Adolf Erik Nordenskiöld braves the Northeast Passage on the Vega
- 1880: The American passenger steamship Columbia becomes the first outside usage of Thomas Edison's incandescent light bulb.
- 1881: SS Aberdeen, the first ship successfully powered by a triple expansion steam engine, making steam competitive with sail on all routes
- 1893: The Corinth Canal opens.
- 1894: The Turbinia, the world's first turbine-powered ship, is launched.
- 1895: The Kiel Canal opens.

== Diesel ==
- 1903: The Vandal, the world's first diesel-electric ship, is launched.
- 1906
  - Roald Amundsen conquers the Northwest Passage on the Gjøa.
  - HMS Dreadnought launched, commencing the era of battleships.
- 1912: The Titanic sinks in the North Atlantic. The wreck could not be discovered until 1985.
- 1914: The Panama Canal opens.
- 1916: Battle of Jutland, claimed to be the largest naval battle in history, counting tonnage of engaged ships.
- 1918: HMS Furious (47) becomes the first aircraft carrier used in warfare.
- 1937: USS Leary (DD-158) becomes the first American vessel to be equipped with radar.
- 1939: Battle of the Atlantic starts the longest continuous military campaign of World War II headquarters command based in Liverpool.
- 1941: The attack on Pearl Harbor starts the Pacific War.
- 1942: The battle of Midway marks the demise of battleships and the domination of aircraft carriers.
- 1944:
  - Normandy landings, the largest amphibious invasion in history.
  - Battle of the Philippine Sea, the largest carrier-to-carrier battle in history, involving a total of 24 aircraft carriers
  - Battle of Leyte Gulf, the largest naval battle in World War II and the largest naval battle in history in terms of ship displacement, area, and the number of (confirmed) personnel involved
- 1951: The first purpose-built container ships enter operation.
- 1955: USS Nautilus (SSN-571), the world's first nuclear-powered vessel, is launched.
- 1957: Aircraft supplants shipping as the leading mode of passenger Transatlantic travel
- 1959:
  - The USS Skate (SSN-578) surfaces at the North Pole.
  - The SR.N1, the first practical hovercraft, is launched.
- 1960: The Trieste descends to the Challenger Deep.
- 1962: The Cuban Missile Crisis; a major naval confrontation between the United States and the Soviet Union.
- 1977: Russian icebreaker Arktika makes the first surface voyage to the North Pole.
- 1982: Falklands War, one of the largest naval campaigns since World War II.
- 1985: The Sea Shadow (IX-529), an early stealth ship, is launched.
- 1987: The MV Doña Paz is lost, claiming 4,375 lives, the worst peacetime maritime disaster in history.
- 1994:
  - The Global Positioning System becomes operational.
  - MS Estonia is lost in the Baltic Sea.
- 2005: Piracy off the coast of Somalia becomes an international concern.
- 2007: Arktika 2007 becomes the first crewed expedition to the North Pole seabed.
- 2012:
  - Costa Concordia disaster.
  - James Cameron reaches the Challenger Deep solo with the Deepsea Challenger.
- 2013: MS Nordic Orion becomes the first freighter to complete the Northwest Passage.

== See also ==
- Age of Discovery
- History of navigation
- List of circumnavigations
- List of explorers
- List of naval battles
- Timeline for aircraft carrier service
- Timeline of European exploration
- Timeline of maritime migration and exploration
- Timeline of transportation technology
