= Timeline of maritime migration and exploration =

This timeline is an incomplete list of significant events of human migration and exploration by sea. This timeline does not include migration and exploration over land, including migration across land that has subsequently submerged beneath the sea, such as the initial settlement of Great Britain and Ireland.

== Maritime migration and exploration ==
Year	Event
~128,000 BCE	Archaic humans from North Africa migrate to the Mediterranean island of Crete.
~53,000 BCE	Modern humans from Southeast Asia migrate to Sahul (modern Australia, New Guinea, and Tasmania).
~36,000 BCE	People from East Asia inhabit the Japanese islands of Honshu and Kyushu.
~33,000 BCE	People from Southeast Asia migrate to the Maluku Islands, the Talaud Islands, and Palawan.
~30,000 BCE	People from eastern Siberia may have migrated into the Americas.
~20,500 BCE	People from eastern Siberia begin migrating to Beringia between Asia and the Americas by land and sea.
~18,000 BCE	People inhabit the Mediterranean island of Sardinia.
~14,000 BCE	Small groups of seafaring Beringians begin migrating along the Pacific Coast of the Americas.
~13,000 BCE	People from Honshu inhabit the Japanese island of Hokkaido.
~9000 BCE	People from Sardinia inhabit the Mediterranean island of Corsica.
~8800 BCE	People inhabit the Mediterranean island of Cyprus.
~8000 BCE	People from South America inhabit Isla Grande de Tierra del Fuego.
~6500 BCE	People inhabit the Mediterranean island of Crete.
~6000 BCE	People inhabit the Mediterranean island of Sicily.
~5900 BCE	People from Sicily inhabit the Mediterranean island of Malta.
~4500 BCE	People from South America inhabit the Caribbean islands of Puerto Rico, Hispaniola, Cuba, and Jamaica.
~4500 BCE	Early Paleo-Inuit migrate from northeastern Siberia across frozen seas to the island of Greenland.
~4500 BCE	Pre-Austronesian people (Dapenkeng culture) from southeastern China migrate to the island of Taiwan. They will mix with earlier inhabitants who had arrived from China when a land bridge existed. They later become the Austronesian peoples.
~3,000-2,200 BCE	Seafaring Austronesian peoples from Taiwan migrate to the Batanes Archipelago and northern Luzon. They later inhabit the rest of the Philippines and Island Southeast Asia, mixing with earlier inhabitants. This is the beginning of the Austronesian expansion, which at its furthest extent reached Micronesia, Polynesia, Island Melanesia, and Madagascar.
~2300 BCE	Shallow-water coastal trade ships from the Indus Valley begin sailing to Mesopotamia.
~2000-500 BCE	Jade maritime trading network is established between the Austronesian settlements in Taiwan and the northern Philippines. This later expanded to a much larger region encompassing the South China Sea during the Iron Age (500 BC to 500 AD), encompassing the Sa Huỳnh culture of Vietnam and other areas in Sarawak, eastern Cambodia, and central and southern Thailand.
~1,500 BCE	Seafaring Austronesian peoples migrate to the Mariana Islands, most likely having departed from the Bismarck Archipelago. It is the first long-distance ocean-crossing in human history and the first migration into Remote Oceania.
~1,500 BCE	Seafaring Austronesian peoples establish the Austronesian maritime trade network, the first true maritime trade network in the Indian Ocean. It established trade routes with Southern India and Sri Lanka, East Asia, the Arabian Peninsula, and Eastern Africa. It later became part of the Spice Trade and the Maritime Silk Road.
1500-300 BCE	Phoenicians sailed, traded, and settled around most of the Mediterranean Sea three millennia ago. Phoenicians sailed through the Pillars of Hercules (Strait of Gibraltar) and explored the Atlantic Coast of Iberia and North Africa.
~1,300 BCE	Seafaring Austronesian peoples from the Philippines and Maluku migrate to the Schouten Islands, Bismarck Archipelago, the Solomon Islands, and the northern coastline of New Guinea. They establish the Lapita culture and mix with the earlier Papuan settlers who arrived by land bridges and short inter-island hops.
~1,200 BCE	Seafaring Austronesian peoples from the Lapita culture of Island Melanesia migrate to Vanuatu, New Caledonia, and Fiji.
~1,000 BCE	Seafaring Austronesian peoples from the Philippines and Maluku migrate to Palau and Yap in western Micronesia.
~900-800 BCE	Seafaring Austronesian peoples from the Lapita culture of Island Melanesia settle Samoa, Tonga, and nearby islands; later becoming the Polynesians.
~600 BCE	Egyptian Pharaoh Necho II commissioned a Phoenician ship that sailed from the Red Sea, around Africa, to the mouth of the Nile River in three years, in a questionable legend reported by Greek historian Herodotus.
~500 BCE	Carthaginian Hanno the Navigator explores the Atlantic Coast of Africa.
~500 BCE	Paleo-Inuit migrate across frozen seas to the North American Arctic.
~325 BCE	Greek geographer Pytheas of Massalia from Provence explores the British Isles and the North Sea.
~200 BCE	Seafaring Austronesian peoples from the Lapita culture of Island Melanesia migrate to eastern Micronesia (Caroline Islands, Chuuk, Pohnpei, Marshall Islands, etc.), meeting up with earlier migrations in western Micronesia.
~10	Possible settlement of North Iwo Jima and Chichijima in Japan's Nanpō Islands.
~200	Chinese envoys sail through the Strait of Malacca to Kanchipuram in India.
~420	Seafaring Austronesian peoples from the Sunda Islands of Southeast Asia colonize the African islands of Madagascar and the Comoros, crossing the entirety of the Indian Ocean.
674	Chinese explorer Daxi Hongtong reaches Aden in Yemen.
~700	Polynesians (Austronesians) colonize the Cook Islands, Society Islands, and the Marquesas of the Pacific Ocean.
~750	Monks from the islands of Dál Riata settle on the North Atlantic island of Iceland.
~750	Austronesian ships from Sunda Islands of Southeast Asia round the Cape of Good Hope and reach Ghana in Africa.
793	Norse Vikings raid the Lindisfarne Priory, off the coast of the island of Great Britain.
~800s	Several islands in the Nanpō Islands potentially inhabited by Chamoru of the Latte period.
870	Norwegian Náttfari settles on the North Atlantic island of Iceland.
~900	Polynesians (Austronesians) colonize the Hawaiian Islands.
978	Icelander Snæbjörn galti Hólmsteinsson sails to the island of Greenland and unsuccessfully attempts to settle the island.
982	Exiled from Iceland for three years, Norwegian Erik Thorvaldsson (Erik the Red) explores the island of Greenland. Erik leads the Icelandic settlement of Greenland in 985.
~1001	Iceland-born Greenlander Leif Erikson, son of Erik Thorvaldsson, establishes a settlement at L'Anse aux Meadows on the island of Newfoundland and explores nearby lands in continental North America.
~1010	Norsemen abandon the island of Newfoundland and North America.
~1000-1200	Polynesians (Austronesians) settle Rapa Nui (Easter Island).
~1100-1280	Earliest evidence of Austronesian contact (possibly by the Makassar or Sama-Bajau) with Indigenous Australians in northern Australia. It preceded the later trepanging network in the 1700s.
~1250	The Thule people of the Arctic Coast of Alaska inhabit the Arctic islands of North America and Greenland.
1258	Japanese sailors land on the Hawaiian island of O'ahu.
1270	Japanese sailors carrying sugar cane land on the Hawaiian island of Maui.
~1320	Polynesians (Austronesians) colonize Aotearoa (New Zealand), also establishing colonies in the Kermadec Islands, Norfolk Island, and Rekohu (Chatham Islands).
~1350	The Inuit of the Alaskan Arctic inhabit the Arctic islands of North America and Greenland.
1403	The Yongle Emperor (Zhu Di) orders Grand Director Ma He to construct a Foreign Expeditionary Armada to explore lands of the Western Ocean (Indian Ocean) and exert Chinese hegemony. The emperor honors Ma He with the name Zheng He.
1405	Zheng He departs from Nanjing with 27,800 men on 255 ships for a voyage of two years. The fleet visits Champa, Java, Malacca, Aru, Semudera, Lambri, Sri Lanka, Quilon, and Calicut.
1407	Zheng He departs from Nanjing with 247 ships for a second voyage of two years.
1409	Zheng He departs from Nanjing with 27,000 men for a third voyage of two years.
1413	Zheng He departs from Nanjing for a fourth voyage of two years. The fleet ventures as far west as the island of Hormuz in the Persian Gulf.
1417	Zheng He departs from Nanjing for a fifth voyage of two years. The fleet ventures as far west as Hormuz, Yemen, Somalia, and Kenya.
1421	Zheng He departs from Nanjing for a sixth voyage of 18 months.
1431	At the direction of the new Xuande Emperor (Zhu Zhanji), Zheng He departs from Nanjing for a seventh voyage of two years.
1434	Portuguese captain Gil Eanes sailing for Prince Henry the Navigator (Infante Don Henrique of Portugal) rounds Cape Bojador in Western Sahara. This voyage marks the start of the Portuguese exploration and exploitation of Africa.
1436	The new Zhengtong Emperor (Zhu Qizhen) bans the construction of sea-going imperial vessels.
~1450	Norsemen abandon Greenland.
1460	Genoan António de Noli and Portuguese Diogo Gomes, navigators sailing for Prince Henry the Navigator, discover the islands of Cabo Verde.
1473	Portuguese navigator Lopes Gonçalves becomes the first European to sail across the Equator and reaches Cape Saint Catherine in Gabon.
1482	King John II of Portugal orders navigator Diogo Cão to explore the Atlantic Coast of Africa. Cão sails up the Congo River to Shark Point and then sails south to Cape Santa Maria in Angola.
1485	King John II of Portugal orders navigator Diogo Cão to return to Africa. Cão sails up the Congo River to Matadi and then sails south to Cape Cross in Namibia.
1488	King John II of Portugal orders navigator Bartolomeu Dias to search for a possible route to India. Dias rounds the Cape of Good Hope in South Africa.
1492	Genoan Christopher Columbus (Cristoffa Corombo) leads an expedition of three ships for Queen Isabella I of Castile, seeking a short westward sea route to China. Columbus sails west across the Atlantic Ocean and lands on the Caribbean island of San Salvador on 12 October 1492. Columbus explores the Caribbean in the belief that China lies a short distance west. Columbus establishes a fort at La Navidad on the island of Hispaniola, the first European settlement in the Americas. Columbus will make three more voyages to the Caribbean in an effort to reach China.
1493	Queen Isabella I of Castile directs Christopher Columbus to lead a second expedition of 17 ships and 1200 men to colonize the Caribbean. Columbus finds La Navidad destroyed and establishes a new settlement at La Isabela farther east on Hispaniola. The colonists will enslave native Arawak people.
1497	King Henry VII of England commissions Venetian navigator John Cabot (Giovanni Caboto) to search for a route to China. Cabot lands on the island of Newfoundland, the first European to explore the island since the departure of the Vikings four centuries earlier.
1497	King John II of Portugal orders navigator Vasco da Gama to lead an expedition of four ships and 170 men to seek a sea route to India. Da Gama rounds the Cape of Good Hope and sails across the Indian Ocean, landing at Kappadu in India on 20 May 1498.
1498	On his third voyage to the Caribbean, Christopher Columbus lands on the Paria Peninsula of Venezuela, thus becoming the first European to reach South America, which he thinks may be the Garden of Eden.
1499	Florentine navigator Amerigo Vespucci sailing for the Catholic Monarchs of Spain reaches the mouth of the Amazon River.
1500	King Manuel I of Portugal dispatches Major-Captain Pedro Álvares Cabral to lead an expedition of 13 ships and 1500 men to India. Cabral sails to Cabo Verde and then south to Brazil, which he claims for his king. Cabral sails south along the coast of Brazil and then east around the Cape of Good Hope and across the Indian Ocean to Calicut in India.
1501	King Manuel I of Portugal dispatches Spanish captain Alonso de Ojeda and Florentine navigator Amerigo Vespucci to explore the extent of newly claimed Brazil. Ojeda follows the Brazilian coast south to Guanabara Bay. The voyage convinces Vespucci that the land could not be the East Indies but rather a new continent. In 1507 German cartographer Martin Waldseemüller will name the new continent America in Vespucci's honor.
1502	On his fourth voyage to the Caribbean, Christopher Columbus lands at Puerto Castilla in Honduras, thus becoming the first European to reach Central America.
1501	King Manuel I of Portugal dispatches cousins Afonso and Francisco de Albuquerque to lead an expedition of six ships to India. They battle the Zamorin of Calicut and ally with the King of Cochin who grants them the right to build fort Immanuel in 1503, the first European settlement in India.
1505	Portuguese-born Spanish explorer Diego Columbus, the elder son of Christopher Columbus, brings African slaves to the Caribbean island of Hispaniola. This marks the beginning of the Atlantic slave trade.
1508	Ferdinand II of Aragon, Regent of Castile commissions Juan Ponce de León to settle the island of San Juan Bautista (Puerto Rico). Ponce de León founds Caparra, the first European settlement on the island.
1508	King Henry VII of England commissions Sebastian Cabot (Sebastiano Caboto), the son of John Cabot, to search for the Northwest Passage to China. Cabot explores the Atlantic Coast of North America from Ungava Bay to Chesapeake Bay.
1509	King Manuel I of Portugal dispatches Portuguese fidalgo Diogo Lopes de Sequeira to the wealthy Sultanate of Malacca on the Malay Peninsula. Portuguese general Afonso de Albuquerque will seize Malacca in 1511.
1510	Spanish conquistador Vasco Núñez de Balboa establishes Santa María la Antigua del Darién in Colombia, the first European settlement in the continental Americas.
1511	Diego Columbus directs Spanish conquistador Diego Velázquez de Cuéllar to settle the island of Cuba. Cuéllar establishes Baracoa, the first European settlement on the island.
1513	Juan Ponce de León, the Spanish governor of San Juan Bautista (Puerto Rico), explores Florida which he assumes is another island. He becomes the first European to explore continental North America since the departure of the Vikings four centuries earlier.
1513	Portuguese explorer Jorge Álvares becomes the first European to reach China by sea.
1513	Vasco Núñez de Balboa, the Spanish governor of Veragua (Panama), crosses the Isthmus of Panama to the shore of a sea he names the South Sea (Pacific Ocean). Balboa claims all lands draining into the sea for Spain.
1515	Spanish Franciscan friars establish a mission at Cumaná, the first European settlement in Venezuela.
1516	Portuguese-born Spanish explorer Juan Díaz de Solís reaches Río de la Plata between Uruguay and Argentina.
1518	Spanish conquistador Juan de Grijalva explores the east coast of Yucatan and Mexico.
1519	Spanish Captain-General Hernán Cortés establishes the first European settlement in Mexico at Villa Rica de la Vera Cruz on 18 May 1519. Cortés then marches to the Aztec capital of Tenochtitlan.
1519	On 15 August 1519, Spanish governor Pedro Arias Dávila establishes Panamá (Panama City) in Panama, the first European settlement in Central America.
1520	King Charles I of Spain directs Portuguese navigator Ferdinand Magellan (Fernão de Magalhães) to lead an expedition of five ships and 270 men to seek a westward sea route to the East Indies. Magellan discovers the Strait of Magellan and encounters a sea he names the Peaceful Sea (Pacific Ocean). Magellan becomes the first explorer to cross the Pacific Ocean, which proves far vaster than he imagined and requires an arduous four-month voyage.
1521	Ferdinand Magellan reaches Guam and the Philippines. He is killed on the island of Mactan in the Philippines, but the expedition's two remaining ships attempt to return to Spain.
1522	On 6 September 1522, the carrack Victoria arrives in Sanlúcar de Barrameda, Spain with the 18 survivors of the Magellan Expedition, having circumnavigated the Earth.
1526	Portuguese traders bring African slaves to Brazil. This marks the beginning of the Portuguese slave trade.
1526	Spanish conquistador Lucas Vázquez de Ayllón sails with six ships from Santo Domingo on Hispaniola to establish a colony north of the Bahama Islands. Ayllón selects the mouth of the Sapelo River in Georgia and establishes the colony of San Miguel de Gualdape on 29 September 1526. The colony fails in a few months and the survivors return to Hispaniola.
1527	Venetian Captain-General Sebastian Cabot sailing for the Spanish Council of the Indies builds the Sancti Spiritu fort on the Carcarañá River, the first European settlement in Argentina.
1532	Portuguese fidalgo Martim Afonso de Sousa establishes Porto dos Escravos in Brazil, the first Portuguese settlement in the Americas.
1533	Spanish Marquesado Don Hernán Cortés orders Diego de Becerra to sail from Colima in Mexico in search of the mythical Strait of Anián and the Islands of California. Mutineers murder Becerra and land at the Bay of La Paz in Baja California Sur.
1539	Spanish Marquesado Don Hernán Cortés orders Francisco de Ulloa to lead an expedition of three ships to search for the mythical Strait of Anián. Ulloa sails from Acapulco north along the Pacific Coast of Mexico. Ulloa circumnavigates and names the Sea of Cortez (Gulf of California) and sails around the Baja California Peninsula to Isla de Cedros, proving that the Sea of Cortez is a gulf, not a strait, and that Baja California is a peninsula. (Spanish nautical secrecy allows the notion of an Island of Cali Fornia to persist for more than two centuries.)
1542	Antonio de Mendoza, the first Viceroy of New Spain, directs Juan Rodríguez Cabrillo and Ruy López de Villalobos to lead explorations of the Pacific Ocean from Barra de Navidad in Jalisco. On 27 June 1542, Cabrillo sails northwest with three ships to explore the Pacific Coast of Mexico and the Californias. Cabrillo reaches the Russian River before turning back. Cabrillo dies in the Channel Islands on the return voyage. On 1 November 1542, López de Villalobos sails west with six galleons and 400 men across the Pacific Ocean to the East Indies. The expedition explores the Philippine Islands and the eastern Islands of Indonesia, but is captured by Portuguese authorities in 1544. López de Villalobos dies on 4 April 1544, in a Portuguese prison cell on the Island of Amboyna. The Portuguese send the 117 survivors of the expedition to Lisbon.
1559	Spanish conquistador Tristán de Luna y Arellano sails with 11 ships from San Juan de Ulua in Veracruz to establishes the colony of Santa Maria de Ochuse at Pensacola Bay in Florida. The colony was largely destroyed by a hurricane after only six weeks, although the survivors are not rescued until 1561.
1560	King Philip II of Spain orders Captain-General Pedro Menéndez de Avilés, to lead the first Armada de la Carrera (Treasure Fleet) from Mexico and the Caribbean back to Spain.
1562	English slave trader John Hawkins brings African slaves to Hispaniola. This marks the beginning of the English slave trade.
1564	French explorer René Goulaine de Laudonnière leads an expedition of three ships to found the colony of Fort de la Caroline on the May River in Florida.
1564	Spanish conquistador Miguel López de Legazpi leads an expedition of five ships and 500 soldiers from Barra de Navidad in Jalisco to the Philippines. López de Legazpi lands in the Mariana Islands and proceeds to the Philippines. In 1565, López de Legazpi founds the colony of Villa del Santisimo Nombre de Jesús on the Island of Cebu, the first Spanish settlement in the East Indies.
1565	King Philip II of Spain orders Captain-General Pedro Menéndez de Avilés, to drive the French out of Florida. Aviles sails for Florida and on 8 September 1564 establishes the settlement of San Agustín (St. Augustine) on the Matanzas River. The city persists today. Avilés then attacks Fort de la Caroline and murders most of its inhabitants.
1605	French explorer Pierre Dugua, Sieur de Mons establishes a colony on Saint Croix Island in Maine. The following year, the colony moves to Port-Royal in Nova Scotia to become the first European settlement in Canada since the departure of the Vikings five centuries earlier.
1606	Dutch captain Willem Janszoon sails around the Cape of Good Hope to the Indonesian island of Java. He then sails to New Guinea and Australia, becoming the first European to explore those lands.
1607	In 1606, King James I of England charters the Virginia Company of London to establish colonies in North America. The following year the company establishes Jamestown in Virginia.
1616	Dutch explorer Willem Cornelisz Schouten sails around Cape Horn and west across the Pacific Ocean, visiting numerous islands before reaching the Indonesian island of Java.
1619	In late August 1619, the Dutch privateer ship The White Lion arrives at Point Comfort, Virginia with 20 slaves from Ndongo in present-day Angola. The Africans are sold to Governor George Yeardley and the Cape Merchant of the Colony of Virginia. The White Lion and the Treasurer had captured the Africans from the Portuguese slave ship São João Bautista bound for Veracruz. The White Lion and the Treasurer were commissioned by English Puritan nobleman Robert Rich, 2nd Earl of Warwick. This marks the beginning of the American slave trade.
1624	France brings African slaves to settle Guiana in South America. This marks the beginning of the French slave trade.
1642	Dutch explorer Abel Tasman explores Tasmania, New Zealand, and the Fiji Islands.
1648	Russian explorer Semyon Ivanovich Dezhnev rounds Cape Dezhnev in the Bering Strait.
1671	The Danish West India Company enters the Atlantic slave trade.
1675	English merchant Anthony de la Roché is blown off course and seeks refuge in a bay of the South Atlantic island of South Georgia.
1690	English captain John Strong lands in the Falkland Islands of the Atlantic Ocean.
1722	Dutch explorer Jacob Roggeveen lands on the Pacific island of Rapa Nui (Easter Island).
1732	Russian geodesist Mikhail Spiridonovich Gvozdev sails from Petropavlovsk on Kamchatka to Cape Dezhnev, the easternmost point of continental Eurasia, thence east across the Bering Strait to Cape Prince of Wales, the westernmost point of the continental Americas. Gvozdev proceeds to chart the northwest coast of Alaska.
1767	British explorer Samuel Wallis lands on Tahiti in the Society Islands of the Pacific Ocean.
1770	British explorer James Cook explores and circumnavigates the Pacific islands of New Zealand. Cook lands at Botany Bay in Australia and explores the Pacific Coast of the continent.
1775	British explorer James Cook explores the South Atlantic island of South Georgia and claims it for the United Kingdom.
1778	British explorer James Cook explores the Hawaiian Islands and the Northwestern Coast of North America from Alta California to the Chukchi Sea.
1820	Russian, British, and American ships first sight Antarctica.
1869	The Suez Canal between the Mediterranean Sea and the Red Sea opens.
1880	Finnish-born Swedish explorer Adolf Erik Nordenskiöld sails through the Northeast Passage and completes the first circumnavigation of Eurasia by way of the Suez Canal on the SS Vega.
1906	Norwegian explorer Roald Amundsen becomes the first to sail through the Northwest Passage on the Gjøa.
1914	The Panama Canal between the Caribbean Sea and the Pacific Ocean opens.
1921	Danish explorer Lauge Koch becomes the first documented person to reach what he would call Kaffeklubben Island, now recognized as the northernmost undisputed piece of permanent land.
1956	The United States Navy opens Naval Air Facility McMurdo on McMurdo Sound in Antarctica.
1957	American explorer Finn Ronne, under the United States Navy Reserve, discovers Berkner Island off the coast of Antarctica.
1958	The American nuclear submarine USS Nautilus becomes the first ship to reach the North Pole and the first ship to cross the Arctic Ocean.
1960	Swiss oceanographer Jacques Piccard and American oceanographer Don Walsh descend to the bottom of the Challenger Deep (-10,911 meters) in the Mariana Trench of the Pacific Ocean in the bathyscaphe Trieste on 23 January 1960.

== See also ==
- Age of Discovery
- Ancient maritime history
- Chinese exploration
- Chronology of European exploration of Asia
- Colonization
- Columbian exchange
- Early human migrations
- European exploration of Africa
- History of navigation
- History of slavery
- Human migration
- Indian maritime history
- Major explorations after the Age of Discovery
- Maritime history
- Maritime history of Europe
- Maritime Silk Road
- Maritime timeline
- Ming treasure voyages
- Naval history of China
- Polynesian navigation
- Portuguese maritime exploration
- Spanish colonization of the Americas
- Timeline of European exploration
- Timeline of prehistory
- Timeline of the Ming treasure voyages
- Treaty of Tordesillas
- Voyages of Christopher Columbus
