= Maritime history of Europe =

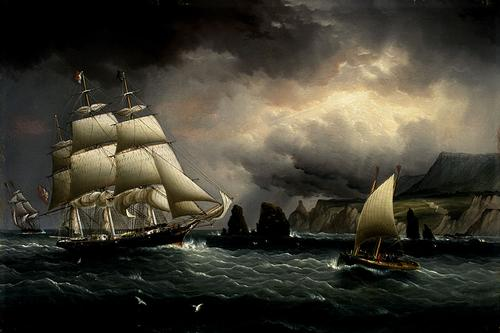
The Clipper Ship Flying Cloud off the Needles, Isle of Wight, off the southern English coast. Painting by James E. Buttersworth

The Maritime history of Europe represents the era of recorded human interaction with the sea in the northwestern region of Eurasia in areas that include shipping and shipbuilding, shipwrecks, naval battles, and military installations and lighthouses constructed to protect or aid navigation and the development of Europe. Europe is situated between several navigable seas and intersected by navigable rivers running into them in a way which greatly facilitated the influence of maritime traffic and commerce. Great battles have been fought in the seas off of Europe that changed the course of history forever, including the Battle of Salamis in the Mediterranean, the Battle of Gravelines at the eastern end of the English Channel in the summer of 1588, in which the “Invincible” Spanish Armada was defeated, the Battle of Jutland in World War I, and World War II’s U-boat war.

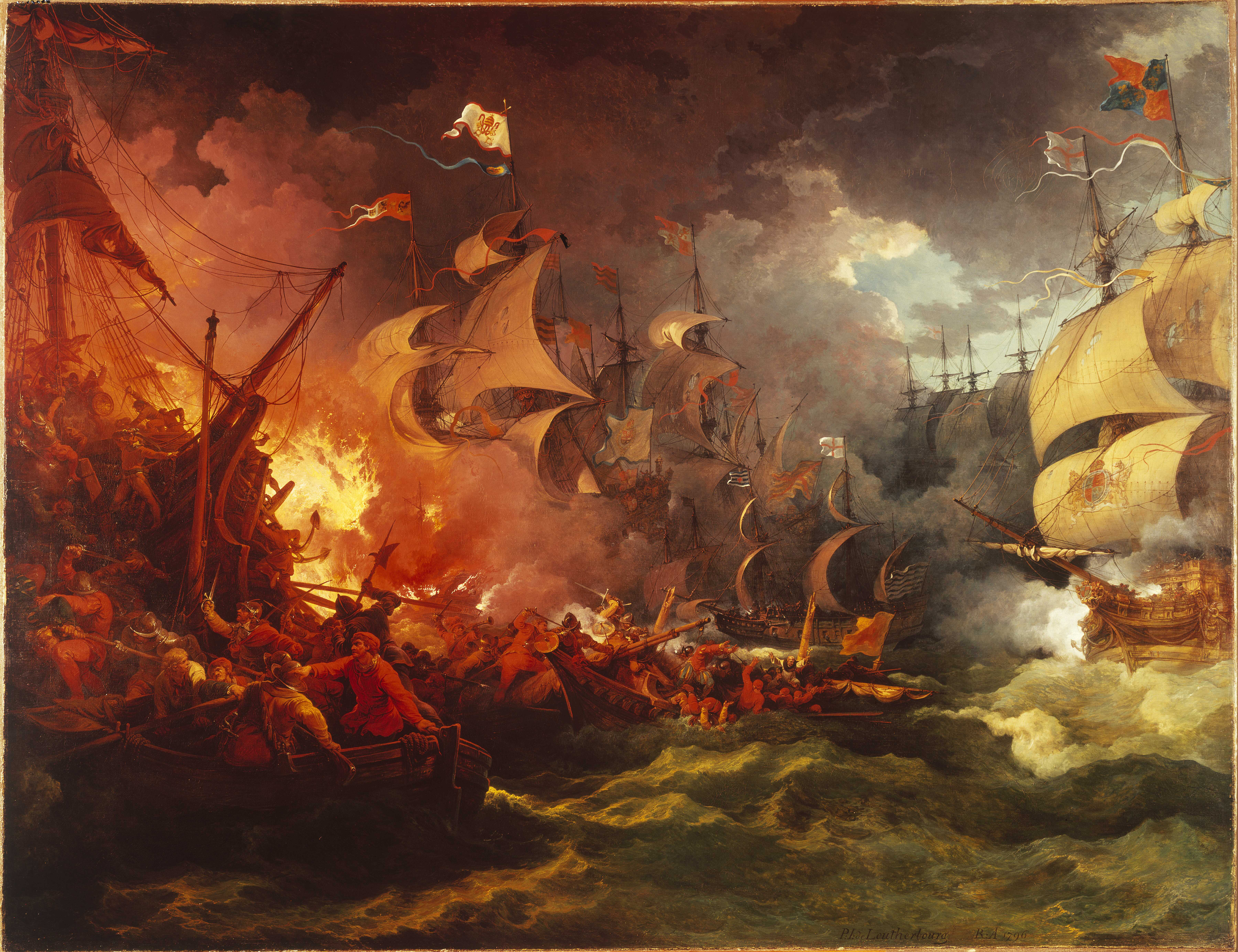
Defeat of the Spanish Armada, 1588-08-08 by Philippe-Jacques de Loutherbourg, painted 1796, depicts the battle of Gravelines.

== Ancient times ==
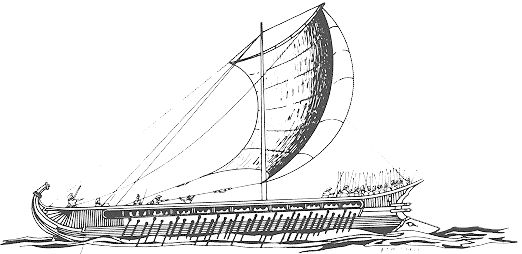
Greek trireme

Egyptian sources mention regular shipments of copper from the island of Cyprus, which arrived at the city of Byblos as early as 2600 BCE. The Minoans of Crete are the earliest known European seafarers of the Mediterranean Sea. Little is known of their ships, but they reportedly traded pottery as far west as Sicily. According to the historian Thucydides, by 1900 BCE. their King Minos commanded a navy and conquered the islands of the Aegean. The Mycenaeans would obtain maritime hegemony in the region around 1600 BCE and hold it until the attacks of the Sea Peoples, which disrupted the maritime culture and the naval balance of power in the Eastern Mediterranean during the Late Bronze Age collapse between 1200 and 900 BCE.

During the following centuries the ancient Greek navies began to use ships with two banks of oars; and by the 6th century BCE, the three-banked trireme had been adopted by all sea-faring city states. Alongside the Phoenicians, who from around 1200 BCE had settled in the Levant and Northern Africa, Greek trading fleets and navies dominated the Mediterranean until the ascent of Rome in the third and second centuries BCE.

Greek ships, methods of engagement, movement and command under the Athenian general Themistocles proved to be highly effective during the Greco-Persian Wars (499 to 449 BCE). Relatively small Greek forces successfully delayed the Persian fleet in a series of naval engagements in 480 BCE. Naval conflict culminated in the straits between the port of Piraeus and Salamis Island in the Battle of Salamis (September 480 BCE), when 371 Greek triremes and pentekonters defeated King Xerxes' Persian fleet of over 1,200 ships, which included Phoenician, Egyptian, Cilician and Cypriot contingents. The city of Athens, which had risen to naval supremacy among the Greek city states, was defeated in the Peloponnesian War and lost its fleet in the Battle of Aegospotami against the Peloponnesian League under Lysander in 405 BCE.

Around 325 B.C. Pytheas, a Greek geographer and explorer, undertook a voyage of exploration to northwestern Europe (modern-day Great Britain and Ireland) and beyond. In his account On The Ocean (Τὰ περὶ τοῦ Ὠκεανοῦ), which is only known through the writings of Strabo and Pliny the Elder, he introduces the idea of the land of Thule and describes Celtic and Germanic tribes, the Arctic, polar ice and the midnight sun.

== Republican and Imperial Rome ==
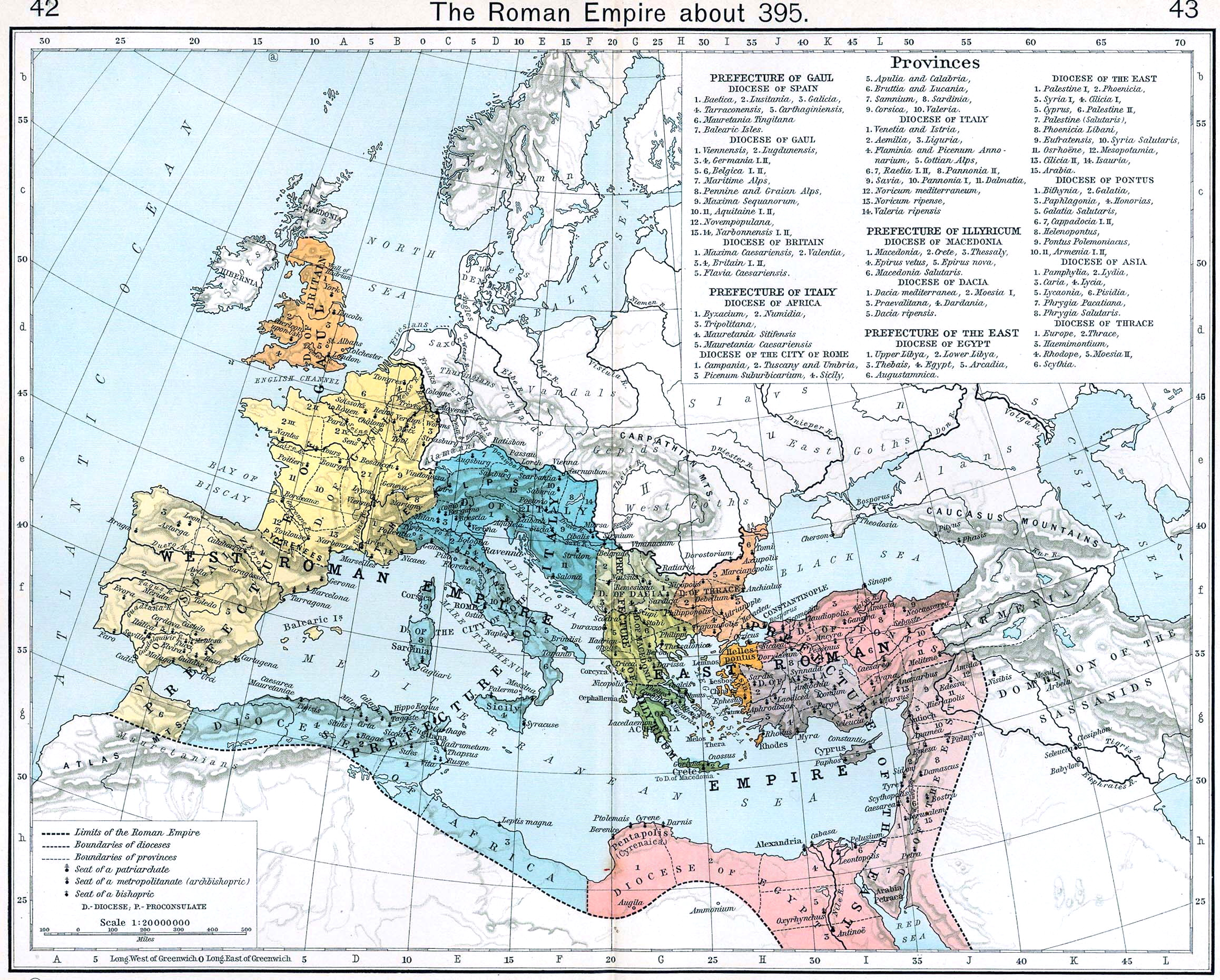
The administrative divisions of the Roman Empire in 395, under Theodosius I.

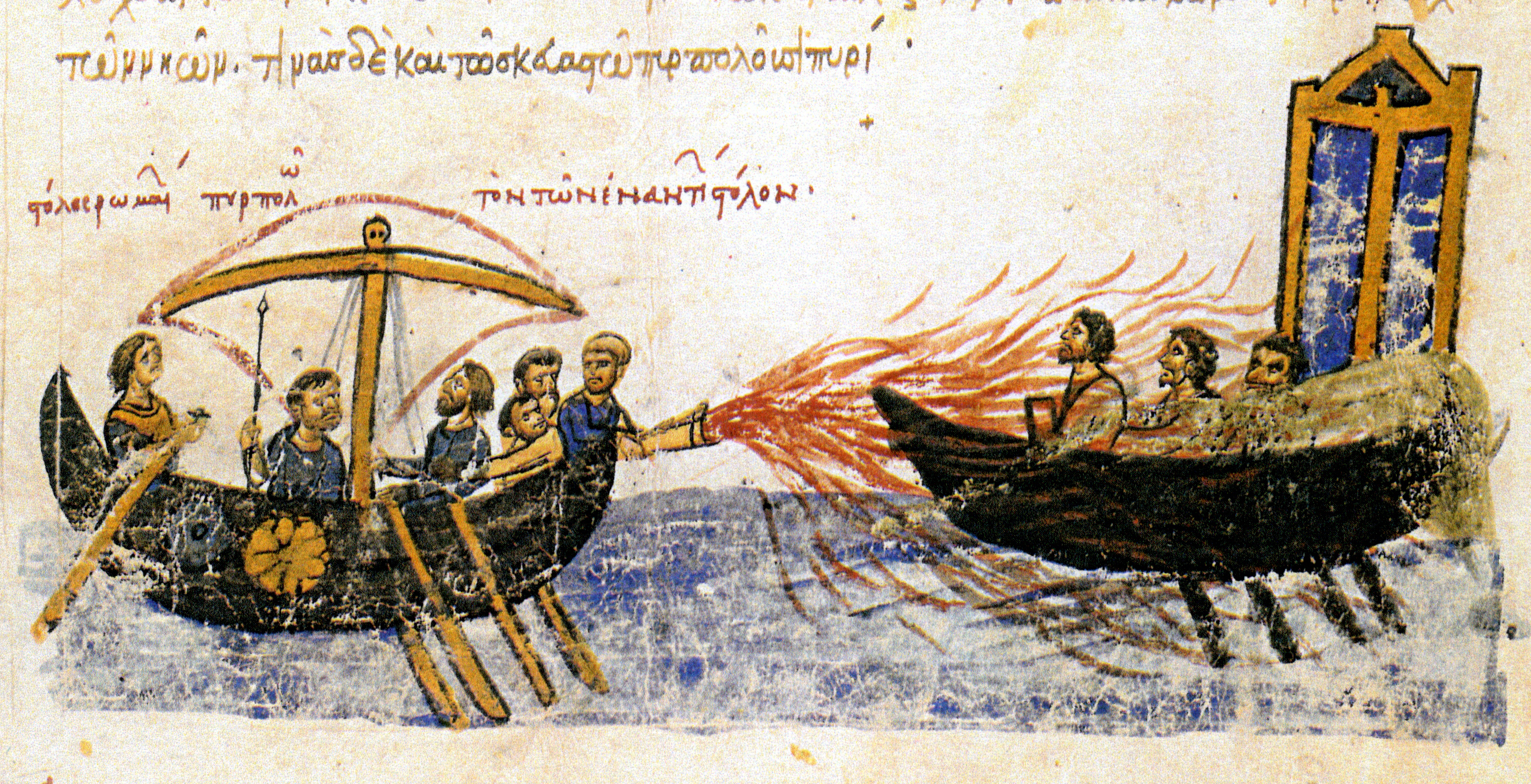
Depiction of Greek fire in the Madrid Skylitzes manuscript.

During the First Punic War (3rd century BCE) the admiralty of the Roman Republic conceived new and progressive ways of fleet construction, development and composition in order to successfully engage the Carthaginian navy. Victories at the Battle of Mylae, the Battle of Cape Ecnomus, the Battle of Cape Hermaeum and the Battle of the Aegates encouraged the Romans to pursue naval-based warfare and strategies in order to push the center of combat to the Carthaginian heartland in North Africa.

By the end of the Macedonian Wars in the latter half of the 2nd century BC, Roman control over the Aegean Sea was undisputed, and full hegemony over the entire Mediterranean Sea, now referred to as Mare Nostrum ("our sea") had been established.

Roman galleys helped to build the Roman Empire. The empire's struggle with Carthage inspired them to build and to fight in war galleys, but the galleys did not have much cargo space, so "round ships" were constructed for trade, especially with Egypt. Many of these ships reached 200 feet (60 m) in length and were capable of carrying over a thousand tons of cargo. These ships used sail power alone to haul commodities in the Mediterranean. The volume of trade that the Roman merchant fleet carried was larger than any other until the Industrial Revolution. We know quite a bit about these round ships, since Romans, like Egyptians and Greeks, left records in stone, sometimes even on a sarcophagus.

There were many shipwrecks of Roman vessels, which can be explained by the very large number of trading vessels during Roman times: the volume of sea trade in the Mediterranean was not equalled until the 19th century, and led to a large number of shipwrecks.

=== Byzantine Empire ===
The western Mediterranean came under the control of the barbarians, after their invasion split the Empire in two, while Byzantium dominated the eastern half of the sea. The eastern empire lasted until 1453, such was the efficiency of the Byzantine navy, with its fleets armed with Byzantine fire (or Greek fire), a mixture of naphtha oil and saltpetre, fired through tubes in the bows of the ship. Enemy ships were often afraid to get too close to the Byzantine fleet, since the liquid fire gave the Byzantines a considerable advantage.

== The Viking Age ==
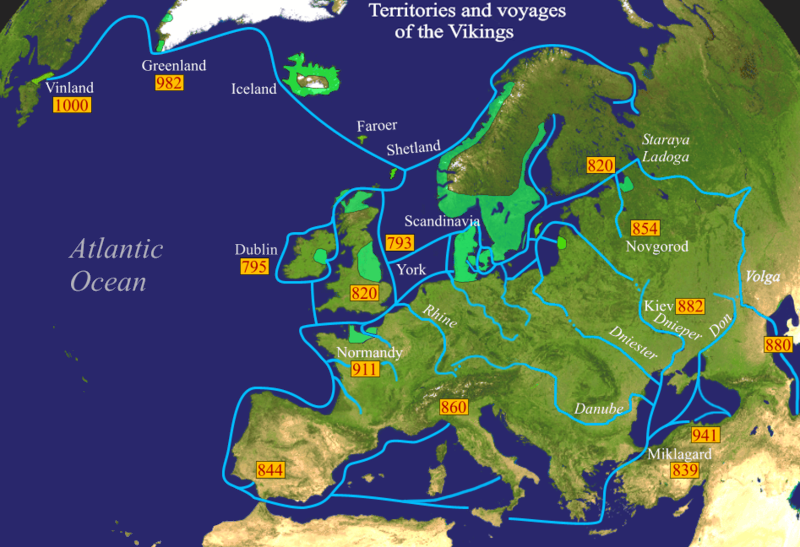
Voyages of the Norsemen

Also called the Vikings, the Norsemen raided towns and villages along the coasts of the British Isles, Scandinavia, as far south as Cádiz, Spain and even attacked Pisa, Italy in 860. They sailed up the Seine River in France, settled Normandy (which derives its name from the Norsemen), and settled Dublin after invading Ireland. Varangians were more concerned with trading than raiding, and sailed along Russian rivers and opened commercial routes to the Caspian Sea as well as the Black Sea.

The Vikings were the best naval architects of their day, and the Viking longship was both large and versatile. A longship found at Oseberg, Norway, was 76 feet 6 inches (23.32 m), more than 17 feet (5.18 m) wide, and had a draft of only 3 feet (0.91 m). The shallow draft enabled them to navigate far inland in shallow rivers. Later on during the Viking period some of the ships were reported to be over 100 feet (30 m) long.

"From the fury of the Norsemen, good Lord, deliver us" has entered apocryphal knowledge as a common prayer among the people of western Europe during the period of the Norse raiders from the late 8th century to the 11th century. According to the website Viking Answer Lady, which in turn cites Magnus Magnusson's Vikings! as its reference,

No 9th century text has ever been discovered containing these words, although numerous medieval litanies and prayers contain general formulas for deliverance against unnamed enemies. The closest documentable phrase is a single sentence, taken from an antiphony for churches dedicated to St. Vaast or St. Medard: Summa pia gratia nostra conservando corpora et custodita, de gente fera Normannica nos libera, quae nostra vastat, Deus, regna, "O highest, pious grace, free us, O God, by preserving our bodies and those in our keeping from the cruel Norse people who ravage our realms.".

== The Hanseatic League ==
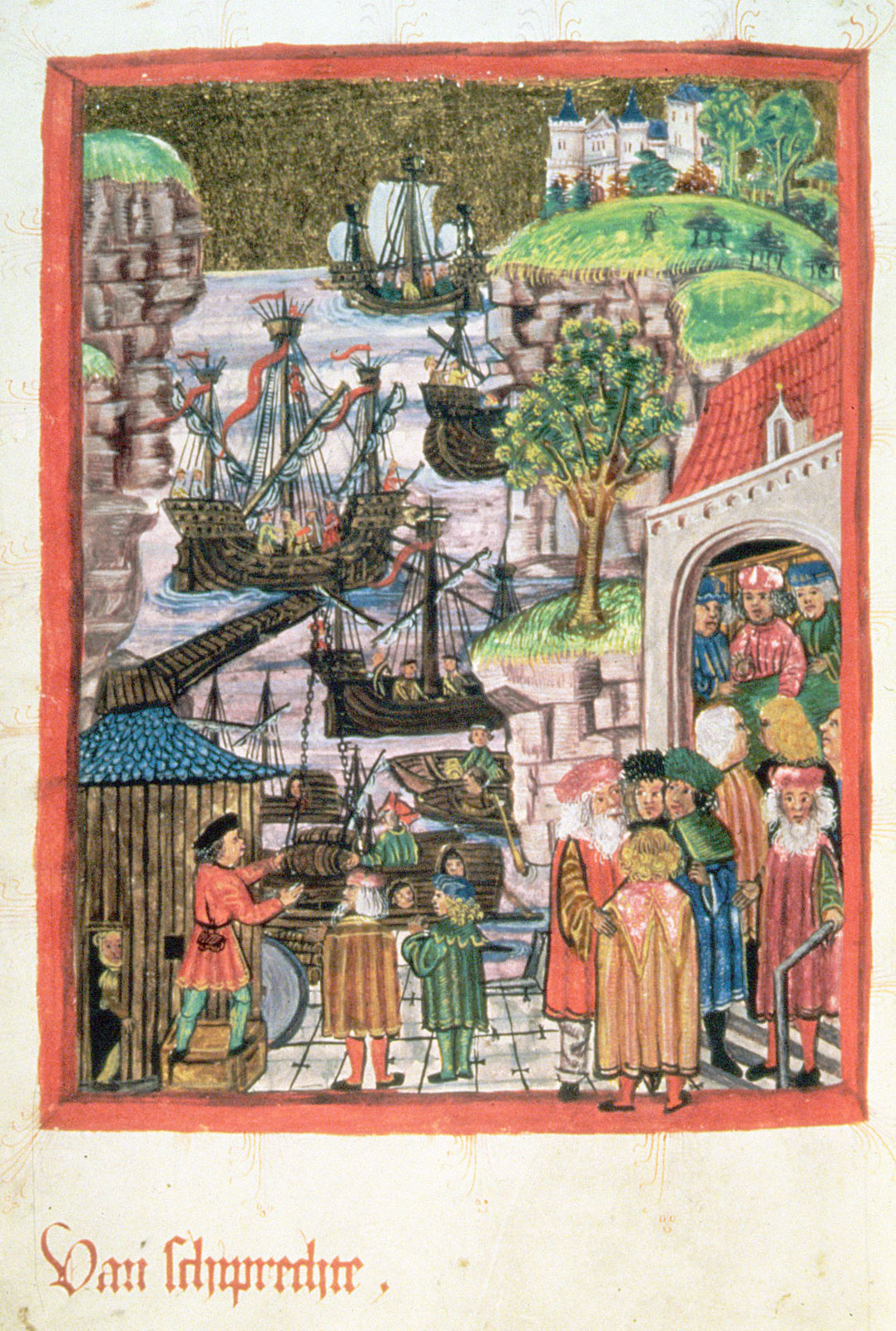
Hanseatic League's formation in Hamburg, Germany (circa 1241)

The Hanseatic League was a commercial and defensive alliance of the merchant guilds of towns and cities in northern and central Europe that established and maintained a trade monopoly over the Baltic Sea and most of Northern Europe between the 13th and 17th centuries. Although trading alliances in the region were forming as early as 1157, the town of Lübeck did not form an alliance with Hamburg (which controlled access to salt routes from Lüneburg) until 1241.

Trade was carried on chiefly by sea in order to escape tolls and political barriers, and at the end of the 15th century the Hanseatic League controlled some 60,000 tons of shipping. Although compasses were commonly being used in the Mediterranean during this period, the captains of Hanseatic vessels seemed slow to adopt the new technology, which put them in greater danger of wrecking. They also had to deal with pirates. During its zenith the alliance maintained trading posts and kontors (depots) in many cities from London and Edinburgh in the west to Novgorod in the east and Bergen in Norway.

The League's power declined after 1450 due to a number of factors, such as the 15th-century crisis, the territorial lords' shifting policies towards greater commercial control, the silver crisis and the disappearance of the great herring shoals in the Baltic. During the late 16th century and early 17th century, the League fell apart, as it was unable to deal with its own internal struggles, the rise of Swedish, Dutch and English merchants, and the social and political changes that accompanied the Reformation. Although a tight-fisted monopoly, the League's need for more cargo space led to new designs in shipbuilding, and its free association of about 160 towns and villages was a historically unique economic alliance that showed the benefits of well-regulated commerce.

== Republic of Venice ==
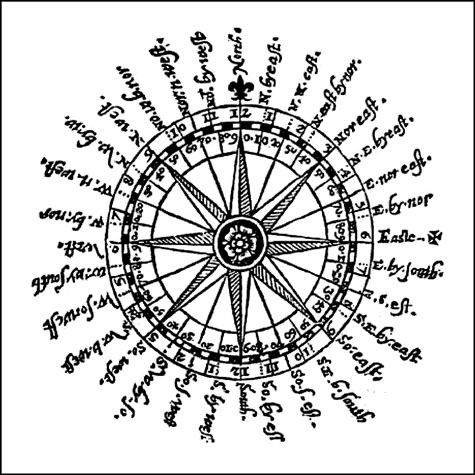
Navigational mariner's compass.

Around 1300, Venice began to develop the great galley of commerce, the ‘’galea grossa’’. It grew to carry a crew of more than 200 and weighed as much as 250 tons. These galleys took passengers and goods to Constantinople (now Istanbul), and to Alexandria in Egypt, and returned to Venice carrying luxury items. A sea route to the Indies discovered by Portugal signaled an end to the glory days of Venice's merchant galleys and spice trade, but the war galleys (or fighting galleys) lived on. The war galleys were mostly manned by prisoners of war or convicts, who were chained to benches, usually three to six per oar.

More than 3,000 Venetian merchant ships were in operation by the year 1450. The trading empire of the Republic of Venice lasted longer than any other in history, and even merchants vessels were required to carry weapons and passengers were expected to be armed and ready to fight. From the beginning of the 13th century until the end of the 18th century, the Republic ruled the Adriatic, the Aegean and the Black Seas. The Republic of Genoa was Venice's main rival, and many wars were fought between them. In 1298 the Genoese destroyed the Venetian fleet at Curzola, but were themselves defeated in 1354 at Sapienza in Greece.

== The European Age of Exploration (1400–1600) ==
The Age of Exploration began with the Portuguese navigators, where Prince Henry the Navigator started a maritime school in Portugal, eventually leading to new shipbuilding technologies including the caravel, the carrack and the galleon. The Portuguese Empire led the Portuguese Kingdom to explore and map more of the globe. After voyages down the west coast of Africa, Bartolomeu Dias rounded the Cape of Good Hope. In a subsequent voyage, Vasco da Gama rounded the Cape and sailed across the open water of the Indian Ocean to reach the Indian subcontinent. It was the first time in history that humans had navigated from Europe around Africa to Asia. The Fra Mauro map suggests that ships from India had crossed the Cape of Good Hope in 1420. It led to the discovery of Brazil and South America, and the first circumnavigation around the world, with the Portuguese nobleman Ferdinand Magellan, sailing around the world, across the entire Pacific Ocean for the first time.

At the beginning of the 16th century, sea clashes in the Indian Ocean as the decisive Battle of Diu, in 1509, marked a turning point in history: the shift from the Mediterranean and from the relatively isolated seas, disputed in antiquity and in the Middle Ages, to the oceans and to the European hegemony on a global scale.

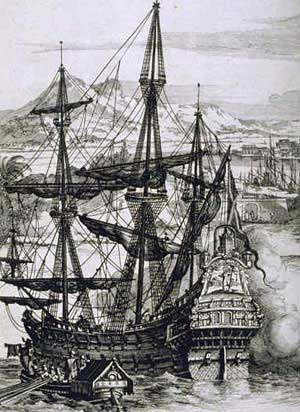
A Spanish galleon

Christopher Columbus set sail in Santa Maria on what is probably history's most well known voyage of discovery on August 3, 1492. Leaving from the town of Palos, in southern Spain, Columbus headed west. After a brief stop in the Canary Islands for provisions and repairs, he set out for Asia. He reached San Salvador first, it is believed, (easternmost of the Bahamas) in October, and then sailed past Cuba and Hispaniola, still searching for Asia. He returned home in 1493 to a hero's welcome, and within six months had 1,500 men and 17 vessels at his command.

The year 1571 saw the last great battle between galleys, when more than 400 Turkish and Christian vessels engaged each other on the Gulf of Patras. The Battle of Lepanto as it was called, saw some 38,000 men perish. Miguel de Cervantes, author of Don Quixote, was wounded during the battle. In April 1587, Sir Francis Drake burned 37 Spanish ships in the harbor at Cádiz, in southern Spain.

The publication of Jan Huygen van Linschoten's book Voyages provided a significant turning point in Europe's maritime history. Before the publication of this book, knowledge of the sea route to the Far East had been well guarded by the Portuguese for over a century. Voyages was published in several languages, including English and German (published in 1598), Latin (1599), and French (1610). Widely read by Europeans, the original Dutch edition and the French translation had second editions published.

Once knowledge of the sea route was known to Europeans of other nations, more ships headed to East Asia. A Dutch fleet embarked on a voyage to India using Linschoten's charts in 1595. (The Dutch version of his book was published in 1596, but his sea charts had been published the previous year). The publication of the nautical maps enabled the Dutch and British East India companies to break the trade monopoly Portugal held with the East Indies. Protestant Europe was ushered into the age of exploration in large part thanks to his work.

== European innovations ==
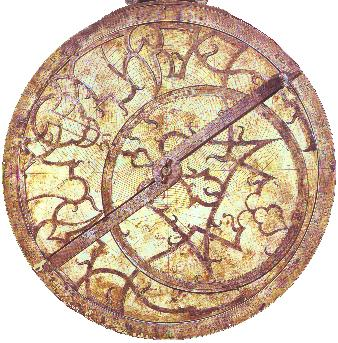
Astrolabe, used for navigation until around 1730, when they were replaced with sextants

From the sixth to the eighteenth centuries, the maritime history of Europe had a profound impact on the rest of the world. The broadside-cannoned full-rigged sixteenth-century sailing ship provided the continent with a weapon to dominate the world.

During this time period, Europeans made remarkable inroads in maritime innovations. These innovations enabled them to expand overseas and set up colonies, most notably during the sixteenth and seventeenth centuries.

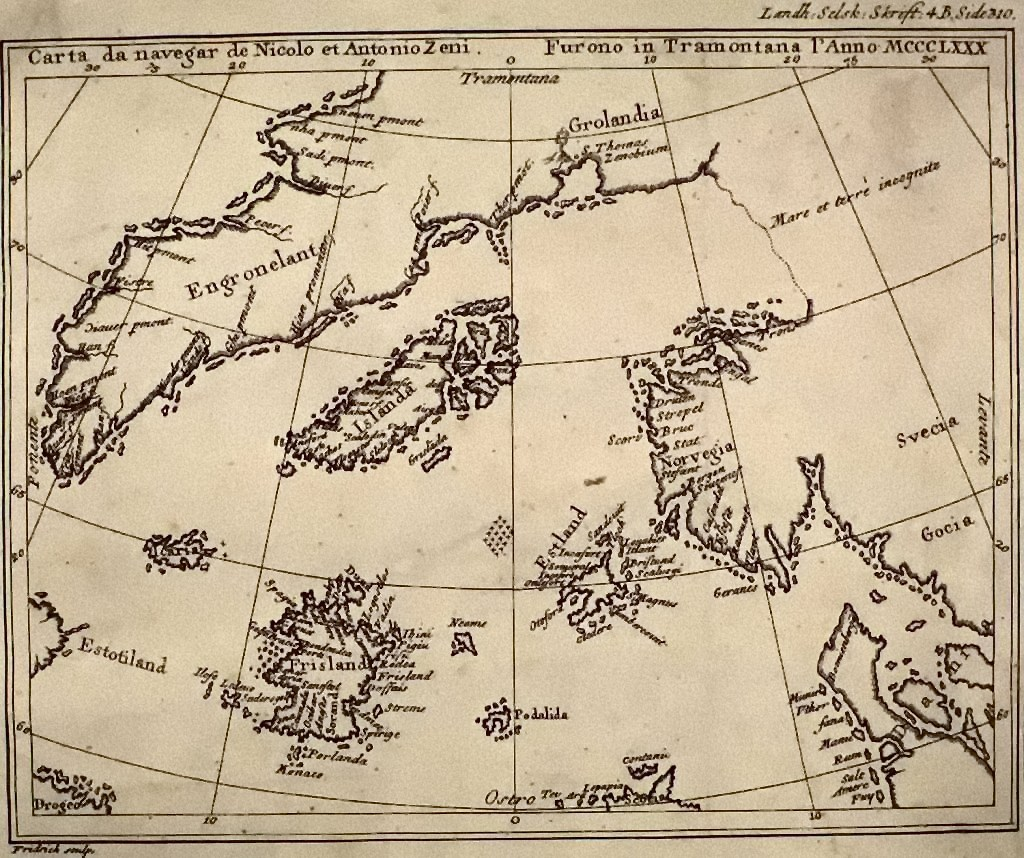
1588 map of Northern Europe by Nicolo Zeno

They developed new sail arrangements for ships, skeleton-based shipbuilding, the Western “galea” (at the end of the 11th century), sophisticated navigational instruments, and detailed charts. After Isaac Newton published the Principia, navigation was transformed. Starting in 1670, the entire world was measured using essentially modern latitude instruments and the best available clocks. In 1730 the sextant was invented and navigators rapidly replaced their astrolabes.

== Barbary pirates ==
For several centuries, from about the time of the Crusades until the early 19th century, the Barbary pirates of northern Africa preyed on ships in the western Mediterranean Sea. In 1816, the Royal Navy, with assistance from the Dutch, destroyed the Barbary fleet in the port of Algiers. The best-known pirate of this period may have been Barbarossa, the nickname of Khair ad Din, an Ottoman-Turkish admiral and privateer who was born on the island of Lesbos, (present-day Greece), and lived from about 1475–1546.

== Siege of Gibraltar and the Battle of Trafalgar ==
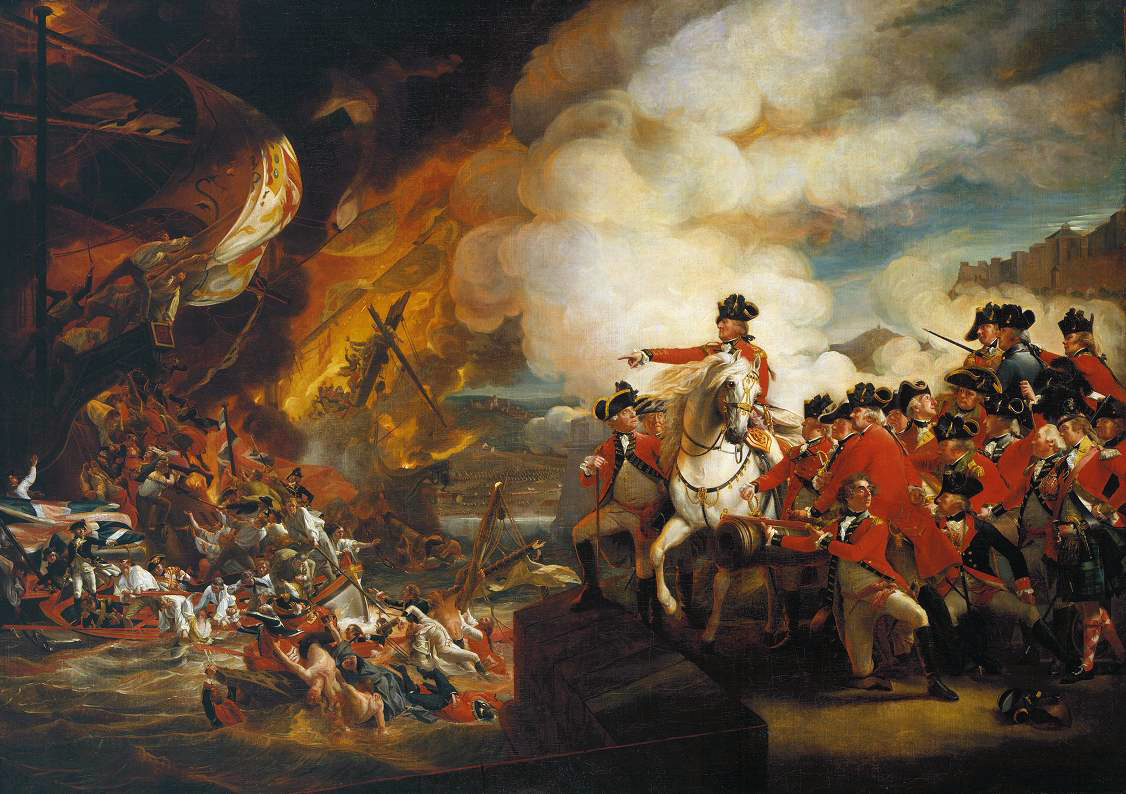
The Defeat of the Floating Batteries at Gibraltar, September 1782. By John Singleton Copley (1738-1815)

July 1779 saw the start of the Great Siege of Gibraltar, an attempt by France and Spain to recover control of stolen Gibraltar from the British. The garrison survived all attacks, including an assault on September 13, 1782, that included 48 ships and 450 cannon. In October 1805, the Battle of Trafalgar took place, which involved 60 vessels, 27 British, and 33 French and Spanish. The British did not lose a single ship, and destroyed the enemy fleet, but Admiral Lord Nelson died in the battle. It was the most significant naval battle of the beginning of the 19th century, and confirmed the British Navy's supremacy of the time.

== Lighthouses ==
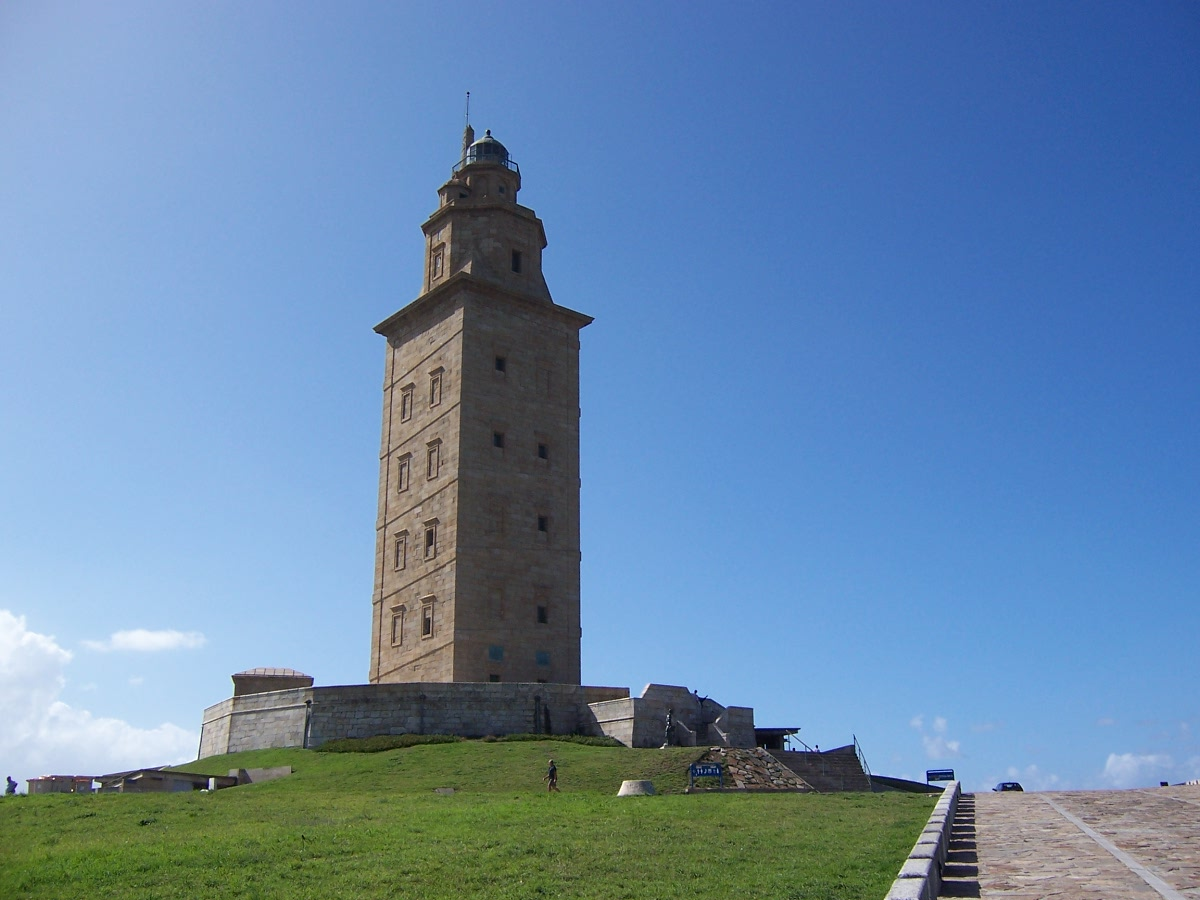
Tower of Hercules

The Pharos of Meloria is often considered the first lighthouse in Europe since Roman times. Meloria, a rocky islet off the Tuscan coast in the Tyrrhenian Sea, was the location of two medieval naval battles. The Tower of Hercules (Torre de Hércules), in northwestern Spain, is almost 1,900 years old. The ancient Roman lighthouse stands near A Coruña, Galicia, and is 57 metres (185 ft) in height. It is the oldest working Roman lighthouse in the world.

According to Smithsonian, a lighthouse on the Gironde River in France, Cardovan Tower, was the first lighthouse to use a Fresnel lens in 1822. The light reportedly could be seen from more than 20 miles (32 km) at sea.

== Contemporary era ==
=== Oil spills ===
There have been several large oil spills off the coasts of Europe since 1967. They include:

- Aegean Sea — A Coruña, Spain, December 3, 1992
- Amoco Cadiz — Brittany, France, March 16, 1978
- Braer — Shetland Islands, January 5, 1993
- Othello — Trälhavet Bay, Sweden, March 20, 1970
- Prestige — Galicia, Spain, November 13, 2002
- Torrey Canyon — Cornwall, England, March 18, 1967
- West Cork oil spill — 80 kilometres (50 mi) south of Fastnet Rock, Ireland, February 16, 2009

== See also ==
- History of Europe
- Maritime history
- Naval warfare
- Timeline of maritime migration and exploration
- Age of Discovery
- Maritime republics
- Timeline of European exploration
