= Lanton =

Lanton may refer to:

- Lanton, Gironde, France
- Lanton, Missouri, United States
- Lanton, Northumberland, England
- Lanton, Scottish Borders, Scotland
- a trade name of the drug Lansoprazole
