= Flora-class frigate =

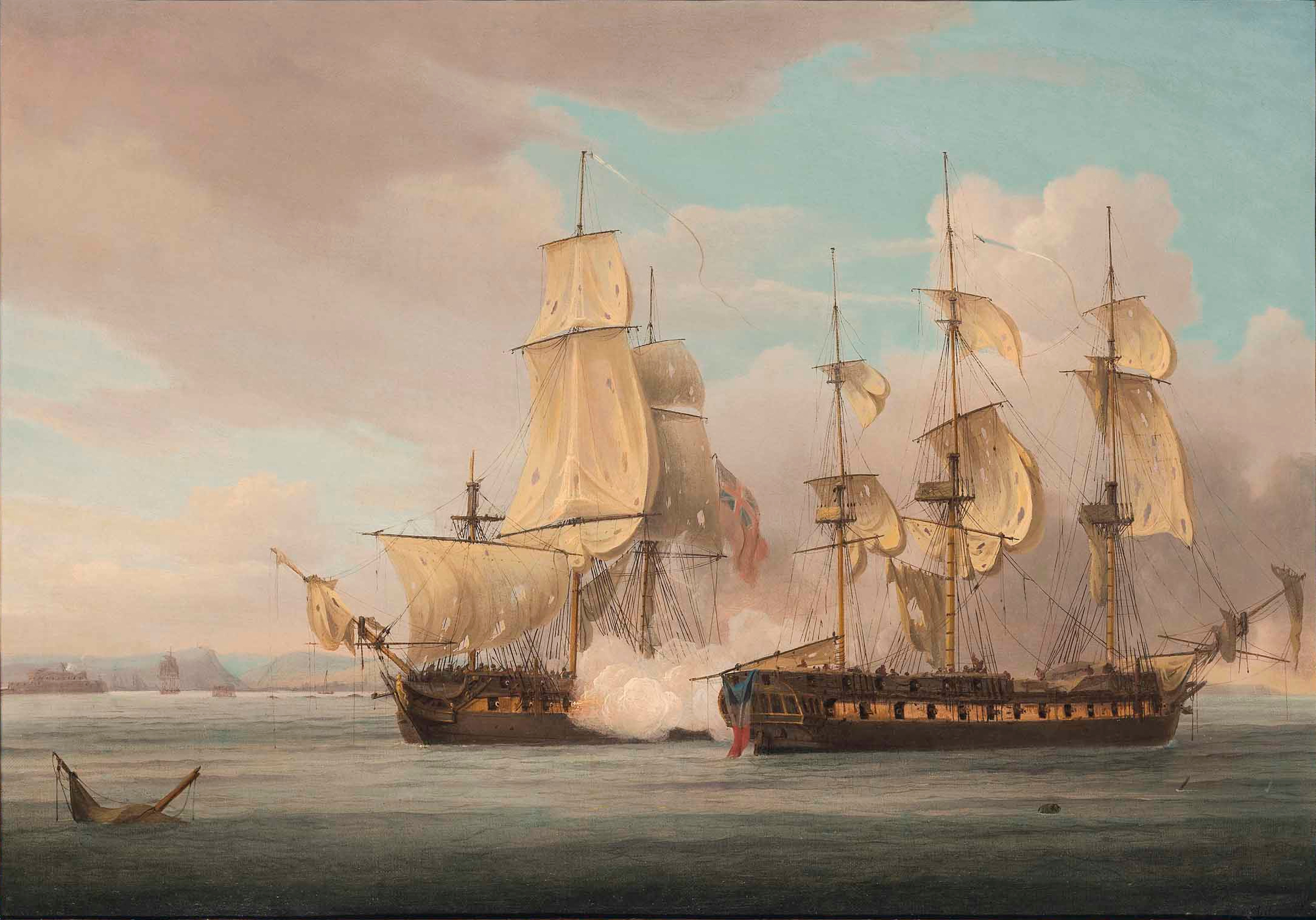
- A Flora-class frigate, HMS Crescent, capturing the French frigate Réunion off Cherbourg, 20 October 1793

Class overview
- Name: Flora class
- Built: 1778–1781
- In commission: 1780–1813
- Completed: 4

General characteristics
- Type: Frigate
- Tons burthen: 868 53/94 (as designed)
- Length: 137 ft (42 m)
- Beam: 38 ft 0 in (12 m)
- Depth of hold: 13 ft (3.962 m)
- Sail plan: Full-rigged ship
- Complement: 260 - 270
- Armament: 36 guns comprising: Upperdeck: 26 × 18-pounder guns; Quarterdeck: 4 × 6-pounder guns; Forecastle: 2 × 6-pounder guns

The Flora-class frigates were 36-gun sailing frigates of the fifth rate produced for the Royal Navy. They were designed in 1778 by Sir John Williams in response to an Admiralty decision to discontinue 32-gun, 12-pounder (5.4 kg), vessels. Williams proposed a frigate with a main battery of twenty-six 18-pound (8.2 kg) guns and a secondary armament of ten 6 pounders (2.7 kg). Four 18-pounder carronades and 12 swivel guns were added to the upperworks in September 1799 and the 6-pound long guns were upgraded to 9-pounders in April 1780, before any of the ships were completed.

The drafted vessel had a 137 ft (42 m) gundeck, she was 113 ft (34.4 m) at the keel, with a 38 ft (12 m) beam, and a depth in the hold of 13 ft (3.962 m); she was 868 53/94 tons burthen. Initially intended for a crew of 260 this was increased to 270 when the secondary armament was boosted on 25 April 1780.

The first of the class, HMS Flora was ordered on 6 November 1778. The second ship, ordered on 19 December 1780, had the position of its hawseholes changed to just above the cheeks. This design modification carried over to the last two ships, requested between August and December 1781, which also had their lines slightly altered.

Flora-class frigates served in the American Revolutionary War, French Revolutionary War and Napoleonic Wars. The last to be built, HMS Romulus was ordered in December 1781 by which time, Williams' Latona-class frigate was in service, a 38-gun 18-pounder built to compete with Edward Hunt's Minerva-class.

== Ships in class ==
- Flora
  - Ordered: 6 November 1778
  - Built by: Adam Hayes, Deptford Dockyard.
  - Keel laid: 21 November 1778
  - Launched: 6 May 1780
  - Completed: 23 June 1780 at the builder's shipyard.
  - Fate: Wrecked off the Dutch coast on 18 January 1808.
- Thalia
  - Ordered: 19 December 1780
  - Built by: John Nowlan & Thomas Calhoun, Bursledon.
  - Keel laid: March 1781
  - Launched: 7 November 1782
  - Completed: 18 January 1783 at Portsmouth.
  - Fate: Broken up at Chatham in July 1784.
- Crescent
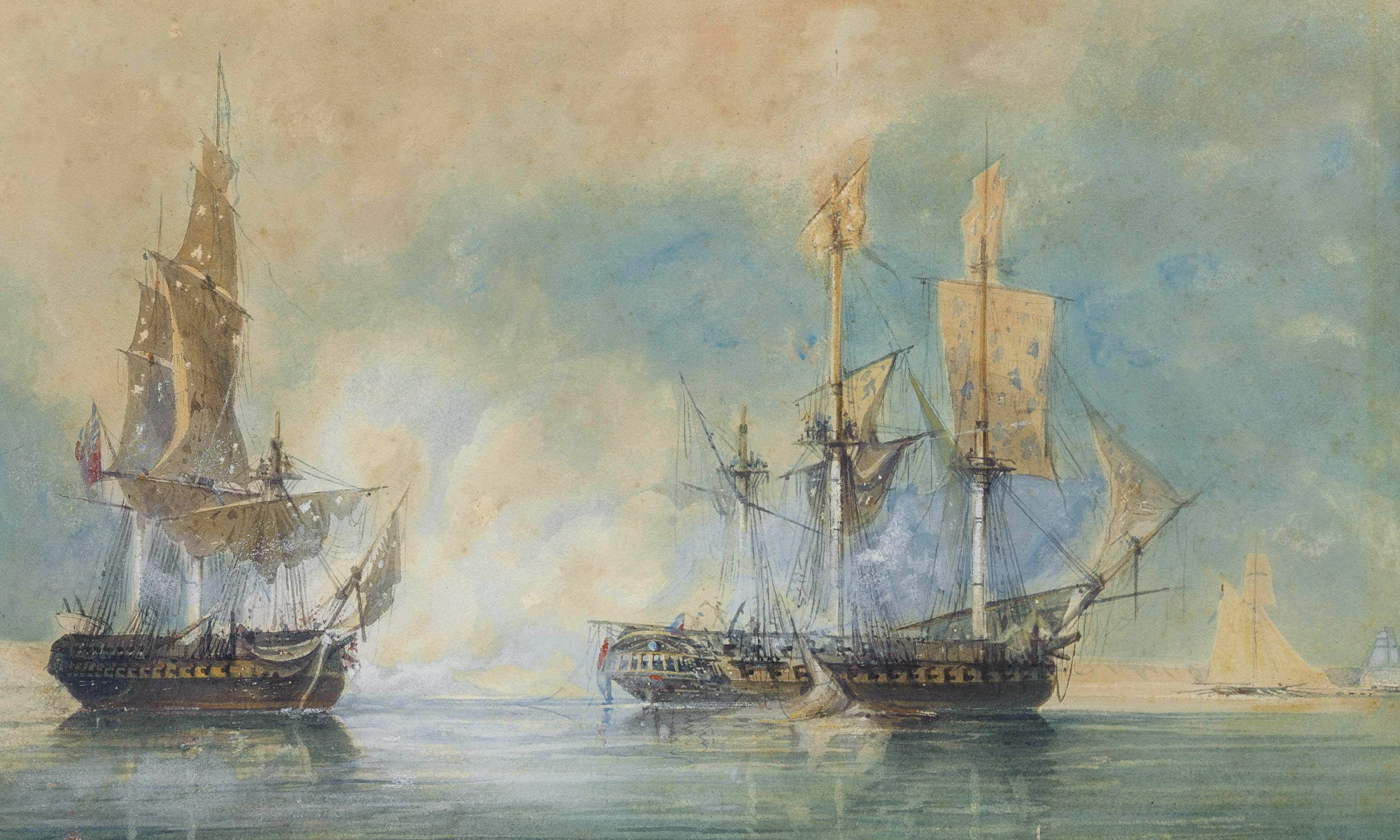
  HMS Crescent battles the French frigate Réunion in October 1793
  - Ordered: 11 August 1781
  - Built by: John Nowlan & Thomas Calhoun, Bursledon.
  - Keel laid: November 1781
  - Launched: 28 October 1784
  - Completed: 11 January 1785 at Portsmouth.
  - Fate: Wrecked off Jutland on 6 December 1808.
- Romulus
  - Ordered: 28 December 1781
  - Built by: Edward Greaves & Mr Purnell, Limehouse.
  - Keel laid: November 1782
  - Launched: 21 September 1785
  - Completed: 5 July 1790 at Portsmouth.
  - Fate: Broken up in Bermuda in November 1816.
