= Swarland Old Hall =

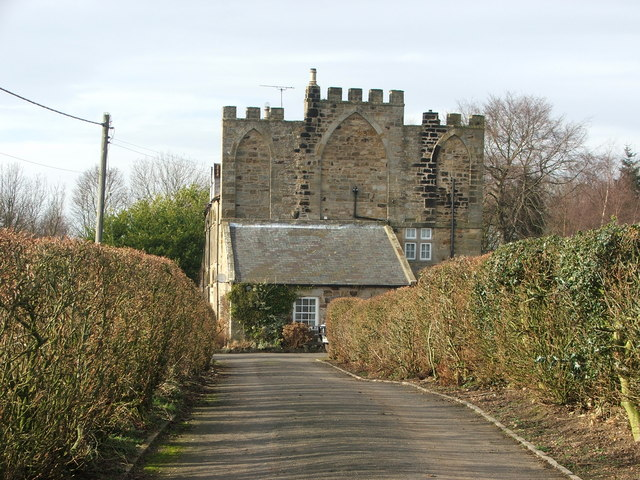
- Swarland Old Hall

- Location in Northumberland

General information
- Location: Northumberland, England
- Coordinates: 55.327°N 1.743°W
- OS grid: NU163036

Swarland Old Hall is a small 17th-century country house at Swarland, Northumberland, England. It is a Grade II* listed building.

The Manor of Swarland was owned from before the time of the Norman Conquest by the de Haslerigg family. The house which has a four-bay south front and two storeys with attics was built in the late 17th century and incorporates fabric of earlier properties. The east front is notable for its castellated full height screen wall with three blind Gothic arches.

A railed monument nearby (Grade II listed) records the death of William Haslerigg in 1681. His brother and heir was High Sheriff of Northumberland in 1698.

The estate was acquired by Richard Grieve in 1741. His son Davison Richard Grieve (High Sheriff of Northumberland in 1788) engaged architect John Carr to build a new mansion (Swarland Hall) nearby. The new house, later the home of Alexander Davison was demolished in the 1930s.

The old hall passed through many owners. It is currently offered by its present owners as self-catering holiday accommodation.

== History ==
According to the historian Eneas Mackenzie Swarland Old Hall was built in 1640. This is supported by Presbyterian Church history which states that Nonconformist congregation meetings had been held at Swarland Old Hall since 1640. At this time the owner and possible originator of the Hall was William Heselrigg (died 1662). The Heselrigg family had owned the Swarland estate for centuries and William had inherited it from his father in 1638 so it is possible that he built the Hall soon after this, His eldest son and heir William Heselrigg who died in 1681 is buried in a nearby field. He married twice but had no children so when he died the Hall was inherited by his brother Robert Heselrigg. He did not marry so when he died in 1716 the property was inherited by a relative Sir Robert Heselrigg 6th Baronet.

Sir Robert Heselrigg (1668-1721) also owned Nosely Hall in Leicestershire. After his death in 1721 his son Sir Arthur Heselrigg (1708-1763) became the owner of the Swarland Old Hall. He sold it in 1735 to Richard Grieve of Alnwick.

Richard Grieve (1681-1765) was an attorney and a wealthy property owner. He married Elizabeth Davidson and had two sons. His eldest son Davidson Richard Grieve (1740-1793) inherited his Swarland estate when he died in 1765 and immediately erected a new house called Swarland Park which is north of the Old Hall. He was married but had no children and when he died in 1793 the estate was sold to Alexander Davison in 1795.

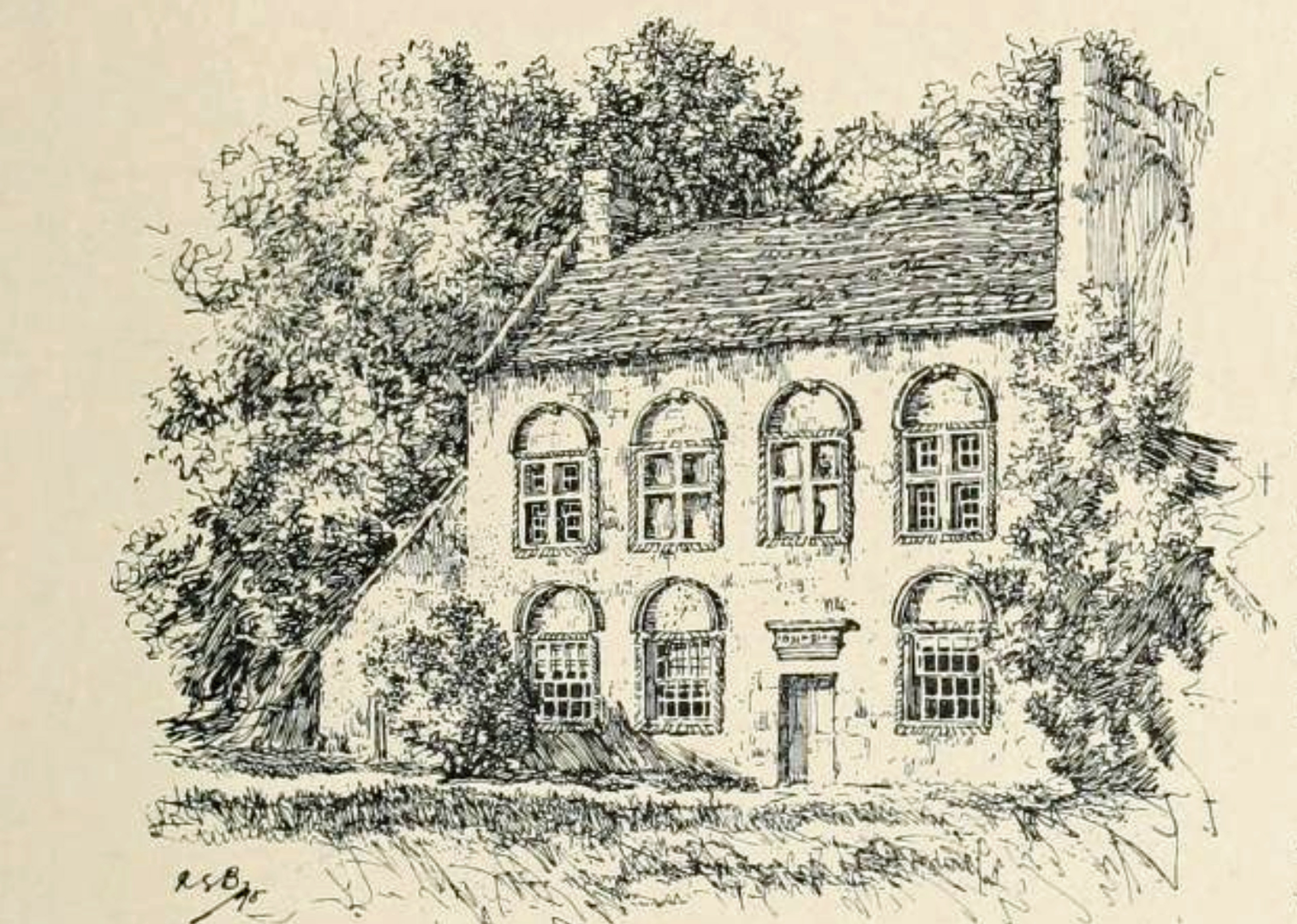
Drawing of Swarland Old Hall in 1893.

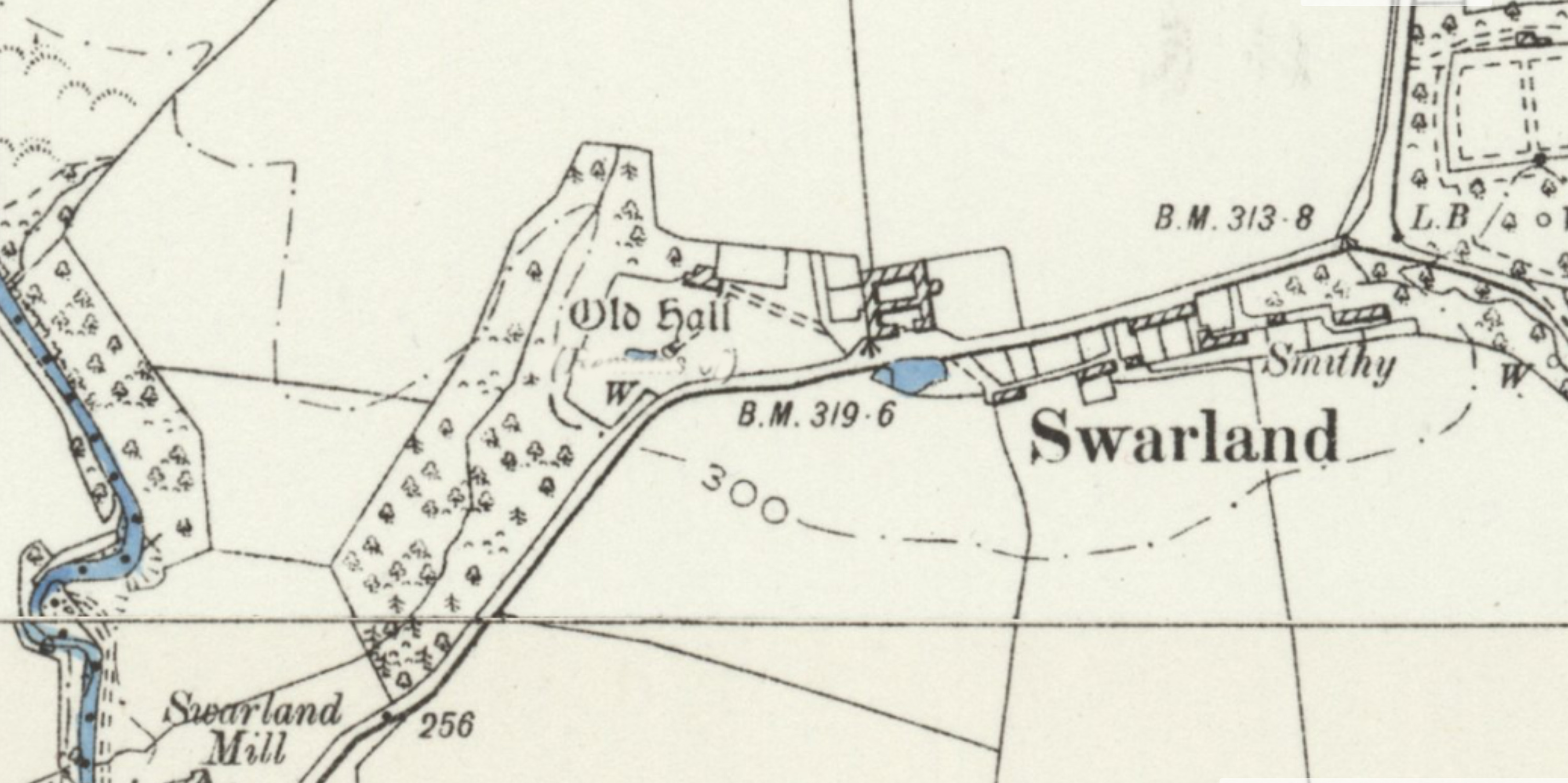
Map Swarland Old Hall, 1897

Alexander Davison (1750-1829) was a wealthy merchant and also personal friend of Horatio Nelson so when Nelson died he erected a memorial near Swarland Park. When he died in 1829 his eldest son Hugh Percy Davison (1788-1849) became the owner of the estate. When he died in 1849 because he had no male heirs his twin brother Sir William Davison (1788-1873) became the owner. After his death the whole estate was put on the market in 1874. It was bought by John Gifford Riddell of Felton Park. He sold Swarland Park with 484 acres to Hugh Andrews some time later but kept the rest of the estate which included Swarland Old Hall.

John Gifford Riddell (1830-1901) at this time owned the Felton Park Estate which had been in the Riddell family for over two centuries. Swarland Old Hall now became part of this Estate for the next seventy years. The drawing of Swarland Old Hall shown was made in 1893 when Robert Yeaman was the tenant farmer with his wife Mary. In 1940 Jane Isabella Aynsley (1882-1960) the widow of Lionel Aynsley (1877-1934) of Rothbury bought the property. When she died in 1960 the Hall was occupied by her son Arthur Lionel Aynsley (1912-1988). When he died in 1988 the Hall was put on the market for sale.
