= HMS Romulus (1785) =

Frigate of the Royal Navy

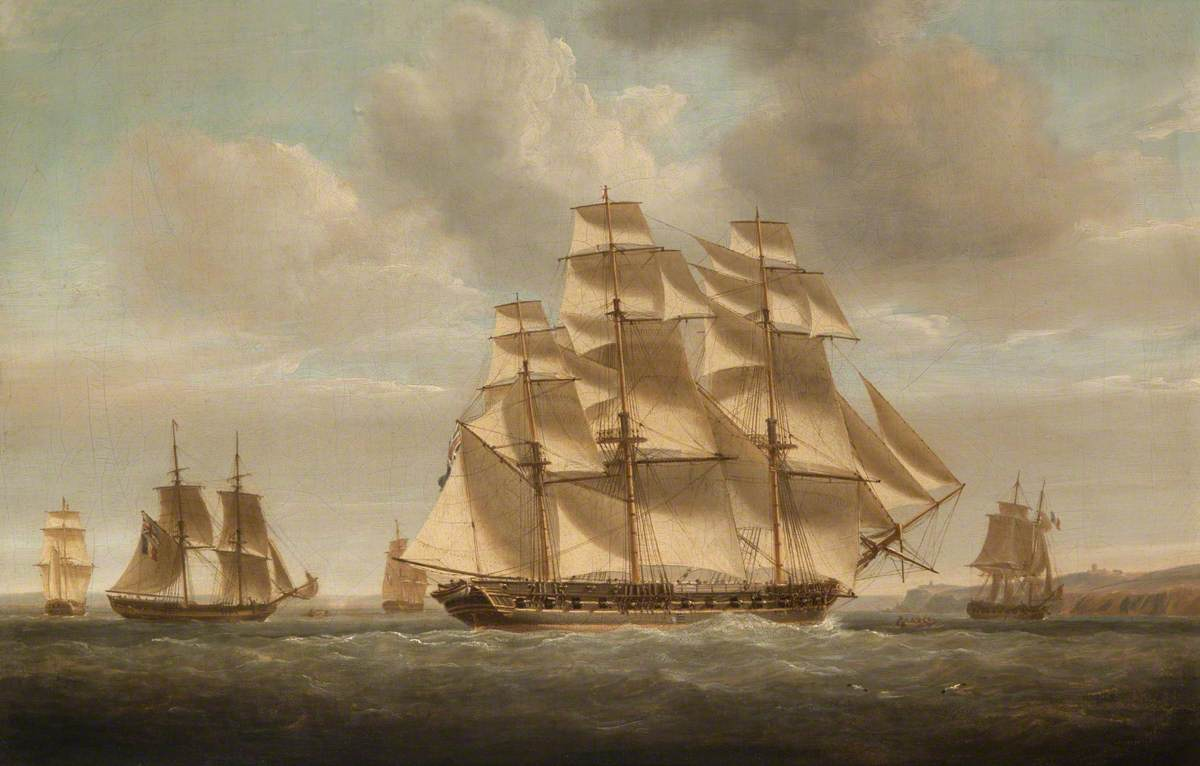
- Romulus in full sail, c. 1806

History

Great Britain
- Name: HMS Romulus
- Ordered: 28 December 1781
- Builder: Greaves and Purnell, Limehouse
- Laid down: November 1782
- Launched: 21 September 1785
- Commissioned: May 1790
- Fate: Broken up, 1816

General characteristics
- Class & type: Flora-class fifth-rate frigate
- Tons burthen: 87937/94 (bm)
- Length: 137 ft 2 in (41.8 m) (gun deck); 113 ft (34.4 m) (keel)
- Beam: 38 ft 3 in (11.7 m)
- Draught: 9 ft 5 1/2 in (2.9 m) (bow); 13 ft 6 1/2 in (4.1 m) (stern)
- Depth of hold: 13 ft 3 1/2 in (4.1 m)
- Propulsion: Sails
- Sail plan: Full-rigged ship
- Complement: 270
- Armament: 36 guns: Gun deck: 26 × 18-pdrs; Quarterdeck: 8 × 9-pdrs + 4 × 18-pdr carronades; Forecastle: 2 × 9-pdrs + 4 × 18-pdr carronades; 12 × 1/2 pdr swivel guns

HMS Romulus was a 36-gun fifth rate frigate of the Flora class, built for the Royal Navy and launched in September 1785. At the outbreak of the French Revolutionary War, Romulus was despatched to the Mediterranean where she joined a fleet under Admiral Lord Hood, initially blockading, and later occupying, the port of Toulon. She played an active role during the withdrawal in December, providing covering fire while HMS Robust and HMS Leviathan removed allied troops from the waterfront.

With three other frigates and 13 ships-of-the-line, Romulus chased a smaller French squadron into Gourjean Bay in August 1794. Kept away by the batteries on the shore, Hood returned to Corsica with four ships, leaving Romulus, three other frigates and nine ships-of-the-line, to form a blockade. This ultimately failed due to bad weather and the French ships escaped. Following the Battle of Genoa on 14 March 1795, boats from Romulus assisted in the recovery of stores and crew from HMS Illustrious, which had been badly damaged during the action and subsequent storm.

In January 1797, Romulus was in the small squadron, under Commodore Horatio Nelson that evacuated the island of Elba. While the escaping convoy was escorted to Gibraltar, Romulus, with Nelson's ship HMS Minerve, carried out a surveillance of the enemy ports and coast. On 24 May, in a ruse de guerre, Romulus captured a Spanish 20-gun corvette. Approaching under false colours with a second British frigate, the Spanish vessel was taken without a shot being fired.

Romulus was converted to a troopship in mid-1799 and served in the Egyptian campaign, landing troops for the battle of Aboukir on 8 March 1801. She was paid off at the end of the war in 1802. When hostilities resumed in May 1803, Romulus was converted into a floating battery, standing guard first at Woolwich, then Hollesley Bay near East Anglia and finally Leith. During the later half of 1810, Romulus was converted to a troopship once more and in 1812 was back in the Mediterranean. In July 1813 she had a short-lived appointment as a hospital ship in Bermuda. She paid off that December, was recommissioned a final time, and was eventually broken up on the island in November 1816.

== Construction and armament ==
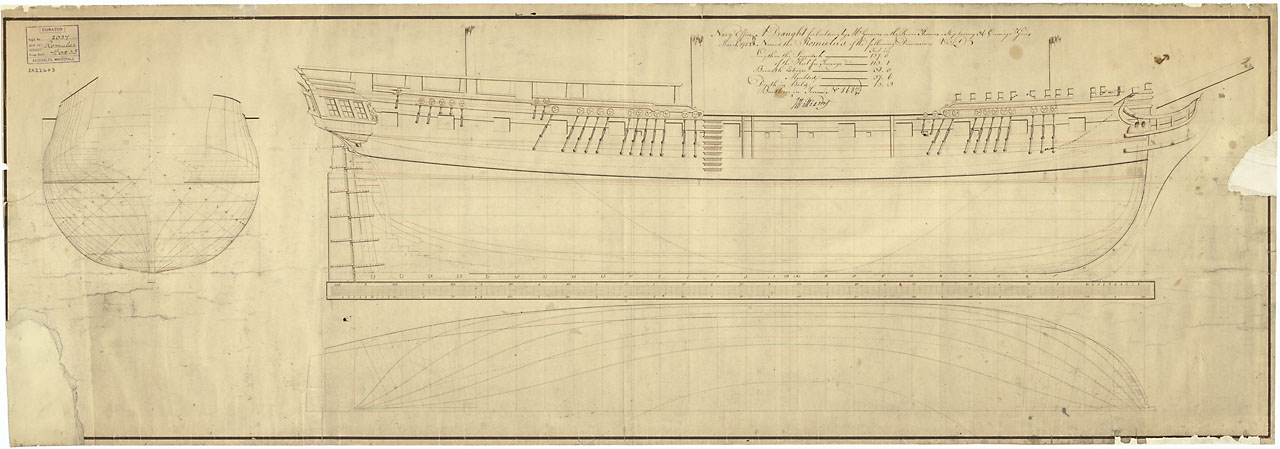
Williams' original profile plan of Romulus

Romulus was a 36-gun, Flora-class frigate built to Surveyor of the Navy Sir John Williams' design and ordered on 28 December 1781. (Note: The gun-rating of a vessel was the number of long guns it was designed to carry and did not always match its actual armament. Before 1817, carronades were not counted at all unless they were direct replacements for long guns.) Her keel, of 113 feet (34.4 m) was laid down at Limehouse in November 1782 by shipwright company Greaves and Purnell. The build cost £11,154 5/4d.

Romulus was 137 feet 2 inches (41.8 m) along the gun deck, had a beam of 38 feet 3 inches (11.7 m) and a depth in hold of 13 feet 3 1/2 inches (4.1 m). She was 87937/94 tons burthen and drew between 9 feet 5 1/2 inches (2.9 metres) at the bow and 13 feet 6 1/2 inches (4.1 metres) at the stern. When fully manned, she would carry a complement of 270.

Launched on 21 September 1785, Romulus was taken down the Thames to Deptford Dockyard, where work began on 11 October to have her sheathed in copper and rigged for sailing to Portsmouth. The works cost £1,736. With a further £2,333 spent finishing the fitting-out at Portsmouth, Romulus had cost the Admiralty £15,345 5/4d.

Flora-class frigates were designed in an attempt to counter the threat of the heavier frigates being built by the other great naval powers of the time. They were originally constructed to carry a main battery of twenty-six 18-pounder (8.2 kg) guns on the upper deck, with a secondary armament of eight 6-pounder (2.7 kg) guns on the quarterdeck and two on the forecastle. By the time Romulus was ordered however, the armament had twice been increased with the addition of eight 18-pounder carronades and twelve 1/2-pounder (0.23 kg) swivel guns in September 1799 and the upgrading of the 6-pound long guns with 9-pounders in April 1780.

== Service ==
First commissioned in May 1790, Romulus was under the command of Captain Thomas Lennox Frederick until she was paid off in September 1791. Following Britain's entry into the French Revolutionary War in February 1793, Romulus was recommissioned under Captain John Sutton and refitted at Portsmouth in April. On the twenty-second of that month she set sail for the Mediterranean where she joined Admiral William Hotham's squadron.

In August 1793, Romulus was blockading the port of Toulon with Admiral Lord Hood's fleet and was among the vessels that shared in the capture, on 5 August, of the Prince Royal of Sweden. Romulus took a polacca on 20 August, while in the company of the 64-gun HMS Agamemnon, the 74-gun HMS Robust and the 50-gun HMS Romney and on 28 August she took part in the occupation of Toulon, receiving a share of the prize money for the ships captured there. With the 32-gun HMS Meleager, she captured a French gunboat on 16 November and during the evacuation in December, Romulus provided covering fire while Robust and the 74-gun HMS Leviathan removed allied troops from the waterfront.

=== Corsica ===
Early in 1794 Romulus, with the 104-gun HMS Victory, 98-gun HMS St George, 90-gun HMS Princess Royal, HMS Fortitude, HMS Egmont, HMS Alcide, HMS Captain, all of 74 guns, the 40-gun HMS Imperieuse, 32-gun HMS Juno, 28-gun HMS Aurora and Meleager, supported the troops under Major-General Sir David Dundas that captured the town of San Fiorenzo in the Gulf of St Florent, Corsica. There they found the scuttled French frigate Minerve on 19 February, and were able to refloat her. She was taken into service as the 38-gun HMS St Fiorenzo. Romulus shared in the prize money for both the frigate and for the naval stores captured in the town.

The British fleet under Hood was laying off Bastia in early June 1794 when word was received that seven French ships-of-the-line and five frigates had broken out of Toulon. Setting off in pursuit, with 13 ships-of-the-line and four frigates, including Romulus, the British spotted their quarry on 10 June, and by dawn the next day had closed the distance to 12 nautical miles (22 km). Wishing to avoid conflict with a superior force, the French sought shelter in Gourjean Bay. When they arrived at the anchorage at about 14:00, the only British ship close enough to engage was the 28-gun frigate HMS Dido which was beaten off by the fire from the rearmost French vessels and the two forts guarding the entrance. A plan was formulated to capture or destroy the French fleet with Romulus, Dido, Juno, Meleager and the 74-gun HMS Illustrious, attacking the four enemy frigates. The scheme was delayed by contrary winds and tides and then cancelled after the French fortified their position by landing guns and establishing batteries on the shore.

Hood returned to Corsica, arriving at Calvi on 27 June with Victory, Princess Royal and two 74s, having left the remainder of the fleet under Hotham. The force, comprising nine ships-of-the-line and four frigates, including Romulus was supposed to blockade the bay, but was blown off station during a storm, and the French escaped back to Toulon.

=== Battle of Genoa ===
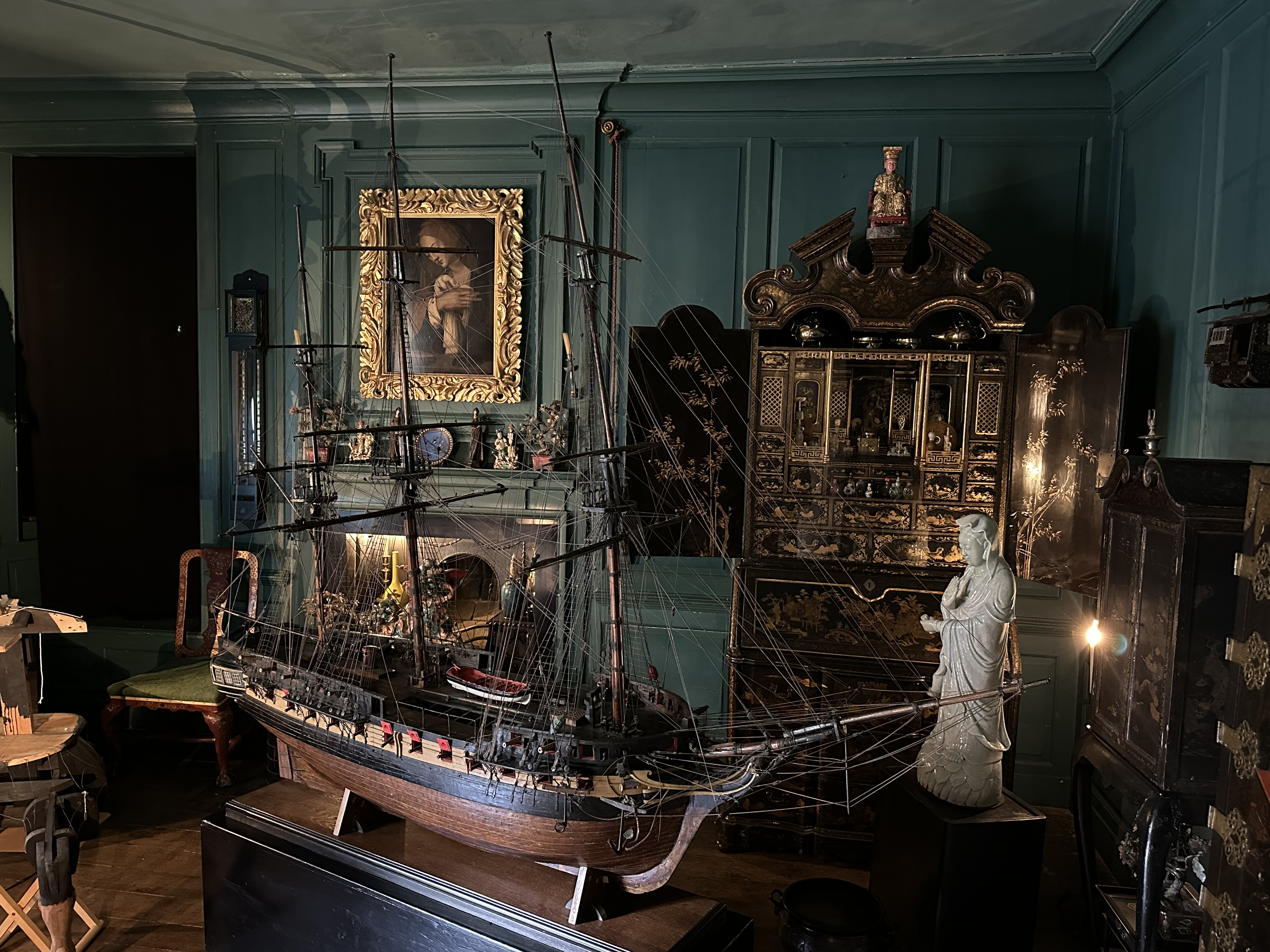
A 1:25 scale model of Romulus on display at Snowshill Manor, Gloucestershire

Later in August 1794, Captain George Hope was appointed to Romulus, and in November Hood left for England, leaving Hotham as the Commander-in-Chief. Romulus was one of seven frigates which, together with 13 ships-of-the-line, two sloops and a cutter, were anchored in the roads of Livorno on 8 March 1795. The following day, a British scout, the 24-gun sloop HMS Moselle, brought news that a French fleet of 15 ships-of-the-line, six frigates and two brigs, had been seen off the islands of Sainte-Marguerite. Hotham immediately ordered his ships to sea and on 10 March the advanced British frigates spotted the French fleet at some distance. Making their way back to Toulon against the wind, the French had with them the recently captured 74-gun HMS Berwick, which had been undergoing repairs at Corsica and was sailing under a jury rig when taken on 8 March.

The British had been in pursuit for two days when on the night of 12 March a storm developed. Two French ships of the line, Berwick and Mercure, were damaged and had to be escorted to Gourjean Bay by two frigates, leaving the opposing fleets roughly equal in strength and number. Seeing that the French were intending to avoid battle, the next morning Hotham, who had hitherto been trying to form line, ordered a general chase, and at 08:00 the 80-gun Ça Ira at the rear of the French fleet, collided with the 80-gun Victoire and its fore and main topmasts collapsed overboard. The leading British ship was the 36-gun frigate, HMS Inconstant under Captain Thomas Fremantle, which reached the damaged Ça Ira within an hour of the collision and opened fire at close range, causing further damage. Seeing the danger, the French frigate Vestale fired upon Inconstant from a distance before taking the limping Ça Ira in tow.

The chase continued throughout the day and night with the British van sporadically engaging with the French rearguard. Ça Ira dropped further and further behind the main body of the French force; to better protect the damaged ship, Vestale was replaced with a ship of the line, the 74-gun Censeur. By morning the fleets were 21 nautical miles (39 km) south-west of Genoa with the British rapidly gaining on the French. Ça Ira and Censeur had fallen a long way back from the French fleet, and Hotham sent his two fastest ships after them. Captain and the 74-gun HMS Bedford did not arrive simultaneously however, and were both repulsed, although further damage was inflicted on the French stragglers in the process. As more British ships arrived, the French fleet broke off the engagement and left Ça Ira and Censeur to their fate. Hotham was content with the capture of these prizes and made no attempt to pursue the fleeing French.

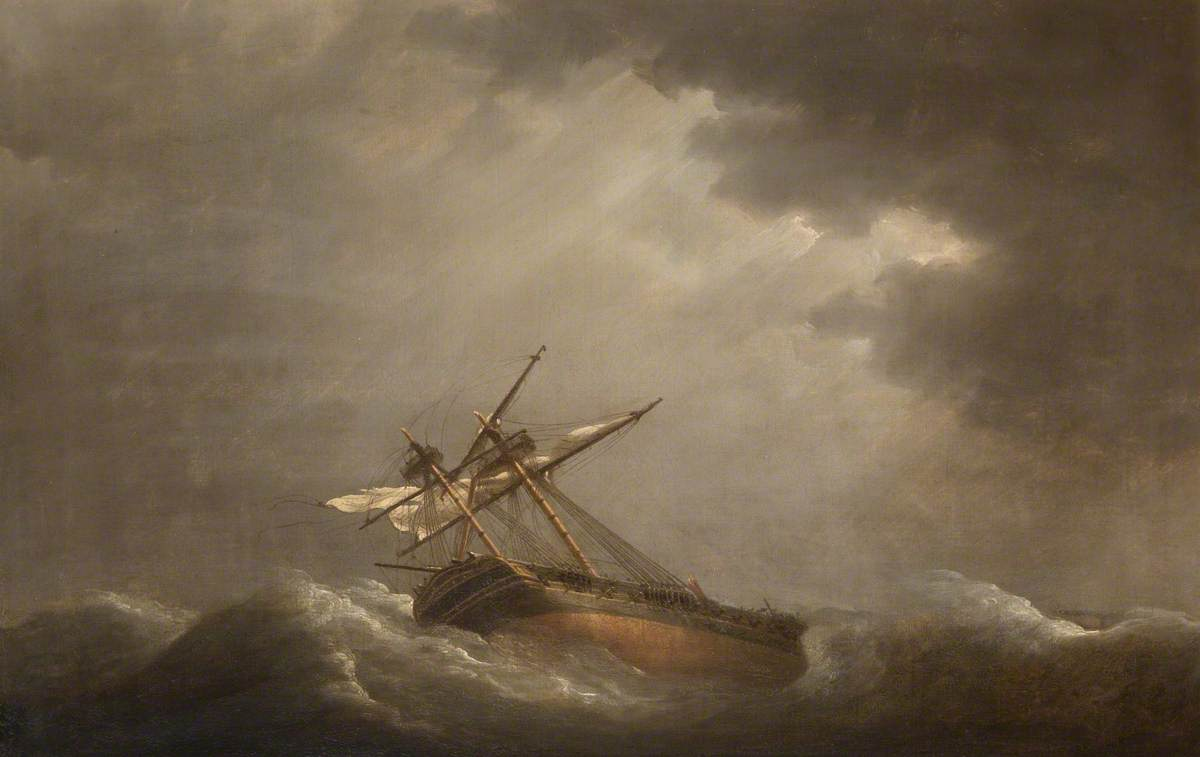
Romulus in a storm

After the action, the British fleet anchored in the Gulf of La Spezia to make repairs, but on 17 March was struck by a heavy gale. The badly damaged Illustrious, which had been taken in tow by Meleager, broke free and grounded near Avenza. On 20 March, the weather had abated sufficiently to effect a rescue. Romulus, Tarleton, Lowestoffe, and teams of ship's boats, successfully removed all of the crew and most of the ship's stores without casualties but were unable to save the irreparably damaged ship. Once the wreck had been cleared, it was set on fire and abandoned.

Following temporary repairs to the battle and storm damaged British Fleet, Romulus and her compatriots left Spezia bay on 25 March and arrived the next day at San Fiorenzo, where further work was carried out to the afflicted ships. Upon completion on 18 April, Hotham's ships, minus the two prizes, Ça Ira and Censeur, set sail for Livorno and anchored in the roads there on 27 April.

=== Escort duties and cruising ===
On 26 September 1794, in company with HMS Diadem of 64 guns, Romulus captured an enemy ship, Aballata, loaded with specie. She took another prize in January the following year, and a further vessel in July 1796. Romulus was also in sight when the 32-gun HMS Lively captured the Danish ship, Concordia on 27 February 1796, and was therefore entitled to a share of the spoils.

In January 1797, Romulus assisted in the evacuation of the island of Elba along with 40-gun HMS Minerve under Commodore Horatio Nelson, Dido and 32-gun HMS Southampton; the storeships HMS Dromedary and HMS Dolphin, and two sloops. On 29 January the squadron left Portoferraio, with 12 transports bound for Gibraltar but on that evening, Minerve and Romulus left the convoy to carry out a surveillance of the enemy ports and coast. The two frigates travelled first to Corsica, evacuated by the British in October the previous year. Finding nothing of any consequence in San Fiorenzo Bay, Nelson decided to investigate Toulon. Arriving on 1 February, two days were spent in the roads and looking into the port but there was no sign of the enemy fleet, and the few ships that were there were not in a seaworthy condition. The frigates subsequently sailed to Barcelona, where they flew French colours in the hope of tempting out any ships within. This ruse de guerre was not successful however, and with the wind being contrary for Minorca, the two British vessels sailed instead for Cartagena. Finding it empty also, Nelson surmised that the combined Spanish and French fleet had gone west and was operating outside the Mediterranean. Minerve and Romulus therefore, rejoined the rest of the squadron at Gibraltar on 10 February.

With the 36-gun HMS Mahonesa, Romulus captured the 20-gun corvette Nuestra Senora del Rosario off Cádiz on 24 May 1797. The two British ships approached under false colours and did not reveal their true identity until they were alongside; at which point the Spanish vessel struck, without a shot being fired. Romulus and Mahonesa made a further capture on 10 September when, this time with the assistance of Romulus' sister ship, the 36-gun HMS Thalia, they took the French brig, Espoir. In February 1798, Romulus sailed for England, under Captain Henry Heathcote, where she paid off.

=== Troopship ===
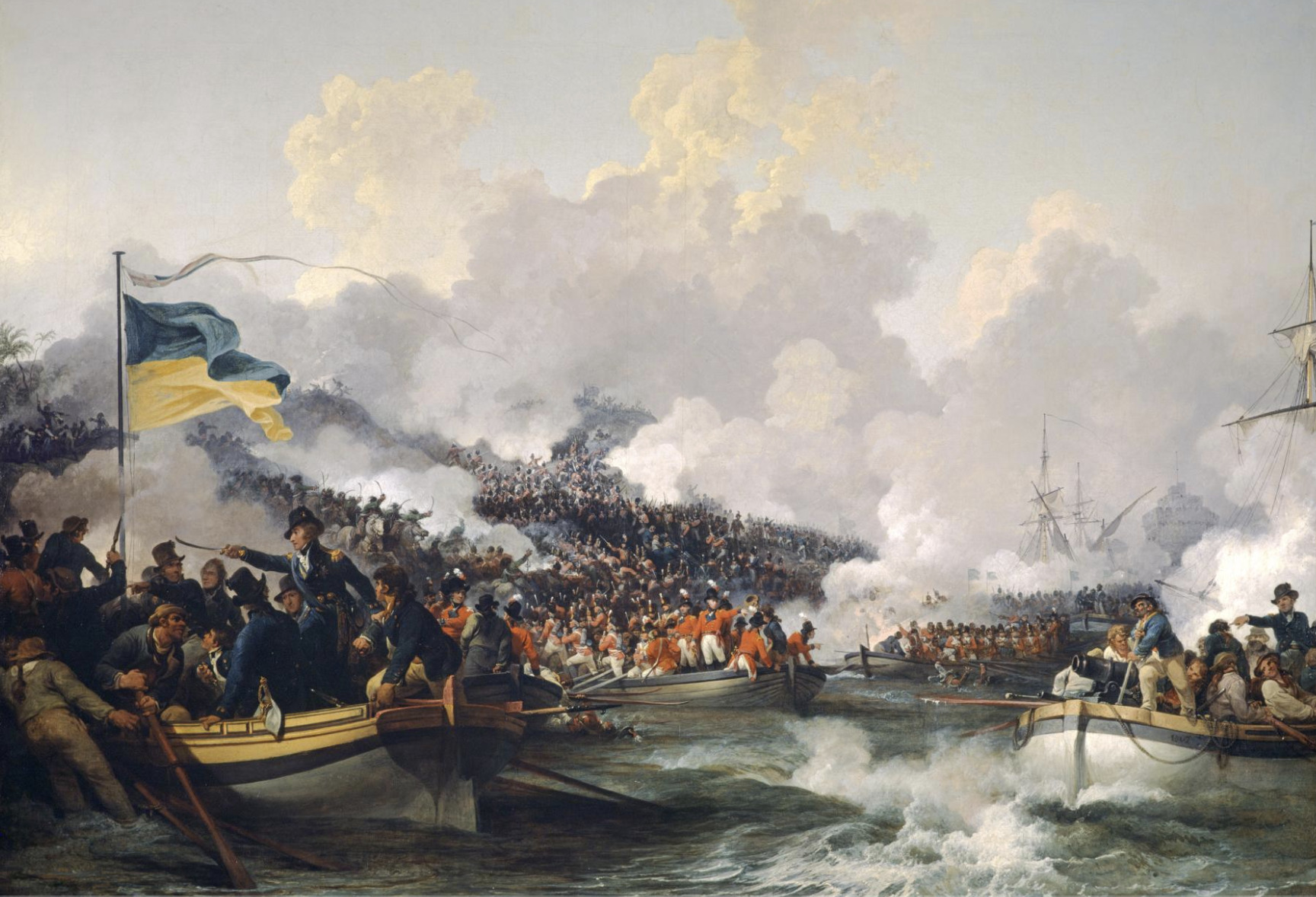
Landing troops at Aboukir Bay on 8 March 1801

During mid-1799, Romulus was recommissioned as a troopship and sent to the Mediterranean under Commander John Culverhouse. Even in this lightly armed state, she was still an effective warship, capturing a Danish brig out of Livorno on 14 June 1800. On 30 September, Romulus was in sight when a privateer took a Swedish brig, and was therefore entitled to a share of the prize money. She served in the Navy's Egyptian campaign, landing troops at Aboukir bay on 8 March 1801, where she came under fire, which killed one of her crew and wounded another. On 3 December, while Culverhouse was recovering from an illness, Lieutenant Thomas Staines was appointed to the command of Romulus to ferry the 64th Regiment of Foot from Alexandria to Malta. Romulus paid off at the end of the war in 1802.

== Later service and fate ==
In March 1803, Romulus was converted into a floating battery, with 32 18-pound long guns (Note: The Heavy Frigate (Robert Gardiner) lists Romulus' armament as 24 × 18-pound long guns and 8 × 18-pounder carronades following her conversion.) and recommissioned under Commander Woodley Losack in April. She guarded the Thames near Woolwich until June, when, hostilities with France having resumed in May, she was transferred to Hollesley Bay, off East Anglia, a popular anchorage for the Royal Navy at that time. Command passed to Commander Charles Pelly in January 1804, then Lieutenant Thomas Burton in May, when she transported troops to the mouth of the Elbe before sailing to the Firth of Forth to stand sentry at Leith.

Romulus was laid up at Chatham from 1807 until some point in 1809. Between June and October 1810 she was converted to a lightly armed troopship with fourteen 9-pounders on the upper deck, two on the forecastle and six 18-pound carronades on the quarterdeck. Commander Lord Balgonie joined her in September. In March 1812, under Lieutenant George Knight, she transported troops to Lisbon and Catalonia then North America. (Note: On 30 March the 2nd Royal Marine Battalion embarked on the ships HMS Romulus, HMS Diomede, HMS Nemesis, and HMS Fox on 30 March, set sail on 7 April, and arrived in Bermuda on 29 May 1813.) She assisted in the capture of Ocracoke and Portsmouth, North Carolina, in July 1813. She was after taken to Bermuda where she was used as a hospital ship. This was a short-lived appointment, and she paid off in December. She was later recommissioned while still in Bermuda but was eventually broken up there in November 1816.
