= Swarland =

Coordinates: 55.325°N 1.742°W

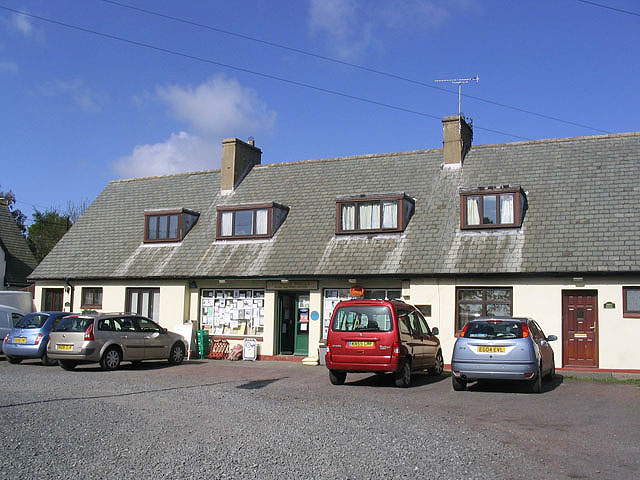
- Swarland village shop and Post Office (now closed)

- Location within Northumberland
- OS grid reference: NU165035
- Civil parish: Newton-on-the-Moor and Swarland
- Unitary authority: Northumberland
- Shire county: Northumberland
- Region: North East
- Country: England
- Sovereign state: United Kingdom
- Post town: MORPETH
- Postcode district: NE65
- Dialling code: 01670
- Police: Northumbria
- Fire: Northumberland
- Ambulance: North East
- UK Parliament: North Northumberland

Swarland is a small modern village (satellite to a holiday park) and former civil parish, now in the parish of Newton-on-the-Moor and Swarland, in the county of Northumberland, England, situated about 7 miles (11 km) south of the market town of Alnwick and 25 miles (40 km) north of the city of Newcastle upon Tyne. In 1951 the parish had a population of 368.

== History ==
The manor of Swarland was owned from ancient times by the de Haslerigg family of Swarland Old Hall until the 18th century. In 1741 the estate was purchased by Richard Grieve of Swansford. In 1765 his son Davison Richard Grieve commissioned architect John Carr to build a new park and mansion, Swarland Hall. The new house was later the home of Alexander Davison, a friend of Horatio Nelson, who in 1807 erected the Nelson Memorial on the park. Many of the modern local street names are linked with Nelson, including Nelson Drive, Admiral Close and Lady Hamilton Drive.

The new Hall was demolished in the early 1930s and in 1936 a new village of 77 cottages was built on the estate by the Fountains Abbey Settlers Trust.

== Present day ==
The village has a sporting culture; with various amenities at hand such as: 3 tennis courts, a 5-a-side court, football field, equestrian centre and an astroturf bowling Green and now has a basketball court. It also hosts Percy Wood Country Retreat and Golf Course that is part of the old Percy Wood area and a tourist attraction.

== Governance ==
Swarland is in the parliamentary constituency of Berwick-upon-Tweed. Swarland was formerly a township in Felton parish, from 1866 Swarland was a civil parish in its own right until it was abolished on 1 April 1955 and merged with Newton on the Moor.

== Landmarks ==
Swarland Old Hall is a small 17th-century country house and is a Grade II* listed building. The house which has a four-bay south front and two storeys with attics was built in the late 17th century and incorporates fabric of earlier properties. The east front is notable for its castellated full height screen wall with three blind Gothic arches.

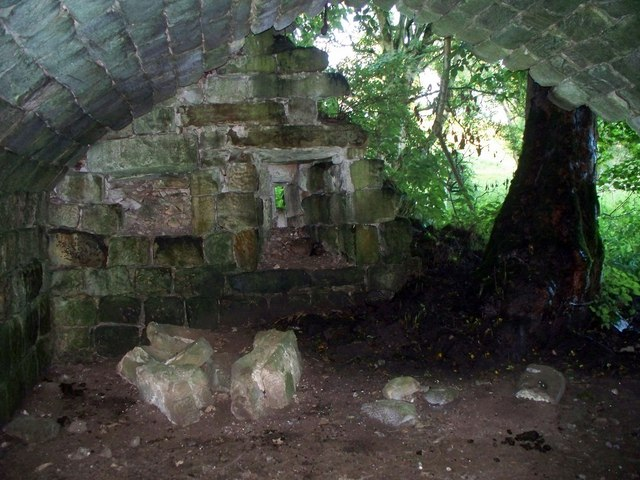
Overgrass Tower

A railed monument nearby (Grade II listed) records the death of William Haslerigg in 1681. His brother and heir was High Sheriff of Northumberland in 1698.

A little over a mile to the west of the village, by the Swarland Burn, are the ruins of Overgrass Tower, a medieval tower house dating from the fourteenth or fifteenth century.

== Transport ==
=== The A1 junction ===
The junction with the A1 has had numerous crashes, some fatal, so people now often travel through Newton on the Moor when travelling north. All local 'bus services to and from Swarland were cancelled in 2014. The nearest 'bus stop is at the bottom of Lemingtom Lane, a good mile walk from the bottom of Park Road. However, the crossing/junction has been improved in recent times so that anyone exiting from the village area and wishing to travel south onto the A1 will now find a 'refuge area' so you can cross the fast dual carriageway in two distinct stages.

== Education ==
Swarland First School is a small school in the village, with approximately 60 students between the ages of 3 and 9. The children usually go on to either an Alnwick or Rothbury middle school. Quite a number of pupils from the first settlers have left the village to become the parents of Doctors, nurses and police officers of senior rank. One boy was employed at Buckingham Palace as a footman and married the Queen Mother and Princess Margaret's travelling maid. A gift of daffodils was given to the school by this man's brother and planted around the school and on the verges in 2009. In memory of all those first pupils when the school first opened.

== Sports and Recreation ==
The first recorded leek show in North East England was held in Swarland in 1846.

An annual pantomime is performed by the local drama group. Traditionally performed during December, over the last few years, it has been performed during February. Some of the recent performances have included takes on Star Trek, Sleeping Beauty and Western(genre).

There is a Working Men's Club in the village. Every year, the working men's club holds a Quoits competition, which is affectionately claimed by locals to be the 'Quoits World Championships'.
