= Alexander Davison =

English businessman and government contractor (1750–1829)

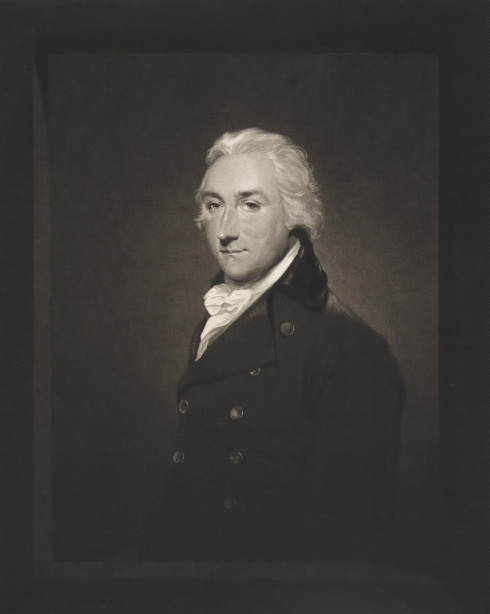
- Born: 2 April 1750; Lanton, Northumberland, England
- Died: 1829 (aged 78–79); Brighton, England

Alexander Davison (1750–1829) was an English businessman and government contractor. He was a close friend of Admiral Lord Nelson.

== Life ==
Davison was born on 2 April 1750 at a farm in Lanton, Northumberland. His business career began in a counting house in London before being sent by his employer to the former French colony of Canada. He worked as a merchant in the province of Quebec before and during the American Revolutionary War. By the time the war ended, Davison had purchased his own ship and amassed a fortune, working with his younger brother, George. He had gained a reputation as a merchant, and was a respected member of the community. He and his brother both held seats on the legislative council.

At his pinnacle he owned various interests from textile factories to shipping. He also worked as a supply agent for the British government procuring coal and other supplies for the military. Additionally his close friendship with Admiral Nelson brought him business as a prize agent after the Battle of the Nile and the Battle of Copenhagen.

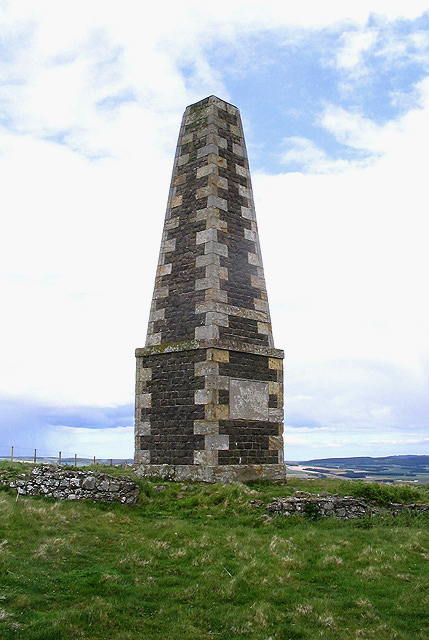
A monument on Lanton Hill was created by Alexander for his brother and Alexanders name was added in time

He was imprisoned for fraud in May 1804 as a result of his attempt to bribe the voters in one of England's rotten boroughs of Ilchester. He spent a year inside the King's Bench Prison in London. In 1809 Davison was again tried and found guilty on charges of fraud. This time though the accusations related to his activity as a supply agent for the British government. During these dealings he fraudulently (or at least carelessly) charged the government agency fees for goods supplied from his own factories. These fees were meant to compensate agents for the expense and effort of finding the cheapest supplier for the government's contract but Davison earned them as well as the usual profit margins on the goods he supplied from his factory. He served a sentence of twenty-one months inside Newgate Prison starting in May 1809.

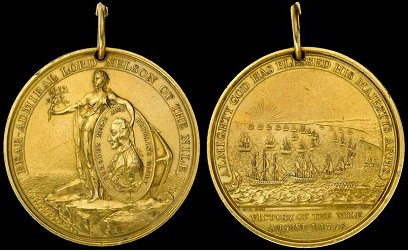
Battle of the Nile Medal Gold

Davison is responsible for several acts that glorified Nelson's public image. These included the creation of a medal commemorating the victory at the Battle of the Nile and the creation of the Nelson Memorial at his estate at Swarland, Northumberland. As a close friend of the Admiral he acted as an intermediary when Nelson's marriage to his wife, Frances Nelson fell apart due in large part to his affair with Emma Hamilton.

Davison died in 1829 in Brighton, England.

== Family ==
Davison married Harriett, daughter of the banker Robert Gosling. They had three sons and three daughters. The children included the equerry Sir William Davison (died 1873), the second son. The second daughter, Dorothy, married Samuel Edward Widdrington.

== Citations ==
Military offices
Preceded by Joseph Hunt	Treasurer of the Ordnance; 1806–1807	Succeeded by Joseph Hunt
