= Lanton, Northumberland =

Village in Northumberland, England

Coordinates: 55.5750°N 2.116°W

Lanton
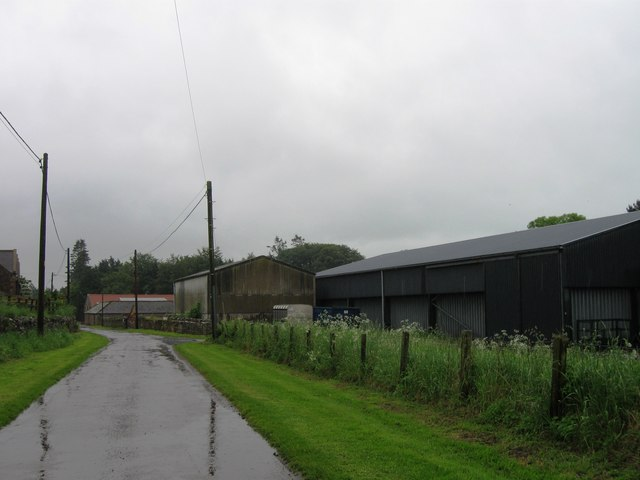
- Lanton

- Location within Northumberland
- Civil parish: Ewart
- Unitary authority: Northumberland
- Ceremonial county: Northumberland
- Region: North East
- Country: England
- Sovereign state: United Kingdom
- Post town: Wooler
- Postcode district: NE71 6
- Dialling code: 01668 2
- Police: Northumbria
- Fire: Northumberland
- Ambulance: North East
- UK Parliament: Berwick-upon-Tweed

Lanton is a hamlet and former civil parish, now in the parish of Ewart, in the north of the county of Northumberland, near the town of Wooler, the Cheviots and the Scottish Borders. The hamlet lies in the valley of Glendale, which takes its name from the River Glen. In 1951 the parish had a population of 56.

A prominent landmark on Lanton Hill is the Lanton Monument built by Alexander Davison in dedication to his brother, John Davison of Lanton, in 1827.

== History ==
In 1848 Lanton's buildings were said to be scattered and the population was said to be 83.

Lanton was formerly a township in Kirk-Newton parish, from 1866 Lanton was a civil parish in its own right until it was abolished on 1 April 1955 and merged with Ewart.

== Notable people ==
- Alexander Davison was born here in 1750. He became a government contractor and close friend of Admiral Lord Nelson.
