= Joseph Hunt (MP) =

British politician

Joseph Hunt (1762–1816) was a British Tory MP who also held various senior posts linked to the Admiralty and Royal Navy.

== Life ==
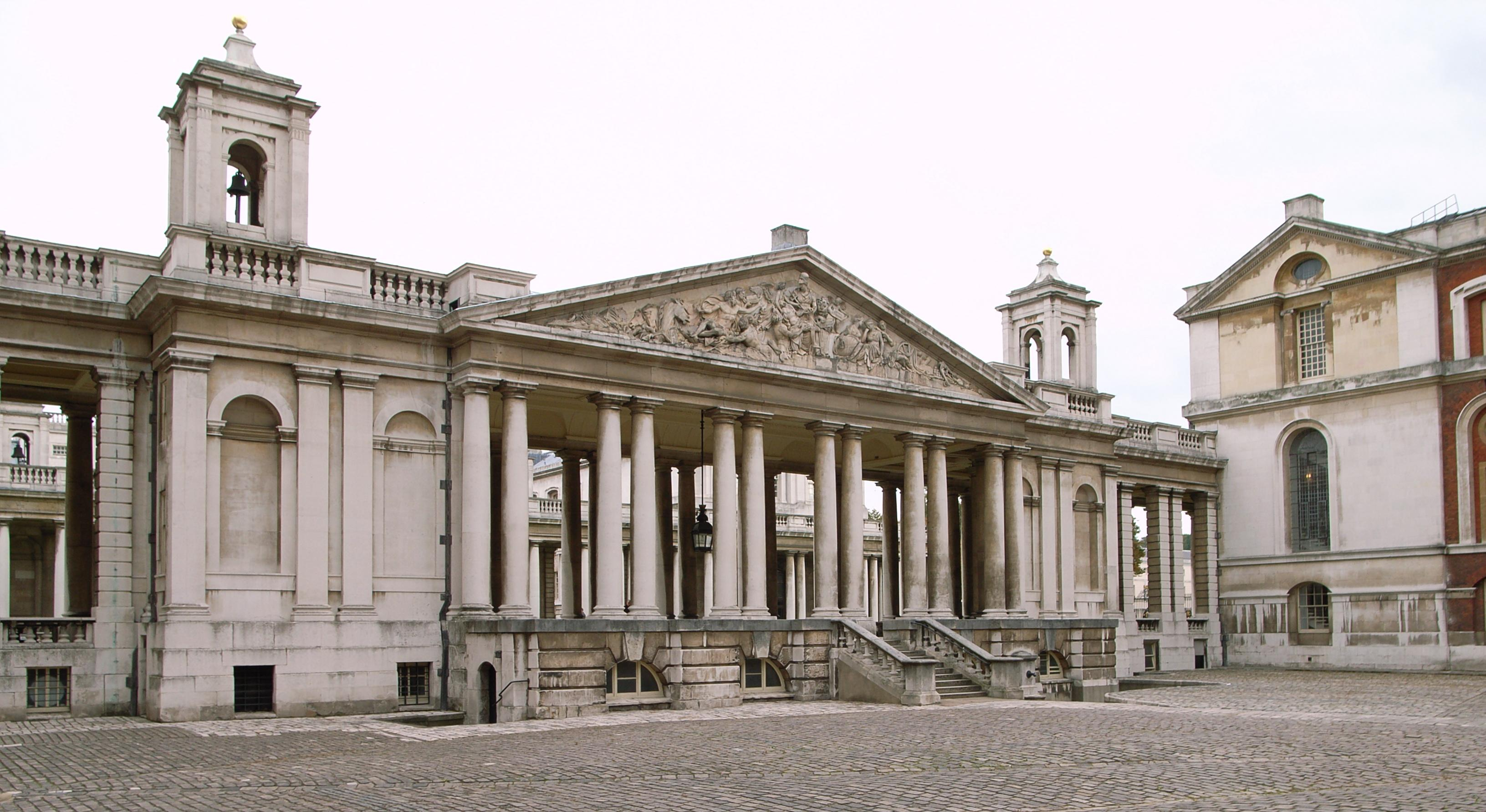
Greenwich Royal Naval Hospital

He was born at Portsea, Portsmouth in January 1762 the son of Edward Hunt a shipbuilder at Portsmouth Dockyard (later Surveyor of the Navy) and his wife Anne Irish (d.1804). The family also had a London house at Blackheath. He was educated at Winchester College from 1773 to 1777.

From 1779 (aged only 17) he was Clerk to his father in his role as Surveyor of the Navy (to which post he had been appointed in 1778). Through this role he became private secretary to Admiral Sir Samuel Hood at the Admiralty 1781–82. In 1788 he became private secretary to John Pitt, 2nd Earl of Chatham in the Admiralty, retaining this role until at least 1802. In 1789 he became "Receiver" in the Admiralty's Sixpenny Office. From 1790 to 1798 he was commander of the victualling office overseeing supplies to the Royal Navy. He was in charge of the Transport Office 1798 to 1802 (dealing with French prisoners-of-war), clerk of deliveries in the Ordnance Department 1802–03, Treasurer to the Royal Navy 1803 to 1806 and 1807 to 1810.

In 1791 he was appointed Director of Greenwich Hospital, London, one of the Admiralty's most important locations. He held this post for 19 years.

In 1804 he stood unsuccessfully as MP for Barnstaple but in 1807 was elected MP for Queenborough. He was forced to resign as treasurer in January 1810 having left a deficit of £11,000 in his first 18 months and a breathtaking £93,300 in his second 18 months. As a consequence of what appeared to be embezzlement Hunt not only lost his job in May by expulsion from Parliament but also had his house in Lee, Kent confiscated by the Ordnance Board.

Disgraced, he died in France on 10 January 1816.

== Family ==
In April 1785 he married Catherine Davie, daughter of Sir John Davie, 7th baronet of Creedy in Devon.
