= Edward Hunt (shipbuilder) =

British shipbuilder and designer (c.1730–1787)

Sir Edward Hunt (c.1730–1787) was a British shipbuilder and designer who rose to be Surveyor of the Navy.

== Life ==
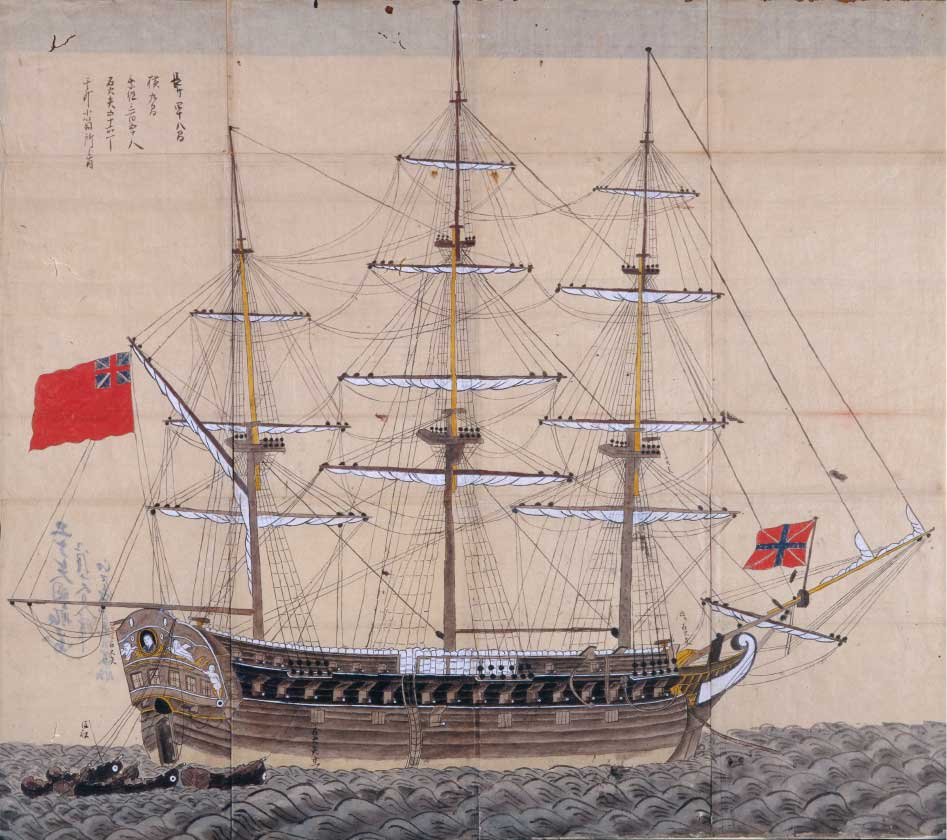
Minerva class frigate

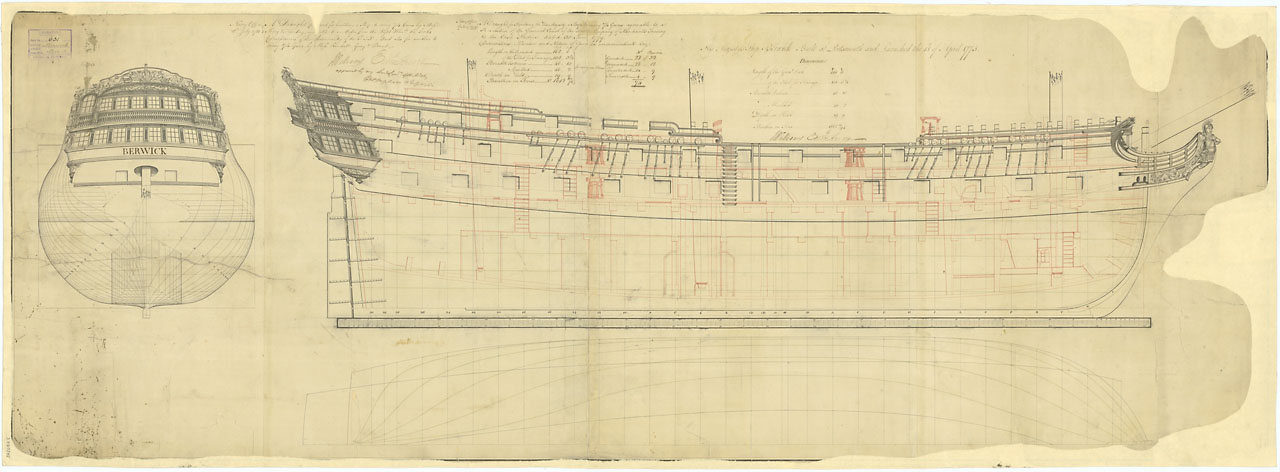
Hunt's drawing of HMS Berwick

He was born around 1730.

He is first recorded in the service of the Royal Navy as a Master Boat Builder in 1757 at Portsmouth Dockyard. This position was usually preceded by an apprenticeship as a ship's carpenter on a Royal Navy ship, plus a period as ship's carpenter both at sea and on shore. In 1762 he was appointed Assistant Master Shipwright at Sheerness Dockyard then was promoted first to Master Caulker. In 1765 he moved to Woolwich Dockyard as Assistant Master Shipwright. In 1767 he was given full charge (as Master Shipwright) at Sheerness Dockyard and from that time the Royal Navy list his works. In 1772 he moved to the far larger dock at Portsmouth.

In April 1778 he was appointed Surveyor of the Navy to assist Sir John Williams. From December 1784 he was the senior Surveyor and was working with John Henslow.

He ceased work in December 1786 and died within a few weeks, his will being probated on 31 January 1787.

== Ships Built ==
- HMS Portland (1770) 50-gun ship of the line launched at Harwich
- HMS Berwick (1775) 74-gun ship of the line launched at Portsmouth
- HMS Sphinx (1775) 20-gun ship
- HMS Cygnet (1776) 14-gun sloop
- HMS Swift (1777) 14-gun sloop
- HMS Lion (1777) 64-gun ship of the line launched at Portsmouth

== Ships Designed ==
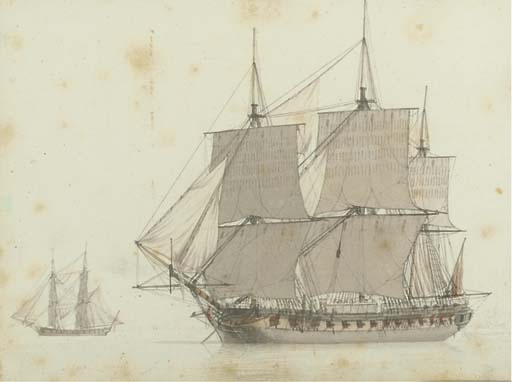
HMS Trusty

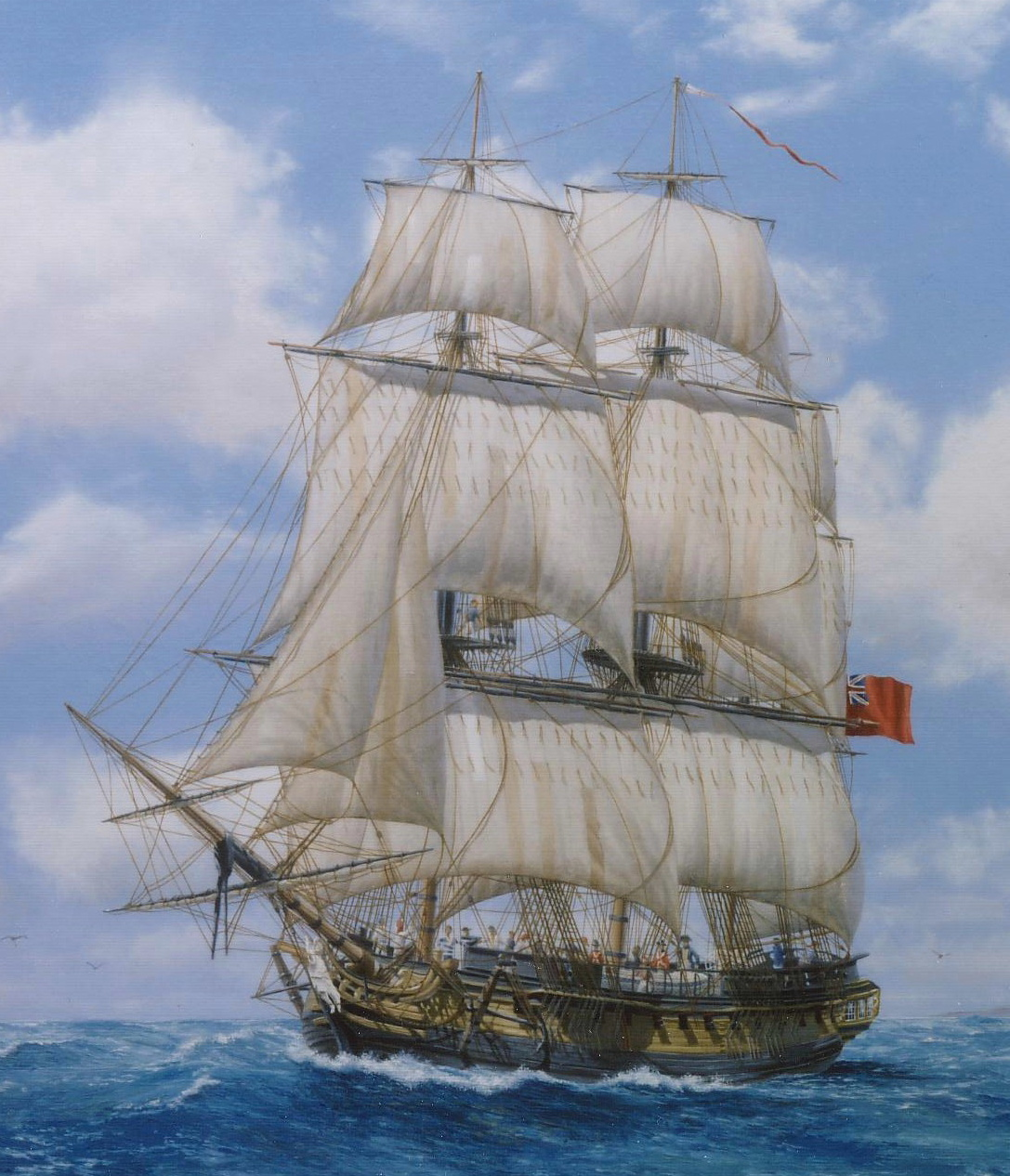
HMS Melampus

- Active-class frigate (1778) 32-gun frigates first launched in 1779
- Minerva-class frigate (1778) 32-gun frigates first launched in 1780
- Ganges-class ship of the line (1779) 74-gun ships of the line first launched in 1782
- Perseverance-class frigate (1779) 36-fun frigates first launched in 1781
- HMS Active (1779) 36-gun frigate first launched in 1780
- Grampus-class ship (1780) 50-gun ships
- Hermione-class frigate (1780) 32-gun frigates first launched in 1782
- Echo-class sloop (1781) 16-gun sloops
- HMS Trusty (1781) 50-gun ship of the line launched in 1782
- Adventure-class ship (1782) 44-gun ships first launched in 1785
- HMS Culloden (1782) 74-gun ship of the line launched in 1783
- HMS Melampus (1782) 36-gun frigate launched in 1785
- HMS Squirrel (1783) 20-gun post ship launched in 1785
- HMS Caesar (1786) 80-gun ship of the line launched in 1793
- HMS Retaliation (1799) 32-gun frigate - a remodelling of HMS Hermione
- HMS Queen Charlotte (1805) 100-gun ship of the line launched in 1810

== Family ==
Around 1760 he married Ann(e) Irish (d.1804). The family lived in Portsea, Portsmouth and had a London house at Blackheath.

Their first son Joseph Hunt became Director of Greenwich Hospital, London and married Catherine Davie daughter of Sir John Davie, 7th baronet.
