= John Williams (Surveyor of the Navy) =

Sir John Williams (1700 – c.1784) was a British shipbuilder and designer who rose to be Surveyor of the Navy, the highest position in British naval architecture.

== Life ==
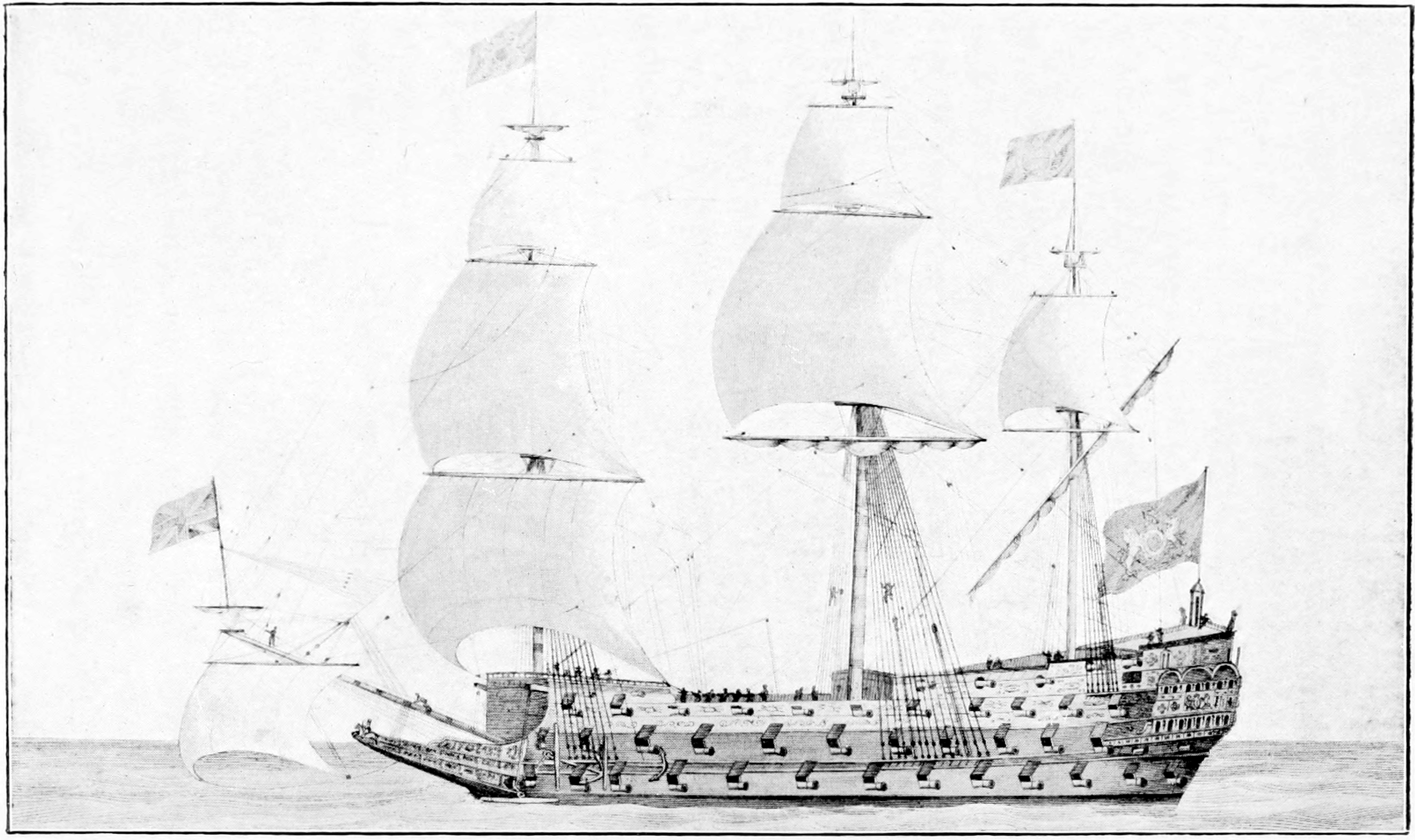
HMS Royal Sovereign

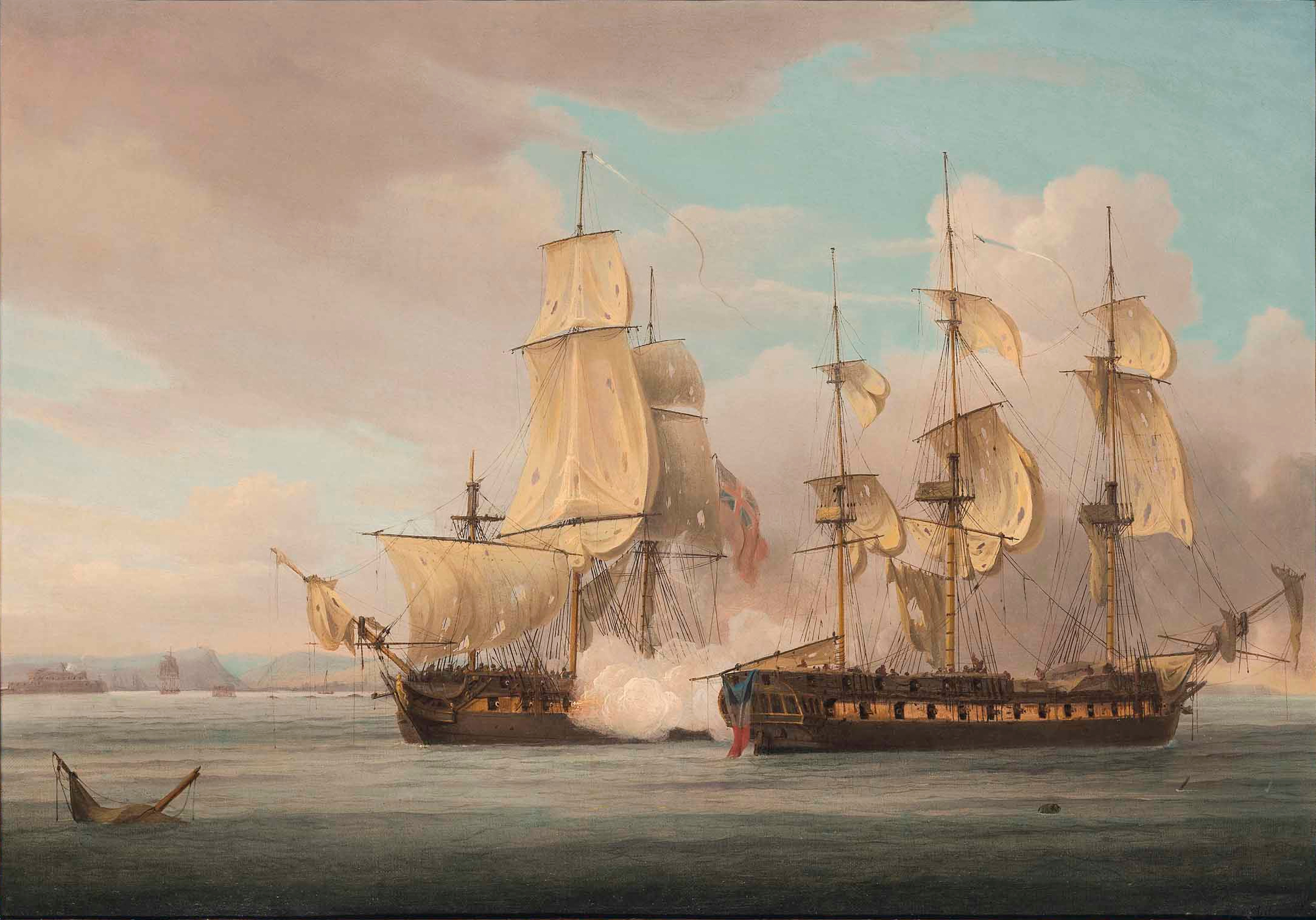
A Flora-class frigate at battle

He was born in 1700 the grandson of a John Williams who designed HMS Crescent in 1642.

In 1762 he was a Master Shipwright in Sheerness Dockyard. His only named ship construction is HMS Winchelsea.

In June 1765 he was appointed Surveyor to the Navy, working alongside Thomas Slade. This role was based in the Admiralty and involved the master planning of the British fleet and strategic planning of harbour improvements.

In April 1778, he was joined at the Admiralty by Edward Hunt. He left in December 1784 his position being filled by John Henslow.

== Ships designed ==
- Portland-class ship (1766) 50-gun ships
- Swan-class ship-sloop (1766) 14-gun sloops of which at least 25 were built
- Amazon-class frigate (1770) thirty-three 32-gun frigates launched from 1773
- Enterprise-class frigate (1771) twenty-seven 28-gun frigates launched from 1773
- HMS Vengeance (1771) 74-gun ship of the line launched in 1774
- Experiment-class ship (1772) a series of 50-gun ships
- Sphinx-class post ship (1773) a series of ten 20-gun post ships
- HMS Royal Sovereign (1774) 100-gun ship of the line not launched until 1786 and Collingwood's flagship at the Battle of Trafalgar
- HMS Montagu (1775) 74-gun ship of the line launched in 1779
- Porcupine-class post ship (1776) ten 24-gun post ships
- HMS Jupiter (1776) 50-gun ship launched in 1778.
- Alert-class cutter (1776) a series of 14-gun cutters
- Sprightly-class cutter (1776) a series of 10-gun cutters
- HMS Childers (1778) a 10-gun sloop
- Flora-class frigate (1778) a series of four 36-gun frigates
- L'Experiment (1779) 50-gun ship of the line
- HMS Latona (1779) 38-gun frigate launched in 1781
- HMS Unicorn (1781) 20-gun ship (redesign of the "Unicorn Prize")
- HMS Raven (1782) 18-gun sloop (redesign of HMS Ceres?)
- HMS Pigmy (1782) 14-gun cutter
- HMS Blonde (1783) 32-gun frigate launched in 1787
