= Tudor navy =

English navy (1485–1603)

Tudor Navy Ensign 1485–1603

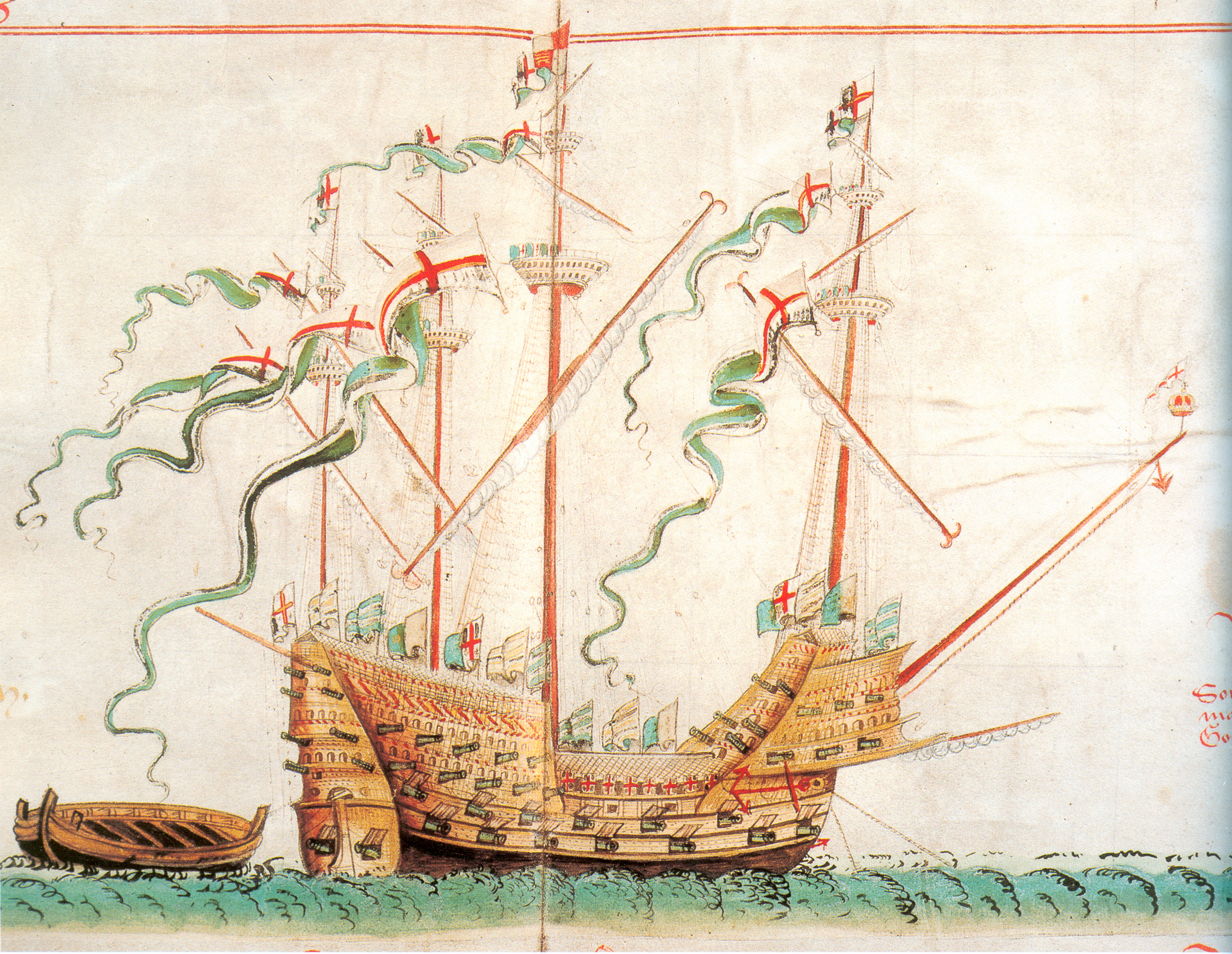
The Tudor navy carrack Henry Grace à Dieu (launched 1514) as depicted in the 1546 Anthony Roll

The Tudor navy was the navy of the Kingdom of England under the ruling Tudor dynasty (1485–1603). The period involved important and critical changes that led to the establishment of a permanent navy and laid the foundations for the future Royal Navy.

== History ==
=== Henry VII ===
Henry VII fostered sea power. He supported the old 1381 act that stated "that, to increase the navy of England, no goods or merchandises shall be either exported or imported, but only in ships belonging to the King's subjects." Although there is no evidence of a conscious change of policy, Henry soon embarked on a program of building merchant ships larger than previously. He also invested in dockyards and commissioned Sir Reginald Bray to construct a dry dock in 1495 at Portsmouth (the oldest surviving example), with Sweepstake and Mary Fortune being the first ships built there in 1497.

With the crown he acquired Grace à Dieu, Governor, Martin Garcia, Mary of the Tower, Trinity, Falcon, and possibly Bonaventure. He purchased Caravel of Ewe (Caravel of Eu, in Normandy), and perhaps also a small craft called King's Bark; he captured Le Prise in 1490 and renamed it Margaret. In 1487 under the superintendences of Sir Richard Guldeford and Bray, he built the 225-gun four-masted Regent. He ordered construction of the 141-gun four-masted Sovereign, built partly out of the re-shaped clinker timbers of Grace Dieu. This ship originally was privately constructed around 1449, and is not be confused with the 1416 Grace Dieu of Henry V now believed to be lying in the River Hamble.

=== Henry VIII ===
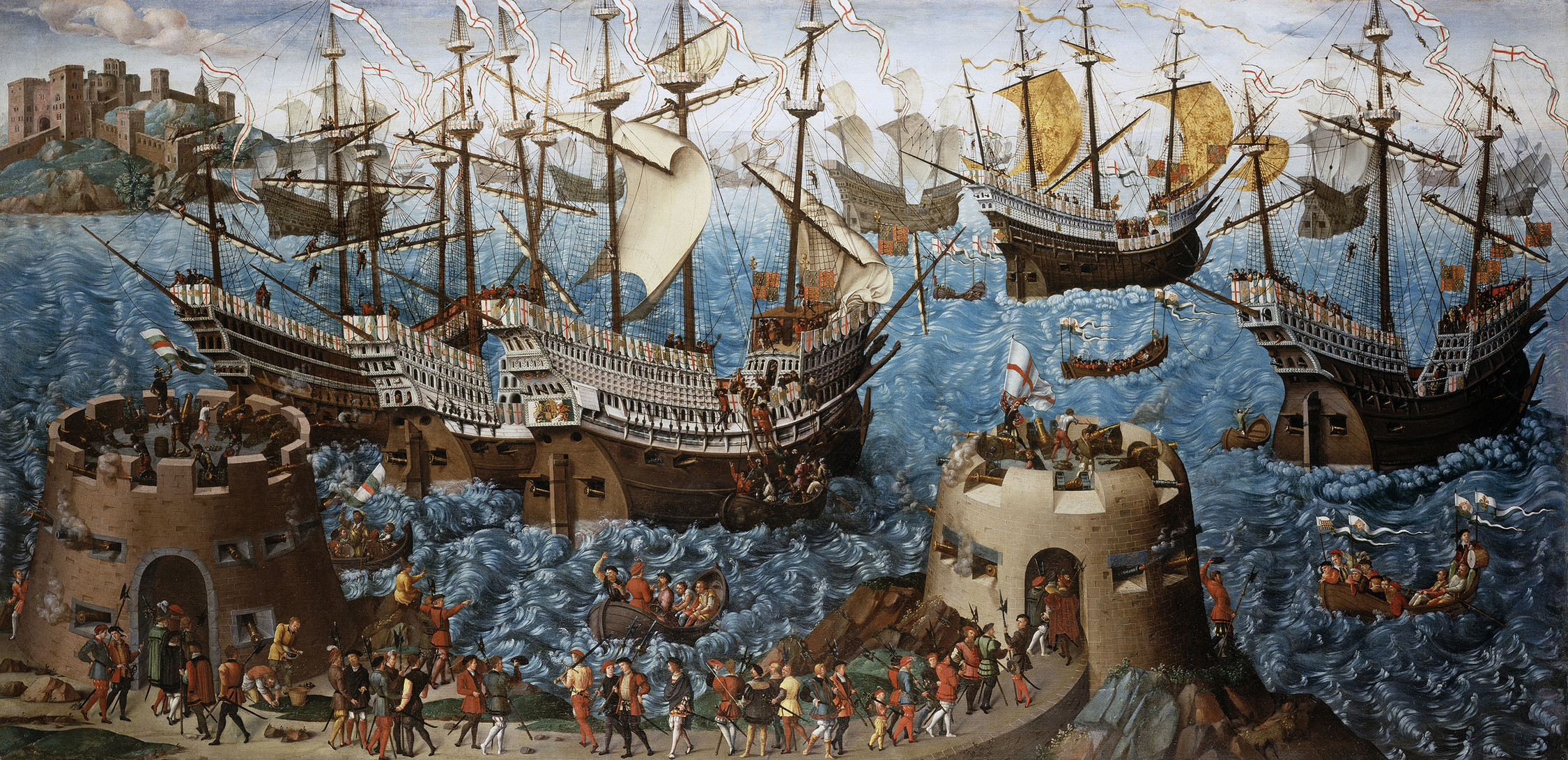
The Embarkation of Henry VIII at Dover, a contemporary painting that, just like the Anthony Roll, was intended to serve as a showpiece of the Tudor navy's might.

Biographer Jack Scarisbrick says that Henry VIII (reigned 1509–1547) deserved his traditional title of "Father of the English navy". He inherited seven small warships from his father and added two dozen more by 1514. In addition to those built in England, he bought up Italian and Hanseatic warships. Henry's fleet was the most powerful naval force to date in English history: 24 ships led by the 1600-ton "Henry Imperial"; the fleet carried 5000 combat marines and 3000 sailors. It forced the outnumbered French fleet back to its ports, took control of the English Channel, and blockaded Brest. Henry was the first king to organize the navy as a permanent force, with a permanent administrative and logistical structure, funded by tax revenue and supervised by the new Navy Board. His personal attention was concentrated on land, where he founded the royal dockyards, planted trees for shipbuilding, enacted laws for inland navigation, guarded the coastline with fortifications, set up a school for navigation and designated the roles of officers and sailors. He closely supervised the construction of all his warships and their guns, knowing their designs, speed, tonnage, armaments, and battle tactics. He encouraged his naval architects, who perfected the Italian technique of mounting guns in the waist of the ship, thus lowering the center of gravity and making it a better platform. He supervised the smallest details and enjoyed nothing more than presiding over the launching of a new ship. He drained his treasury on military and naval affairs, diverting the revenues from new taxes and the sales of monastery lands as well as taking out foreign loans and debasing the English currency.

In 1512 Sir Edward Howard took over as Lord Admiral, and attacked on 10 August at Pointe Saint-Mathieu, with inconclusive results despite a memorable slugging match between the English Regent and the French Cordelière resulting in the destruction of both. Additional combat in 1513 resulted in the death of Sir Edward, and his brother Thomas Howard took his place. In 1514 the 1,500-ton carrack Henry Grace à Dieu was launched, the first English two-decker and one of the earliest warships equipped with gunports and heavy bronze cannons. Henry also commissioned the Anthony Roll (now in the Pepys Library), a survey of his navy as it was around 1546, from which comes much of the pictorial evidence for his ships.

Henry VIII was threatened by the Pope's excommunication proceedings in 1538 and the peace between France and the Holy Roman Empire, which would allow them to unite against a heretical England. The projected force of the navy, which had been reinforced by 40 men-at-war at this point in his reign, would be needed to protect England from invasion until the threat of invasion passed in 1541 when France and the Holy Roman Empire renewed hostilities.

Henry VIII initiated the casting of cannons in England. By the late Elizabethan age (see the Aldernay wreck survey) English iron workers using blast furnaces developed the technique of producing cast iron cannons which, while not as durable as the prevailing bronze cannons, they were much cheaper and enabled England to arm its navy more easily.

In the end, the chief result of the war with France was a decision to keep the 30 ships active during peacetime. This entailed the establishment of a number of shore facilities, and the hiring of additional administrators; a royal shipwright appears in 1538. By 1540 the navy consisted of 45 ships, a fleet of 20 ships was sent to Scotland in 1544 to land troops to burn Edinburgh, and in 1545 Lord Lisle had a force of 80 ships fighting a French force of 130 attempting to invade England in conjunction with the Battle of the Solent (where the Mary Rose sank). In the same year a memorandum established a "king's majesty's council of his marine", the first formal organization comprising seven officers, each in charge of a specific area, presided over by "Lieutenant of the Admiralty" or Vice-Admiral Thomas Clere. When war was not at hand the Navy was mostly occupied with chasing pirates.

Historian G.R. Elton argues that Henry indeed built up the organisation and infrastructure of the Navy, but it was not a useful weapon for his style of warfare. It lacked a useful strategy. It did serve as a defence against invasion, and for enhancing England's international prestige.

=== Edward and Mary ===
Edward VI and Mary I added little new to their father's navy. Although the navy was involved in the maneuverings following the death of Henry VIII, it was ineffective. Mary maintained the building program, the navy performed satisfactorily if not outstandingly (it did not prevent the loss of Calais) in the war with France of 1557 to 1559. However, the marriage of Mary I and Philip II led to trade with Spain, allowing English shipwrights to examine and adapt modern Spanish galleon design to the needs of the English Navy as English ports were soon visited by both Spanish warships and merchantmen. Philip was undoubtedly interested in the English navy as the chief defence of the realm of England and its potential to be deployed in the support of his father. This would later prove crucial to the growth and development of the race-built galleon and the Elizabethan Navy that would obtain some triumphs against the Spanish Armada during the war between Protestant England and Catholic Spain.

=== Elizabeth I ===
While Henry VIII had launched the Royal Navy, his successors King Edward VI and Queen Mary I had ignored it and it was little more than a system of coastal defence. Elizabeth made naval strength a high priority. She risked war with Spain by supporting the "Sea Dogs," such as John Hawkins and Francis Drake, who preyed on the Spanish merchant ships carrying gold and silver from the New World.

A fleet review on Elizabeth I's accession in 1559 showed the navy to consist of 39 ships, and there were plans to build another 30, to be grouped into five categories (a foreshadowing of the rating system). Elizabeth kept the navy at a constant expenditure for the next 20 years, and maintained a steady construction rate.

In 1578, gates were installed at Deptford Dockyard, marking the construction of the first true dry dock; previously, dry docks had been walled in with temporary earth dockheads, which had to be dug away to launch ships.

By the 1580s, tensions with Spain had reached the breaking point, exacerbated by Elizabeth's support for the privateering expeditions of Hawkins, Drake, and others, and capped by the Cadiz raid of 1587, in which Drake destroyed dozens of Spanish ships. In 1588, Philip II of Spain launched the Spanish Armada against England, but after a running battle lasting over a week, the Armada was scattered and returned home. These famous battles were early actions in the long and costly Anglo-Spanish War of 1585–1604.

== Characteristics ==
The Tudor Navy saw the introduction of some of the first permanent, standing navies. Before this, during times of war, merchant ships were often commandeered and refitted into warships. This saw the addition of temporary wooden castles placed at the bow and stern to provide firing platforms for the ship's crew. Other strategies included having chartered squadrons, warships owned by private entrepreneurs who chartered their squadrons to the crown, or feudal navies, where a vassal, by part of their feudal contract, would raise and maintain a navy for their liege lord.

Naval warfare during this time was largely auxiliary to the operations of armies on land, transporting troops to the theater of war, or conducted as piracy. Before the widespread use of naval guns, warships had tried to grapple with each other so that soldiers could board the enemy ship, now they stood off and fired broadsides that would sink the enemy vessel. Weapons used by the crew included daggers, such as ballock knives, swords used by officers, pikes, bills, and a combination of archery and early handguns. The growing use of gunpowder saw the transition from navies being decentralized, localized, or ad hoc formations during wartime into a near-permanent fixture of maritime states.

Aside from the tangible military benefits that larger, newly cannon-equipped warships provided, they also were personifications of royal power and prestige. Henry V had powerful showpieces, the “great ships,” such as the 1,400-ton Gracedieu, Henry VIII's 800-ton Mary Rose, or James IV's 1,000-ton Michael. These ships were better expressions of royal power than effective weapons of war, however, using these ships for political effect has been episodic and inconsistent.

The Tudor Navy increasingly depended on the development of a permanent system of its food, or victualling, and logistical support. Early in the Tudor period, naval supply was handled only when necessary, relying largely on local contractors and improvised procurement to meet the immediate needs of ships preparing for sea. As naval operations grew more complex under Henry VIII and Elizabeth I, this decentralized model proved insufficient for sustaining extended campaigns or maintaining fleets for long periods. To address these challenges, the Crown gradually formalized the work of the Victualling Office, which became responsible for acquiring, storing, and distributing essential supplies such as salted meat, biscuit, fish, cheese, and beer. Increasing record-keeping and administrative oversight contributed to more predictable supply chains that supported the navy's growing strategic ambitions. By the mid-Elizabethan period, victualling contracts helped standardize quantities, quality expectations, and delivery schedules for suppliers. Infrastructure also expanded significantly during this time. Key naval yards at Deptford, Portsmouth, and the Port of London developed large bakehouses, brewhouses, cooperages, warehouses, and transport facilities to provision fleets more efficiently. These installations enabled faster turnarounds when fleets had to be outfitted for campaigns in Scotland, France, Ireland, or the Low Countries. Administrative improvements allowed officials to monitor waste and corruption more effectively, although fraud, like diluted beer, remained a persistent concern. Victualling also played a crucial role in crew health. The quality and composition of food rations had measurable effects on disease, morale, and survival rates during long voyages. These concerns grew increasingly important as England undertook longer maritime expeditions, including voyages supporting privateering ventures, exploration, and conflict with Spain. Foodborne illness and scurvy undermined crews’ health and operational readiness, and supply shortfalls constrained campaigning seasons are a few of the many thongs poor victualling had its consequences on. The pressures of an expanding fleet and Elizabethan naval operations during wartime accelerated naval and supply chain reforms that eventually led to more formal victualling offices in the later Stuart period. As the scale of naval operations increased, victualling also required advances in the methods for preserving and transporting perishable goods. Ships began sailing with salted fish and meat packed in barrels, and generous quantities of hard biscuit allowed long periods at sea without fresh supplies. Water was stored in wooden casks, but its quality deteriorated on extended voyages because some certain relied on limited beer rationing to avoid disease and dehydration. Because wooden barrels were bulky, a network of small “victualling tenders” often accompanied warships to deliver fresh provisions when anchorages or friendly ports were reached.

== Technological advancements ==
In the 1200s and 1300s, most naval guns were relatively small swivel pieces or breech-loading deck guns located at the ship's fore and aft. By the 1500s, developments saw the introduction of breechloaders and then muzzle-loaders. Henry VII saw the expanded employment of naval guns on ships during his reign. Henry VIII introduced gunports into the design of English warships; this saw naval guns being moved from the traditional high castles upon the deck to the lower waist of the ship, providing more stability and allowed for full broadsides.

The Navy yards were leaders in technical innovation, and the captains devised new tactics. Parker (1996) argues that the full-rigged ship was one of the greatest technological advances of the century and permanently transformed naval warfare. In 1573 English shipwrights introduced designs, first demonstrated in the Dreadnought, that allowed the ships to sail faster and maneuver better and permitted heavier guns. When Spain finally decided to invade and conquer England it was a fiasco; Hawkins and Drake's designs of English warships made them longer, faster, more maneuverable, and more heavily gunned than its Spanish counterpart. Superior English ships and seamanship foiled the invasion and led to the destruction of the Spanish Armada in 1588, marking the high point of Elizabeth's reign. Technically, the Armada failed because Spain's over-complex strategy required coordination between the invasion fleet and the Spanish army on shore. But the poor design of the Spanish cannons meant they were much slower in reloading in a close-range battle, allowing the English to take control. Spain and France still had stronger fleets, but England was catching up.

== Structure of the Tudor Navy ==
=== Key officials from 1485 to 1546 ===
Officers from 1485 to 1546 included:

Admiral of England, Ireland and Aquitaine

- John de Vere, 13th Earl of Oxford, 1485–1512
- Sir Edward Howard, 1512–1513
- Thomas Howard, 3rd Duke of Norfolk, 1513–1525
- Henry FitzRoy, 1st Duke of Richmond and Somerset, 1525–1536
- William Fitzwilliam, 1st Earl of Southampton, 1536–1540
- John Russell, 1st Lord Russell, 1540–1542
- John Dudley, 1st Viscount Lisle, 1542–1546

Clerk of Marine Causes

- Thomas Rogers, 12 December 1480 d.1488
- William Commersall, 1488-18 May 1495
- Robert Brygandine, 19 May 1495 – 1523
- Thomas Jermyn, and William Gonson, 1523–1533, (jointly)
- Leonard Thoreton 1533–1538
- Vice-Admiral Sir Thomas Spert, 1538–1543
- Edmund Wynter, 1544–1545
- John Wynter 1545 – d. 1546

Clerk Comptroller of the Navy

- John Hopton, 1512–1524
- Vice-Admiral, Sir Thomas Spert, 1524–1540
- John Osborne, 1540–1545
- William Broke, 1545–1561

Keeper of the Storehouses

- Vice-Admiral, Sir William Gonson, 1524–1545
- Richard Howlett, 1545–1546

=== Key officials from 1546 to 1603 ===
Officers from 1546 to 1603
Lord High Admirals of England

- Thomas Seymour, 1st Lord Seymour of Sudeley, 1546–1549
- John Dudley, 1st Earl of Warwick, 1549–1550
- Edward Clinton, 9th Lord Clinton, 1550–1554
- William Howard, 1st Lord Howard of Effingham, 1554–1558
- Edward Clinton, 1st Earl of Lincoln, 1558–1585
- Charles Howard, 1st Earl of Nottingham, 1585–1603

In 1546 Henry VIII establishes a Council of the Marine to oversee the administrative affairs of the Navy initially presided over by the Lieutenant of the Admiralty reporting to the Lord High Admiral.

Lieutenants of the Admiralty

- Sir Thomas Clere 1545–1552
- Sir William Woodhouse 1552–1565

Note:(post is vacant till 1604)

Treasurers of Marine Causes

- Sir Robert Legge, 1546–1549
- Benjamin Gonson, 1549–1547
- Benjamin Gonson and Sir John Hawkins, 1549–1577
- Sir John Hawkins, 1577–1595
- Sir Roger Longford, 1595–1598
- Sir Fulke Greville, 1st Baron Brooke, 1595–1603

Surveyors and Riggers of the Navy

- Benjamin Gonson 24 April 1546
- Vice-Admiral, Sir Thomas Spert, 1524–1540
- Vice Admiral Sir William Wynter 8 July 1549 (also Master of Naval Ordnance)
- Sir Henry Palmer 11 July 1589.
- Sir John Trevor 20 December 1598 – 1603.

Masters of Naval Ordnance

- Vice-Admiral Sir William Woodhouse, 1546–1552
- Vice Admiral Sir Thomas Wyndham, 1552–1553
- Vice Admiral Sir William Wynter 1557–1589 (also Surveyor)

Note:Office is discontinued after 1589.

Comptrollers of the Navy

- William Broke, 1545–1561
- Vice-Admiral, William Holstocke, 1561–1580
- William Borough, 1580–1598
- Sir Henry Palmer 1598–1603

Keepers of the Storehouses

- Richard Howlett, 1546–1548
- William Holstock, 1548–1560

Note: (office is merged with Treasurer of the Navy)

Surveyors of Marine Victuals

- Edward Baeshe, 1550–1587
- James Quarles, 1587–1595
- Sir Marmaduke Darrell, 1595–1603

Clerk of the Navy (also known as Clerk of the Ships)

- Richard Howlett, 24 April 1546 –10 October 1560.
- George Wynter, 10 October 1560 – 2 June 1567.
- John Hawkins, 2 June 1567, (appointed but did not succeed).
- George Wynter, 2 June 1567 – 24 March 1582.
- William B. B. Gonson, 24 March 1582 – 6 July 1596.
- Benjamin Gonson, 6 July 1596 – 17 April 1603.

== Legacy ==
Important though this period was, it represents a soon-lost high point. After 1601 the efficiency of the Navy declined gradually, and corruption grew, until it was brought under control by an inquiry of 1618.

The Royal Navy was founded during the Tudor navy's years, under King Henry VIII, who oversaw the construction of the first purpose-built English warships, and the first English warships armed with gunpowder-based naval artillery. The famed Tudor navy warship Ark Royal was honored with numerous later ships bearing the name.

== See also ==
- Admiralty in the 16th century
- History of the Royal Navy: 1500–1601
- Navy Board
- William Winter (admiral)
