= Gonson =

Gonson is a surname. Notable people with the surname include:

- Benjamin Gonson (c.1525–1577), Surveyor of the Royal Navy
- David Gonson (1510-1541), Knight of Malta and English Reformation Martyr of the Catholic Church (son of William)
- Claudia Gonson (born 1968), an American musician
- Sir John Gonson (died 1765), a British judge
- William Gonson (1482 - 1544), Vice-Admiral of Norfolk and Suffolk in 1536 (father of Benjamin)
