= William Wynter =

Welsh admiral under Queen Elizabeth I of England (c. 1521–1589)

Admiral Sir William Wynter
- Born: c. 1521; Brecknock, Powys, Wales
- Died: 20 February 1589
- Spouse: Mary Langton
- Military career
- Service years: 1544-1589
- Rank: Admiral, Vice-Admiral of England
- Commands: Admiral of the Irish Sea; Master of Naval Ordnance; Surveyor and Rigger of the Navy; Keeper of the Storehouse, Deptford Yard
- Conflicts: Siege of Leith; Spanish Armada

Admiral Sir William Wynter (c. 1521 – 20 February 1589) held the office of Surveyor and Rigger of the Navy for 40 years, from 1549 until his death in 1589, and combined that with the office of Master of Navy Ordnance from 1557. He was an admiral and principal officer of the Council of the Marine under Queen Elizabeth I of England and served the crown during the Anglo-Spanish War (1585–1604). He was returned four times to parliament in Elizabeth's time.

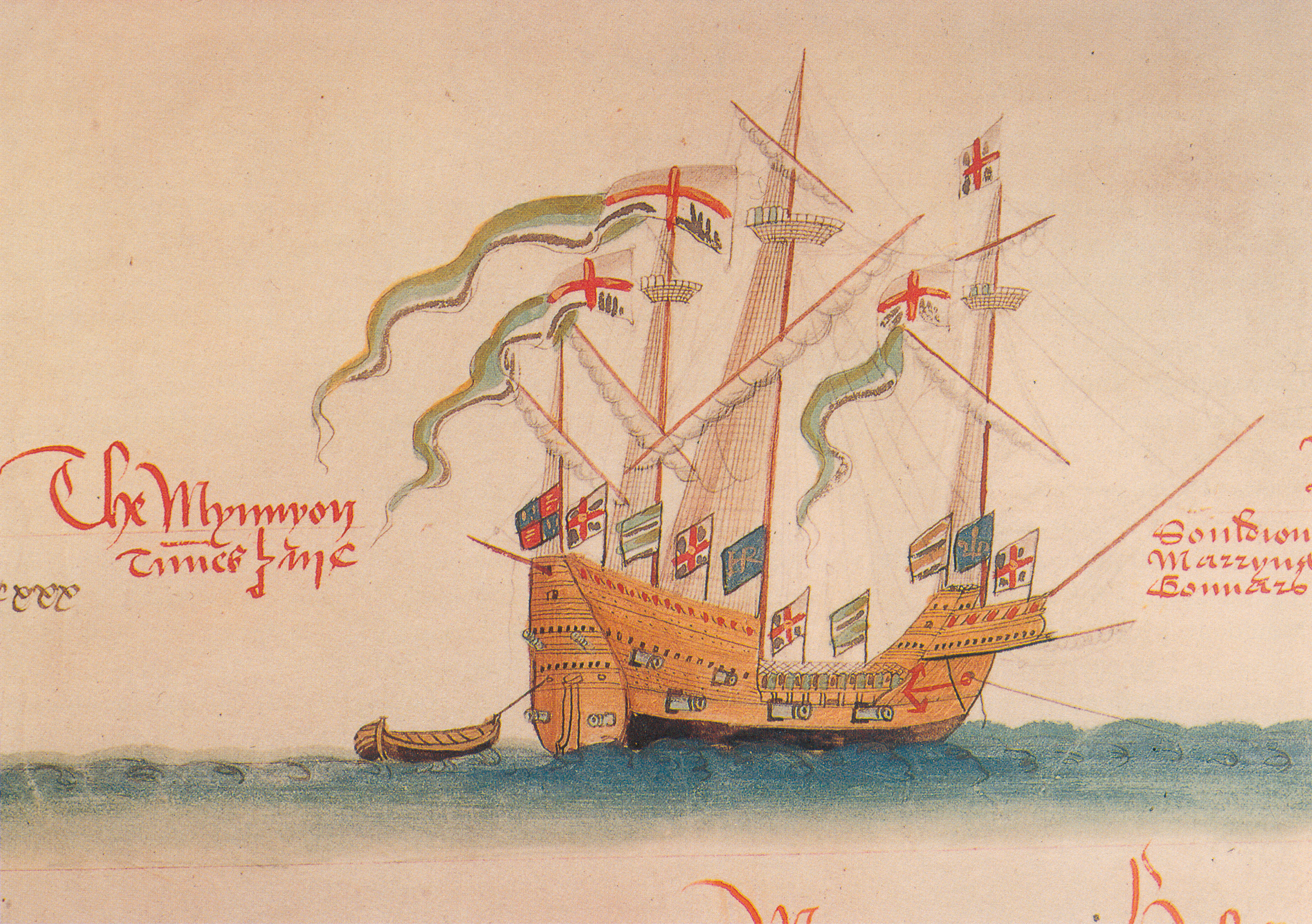
The Mynyon was William Wynter's command in 1552 and used in the evacuation of French troops from the Siege of Leith in 1560

== Personal ==
Wynter was born at Brecknock, the second of five sons of John Wynter (died 1545), a merchant and sea captain of Bristol and second Treasurer of the Navy (1544–1545), a friend of Thomas Cromwell's. His mother was Alice, daughter of William Tirrey of Cork, Ireland. His sister Agnes Winter (died 1574) in her second marriage became the first wife of the diplomat Thomas Wilson (1524–1581), and was the mother of his children. William's brothers Arthur Wynter and George Wynter also held important positions in relation to the Navy.

== Naval career ==
William was schooled in the Navy. He took part in the 260 ship expedition of 1544, which burned Leith and Edinburgh, and in 1545 he served in Lord Lisle's channel fleet. In July 1546 he held the office of Keeper of the King's Storehouse at Deptford Strand. In 1547 he took part in Protector Somerset's expedition to Scotland and victory at Pinkie, and in 1549, in an expedition to Guernsey and Jersey.

In April 1549 Wynter was appointed Surveyor of the Navy, succeeding his colleague Benjamin Gonson, who was simultaneously appointed Treasurer of Marine Causes. Gonson held his post until his death in 1577, and Wynter his until 1589, so that this partnership was a constant feature of the naval administration through the third quarter of the sixteenth century.

In December 1549, as captain of the Mynion, he captured the prize of a French ship, the Mary of Fécamp, laden with sugar. A reward of £100 was to be shared out among the crew of 300. In 1550, he superintended the removal of the ships from Portsmouth to Gillingham in the Thames Estuary. He took part in an aquatic pageant and water tournament on 19 June 1550 at Deptford devised by Lord Clinton, for Edward VI. Wynter defended a pretend fortress built on a boat from Clinton's sailors who attacked in four pinnaces. After a fire fight, Clinton won the castle.

Edward VI owed him £471 for a voyage to Ireland in 1552, and, in 1553, he went on a voyage to the Levant. In 1554, Wynter spent several months in the Tower of London under suspicion of involvement in Thomas Wyatt's rebellion against Mary I of England, until he was pardoned in November.

In 1557, Wynter was appointed Master of Navy Ordnance, a post he held along with the Surveyorship for the rest of his life. On 22 May 1558, Wynter brought ships from Dunkirk to Dover which were sailing on to Portsmouth. He was present at the burning of Le Conquet in July 1558.

At about this time William Wynter married Mary Langton, one of the daughters of the London merchant Thomas Langton, citizen and Skinner (died c. 1550) and his wife Mary Matthew of Colchester. The marriage reflected civic and mercantile interest: Mary Matthew, Wynter's mother-in-law, became Dame Mary Judde (died 1602), as the third wife of the Lord Mayor Sir Andrew Judde, a leading representative of the Muscovy Company, who died in 1558: she afterwards married the London alderman, citizen and Clothworker James Altham of Mark Hall, Latton, Essex (died 1582). Mary Langton's sister (Wynter's sister-in-law) Jane Langton was the wife of John Barne, son of the leading Muscovy merchant and Lord Mayor, George Barne (died 1558). Edward Wynter, eldest son of William and Mary, was born in 1560.

== Mission to Scotland, 1559-1560 ==
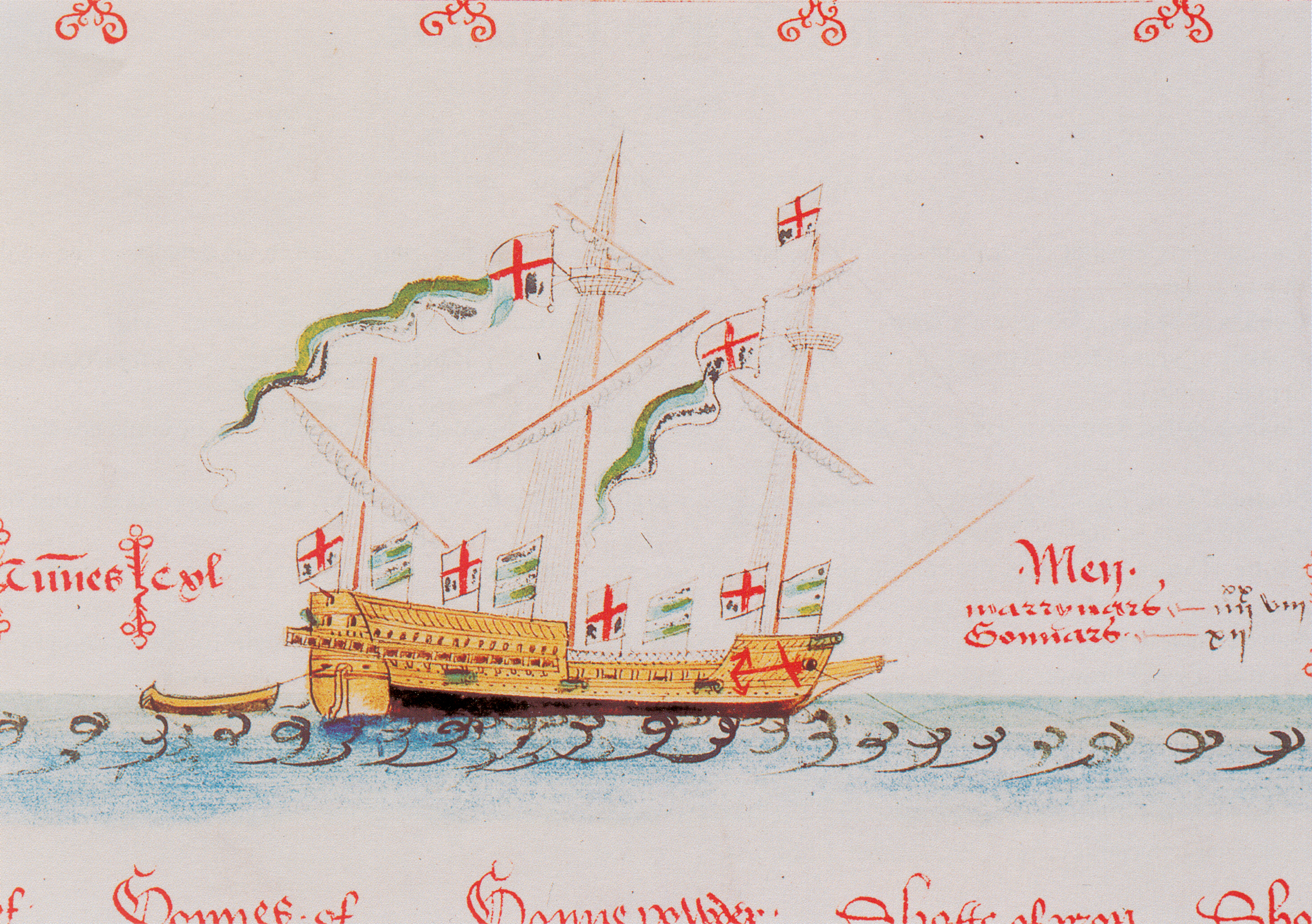
The Lyon, Wynter's flagship in 1560, from the Anthony Roll of 1547

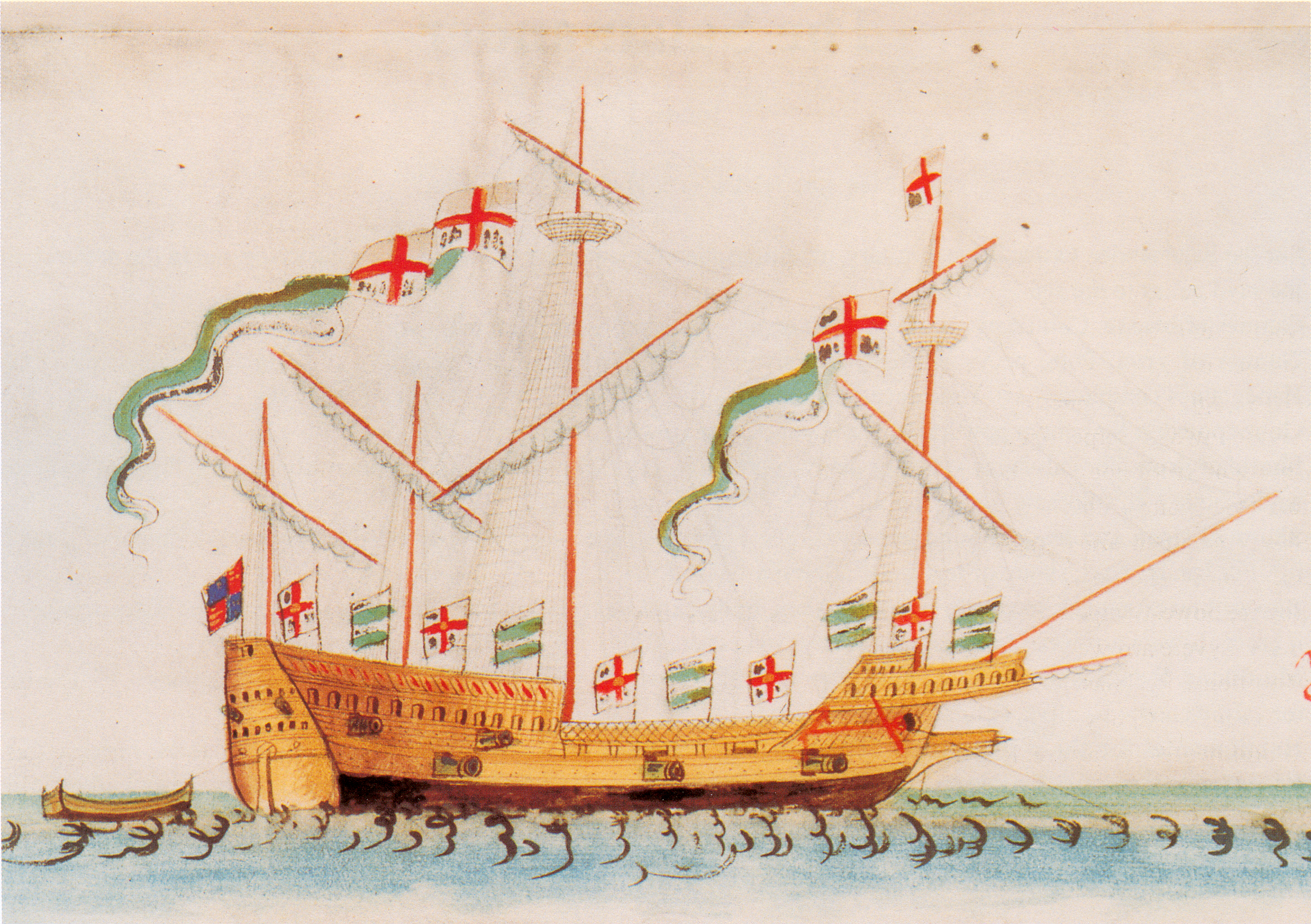
The Swallow was storm-damaged off Flamborough Head on 16 January 1560

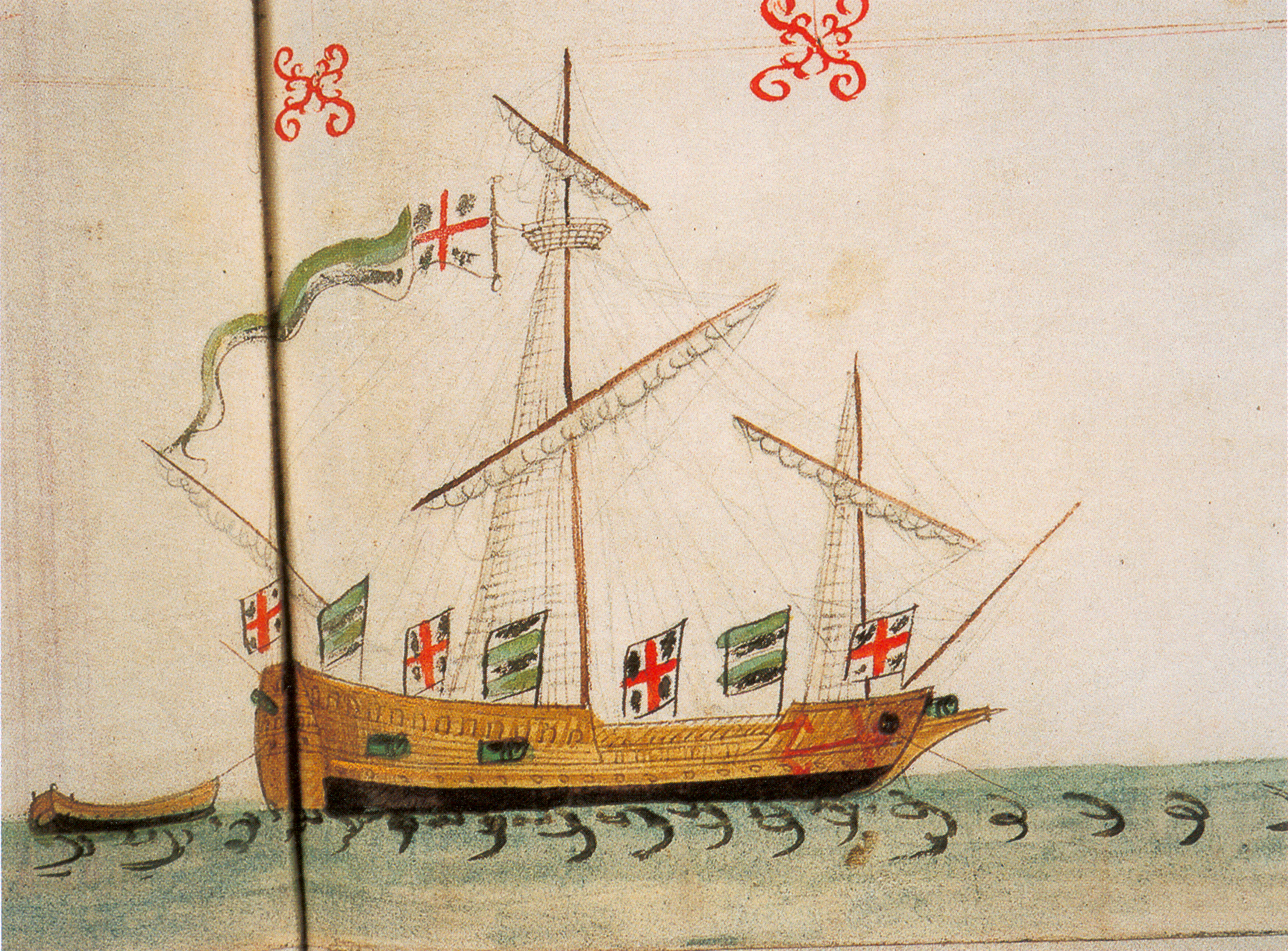
The Pinnace Saker followed Wynter to Scotland as a supply ship

Wynter was sent with a fleet to Scotland in January 1560 during the crisis of the Scottish Reformation commanding the Irish Squadron. In Scotland, Protestant lords, known as the "Lords of the Congregation" challenged the Catholic Regent Mary of Guise who was supported by French forces. Wynter commanded a fleet to guard against French landings in Scotland in 1559, while diplomatic efforts were made to negotiate sending an English army to aid the Scottish Protestants. After a briefing at Gillingham, Wynter left Queenborough in the Lyon on 27 December, and sailed from the Lowestoft sea road on 14 January with 12 men-of-war followed by two supply ships, the Bull and the Saker. After the fleet was dispersed by a storm off Flamborough Head on 16 January, the damaged Swallow, Falcon, and Jerfalcon were left at Tynemouth, and the rest of the fleet passed Bamborough Castle to Berwick upon Tweed, where 600 hand gunners were embarked.

=== Wynter's fleet enters the Firth of Forth ===
The Duke of Norfolk, commander in the North, gave Wynter orders to hinder any French landings in the Firth of Forth. He was to avoid battle, pretending he came up-river by chance without any official commission. At Coldingham bay, Wynter paused to send a copy of his log, which survives, to London. He was observed by Lord John Stewart, Commendator of Coldingham, a half-brother of Mary, Queen of Scots. The Protestant party were pleased when the ships were sighted at the Isle of May. William Douglas wrote that their arrival was by God's work, for before they had no support.

Eight ships including the Antelope and Lyon carried on into the Firth of Forth towards the fortress Island of Inchkeith on 21 January 1560. Wynter's blockade was immediately effective in preventing communication by sea from Edinburgh to the French garrison at Dunbar Castle. Although he could not do as much as he wished because his small landing boats were lost in the storm, he captured two French ships loaded with armaments. At first, the French had thought that Wynter's fleet were French ships bringing more troops, and their response was to send these boats loaded with munition for Henri Cleutin who was advancing on St Andrews. Instead, Cleutin was forced to race back to Stirling overland, and William Kirkcaldy of Grange delayed him by cutting the bridge over the Devon at Tullibody.

On 24 January 1560, Wynter allowed the Scottish Snawdoun Herald John Patterson with the trumpet messenger James Drummond aboard the Lyon, who demanded to know his business in Scottish waters. As instructed, Wynter told Snawdoun he had been bound for Berwick, and came into the Forth expecting "friendly entertainment" as the nations were at peace. As the French forts had fired on him, and he had heard of the political situation in Scotland, he had taken it upon himself to aid the Lords of the Congregation against the "wicked practices of the French," and so Elizabeth I of England knew nothing of it. Patterson and Drummond visited the English fleet four times.

Wynter's actions and speech to the Herald were reported to the Privy Council of England. To maintain the pretence he was instructed not to bring any ships he captured to England, but to berth them in the friendly harbours of Dundee and St Andrews which were in Protestant hands. As late as 16 February 1560, Norfolk sent the Chester Herald, William Flower, to Mary of Guise who declared the English fleet had arrived in the Firth by accident. She claimed that the Lords of the Congregation had revealed advance knowledge of Wynter's mission and were in communication with him. Flower replied that he had no knowledge of ships or letters. While this ineffectual diplomacy continued, the Lords of the Congregation concluded the Treaty of Berwick with Norfolk, which set conditions for English intervention. Some of the sons of the leading Protestants were given up as hostages to guarantee the treaty, and these boys were delivered to Wynter.

=== De Seure's complaint ===
The French ambassador in London, Michel de Seure, made complaints about Wynter's activity against French shipping. De Seure wrote of attacks on three ships of Mary of Guise, one carrying artillery to St Andrews, and two smaller boats guarding the Forth captained by Frenchmen. Wynter's Lyon had captured a Breton ship, the Marie Babuilduc which had carried a cargo of grain belonging to the King of France, and this was used as transport by Wynter. De Seure wrote to French diplomats in March, describing Elizabeth's pretence that Wynter would be punished.

=== Siege of Leith ===
Wynter continued to harass shipping and then supported the English army brought in by the Treaty of Berwick to the Siege of Leith. He burnt seven ships under d'Elbouf; not only that, all supplies were cut off from France. He kept up a naval bombardment of the town. On Saturday, 7 May 1560, Wynter waited for a signal to sail up the Water of Leith and land 500 men on the quayside called the Shore, but the signal never came as the English assault on the walls had failed.

The siege was ended by the negotiation of the Treaty of Edinburgh of 1560 which was the effective conclusion to the 'Auld Alliance'. Lord Burghley reported to the Privy Council that all spoke well of Wynter's conduct and he "was to be cherished." In July, Wynter discussed his fleet's return to Gillingham for re-fitting in dry-dock, but "the most expert officers of the Admiralty" sent the fleet to active service at Portsmouth, on their way escorting the ships evacuating the French army from Scotland to Calais.

== Peacetime and projects ==
Between 1560 and 1562, Winter purchased Lydney Manor in Gloucestershire as his residence. The estate included the manors of Lydney Warwick, Lydney Shrewsbury, and Purton.

Wynter helped save the Palace of the Bishop of London from fire by advising the Mayor of London, William Harpur to demolish the roof of the adjacent north aisle of St Paul's Cathedral when the church caught fire after being struck by lightning on 4 June 1561.

In September 1561, Wynter and Benjamin Gonson joined with Sir William Garrard and the merchants Anthony Hickman and Edward Castelyn to propose a voyage to Guinea to be led by John Lok (who had conducted the "first Guinea voyage" in 1554). The articles were for a map and survey of the Guinea coast, its sea inlets and havens, its hinterland and resources, with a commission to identify a suitable site for a fortress in the king of Habaan's country. News was to be sought of the merchants left in Benin during the previous voyage. In December Lok declined the proposal, partly because the Minion was in poor condition, but Garrard, Hickman and Castelyn next combined with Sir William Chester and Thomas Lodge to promote the Guinea voyage of 1562–63.

In July 1562 the French diplomat Paul de Foix reported rumours that Elizabeth I was preparing an invasion force in support of French Huguenots, with 12 ships under Wynter's command. In 1563, William served in the fleet off Le Havre. In 1570, he was sent by Elizabeth I to escort Anna of Austria on her sea journey from the Netherlands to marry Philip II of Spain.

== Rivalry in office ==
Wynter's brother George Wynter had been appointed Clerk of the Ships in November 1560 and held the position until his death in 1581. John Hawkins (who married a daughter of Benjamin Gonson's in 1559) was appointed to succeed George Wynter in June 1567, but did not do so. In 1572 Hawkins and George Wynter were among those commissioned to clear the seas of pirates and freebooters. In the following year William Wynter was knighted at Gillingham, but in 1577 he was passed over for the office of Treasurer of the Navy in favour of Hawkins, a promotion which would have doubled his income. Hawkins immediately made for himself an enemy of Sir William Wynter, presenting Lord Burghley with detailed accusations of mismanagement and corruption throughout the Admiralty, and portraying Wynter as the senior figure responsible. Both Hawkins and Wynter held their positions, and Sir William and his brother George received handsome returns on their investment in Sir Francis Drake's voyage of 1577. Although there were periods of apparent reconciliation, Wynter later supported charges of dishonesty against Hawkins, and wrote critically of him to William Cecil.

In c. 1575 the translator Richard Eden (died 1576) dedicated to Sir William Wynter his translation of the Latin Treatise of Continuall Motions (compiled from Petrus Peregrinus de Maricourt and Giambattista Benedetti by Jean Taisnier and published in Cologne in 1562), made at the suggestion of his friend Richard Jugge (died 1577), Printer to the Queen's Majesty. Claiming long acquaintance with Wynter, in the dedicatory preface Eden remarked that he sought

"to consecrate and dedicate the same to some worthie personage, whose fame, aucthoritie, and dignitie, myght defende them from the evyll tongues of such as are more redie rather to reproove other mens dooynges, then to doo any good them selves. And therfore (gentle Maister Wynter) knowing your aucthoritie and fame in well deservyng, and honorable service unto your Prince and Countrey, to be suche as all men thynke so well of, and so greatlye esteeme, to whom (rather then unto you) may I dedicate this booke of Navigation?"

In 1578 William Bourne dedicated to Wynter his book called The Treasure for Traveilers, a work concerning the use of the astrolabe and other instruments, the calculation of distances by latitude and longitude, the measuring of superficies and solid bodies, the measuring of the weight of ships in the water, and considerations of the natural causes affecting coastal topography and land formation. His dedicatory letter, addressing Wynter, remarked, "no person in this Land hath such great iudgement and knowledge in martial affaires by Sea, both touching the shipping, for that purpose, and also for the provision for the same, as your woorship hath: and as for your courage, valiantnesse, and wisdome, which is not unknowne unto the worlde..."

== Operations off Ireland ==
In 1571, during the first of the Desmond Rebellions one of Wynter's ships was seized at Kinsale by James Fitzmaurice Fitzgerald, the Irish rebel.

In 1579, he commanded the squadron off Smerwick in Ireland, cutting off the sea routes and seizing the ships of the papal invasion force, which was landed by Fitzmaurice in the company of Nicholas Sanders launching the Second Desmond Rebellion; during this campaign, he assisted in the siege of Carrigafoyle Castle.

== Spanish Armada ==
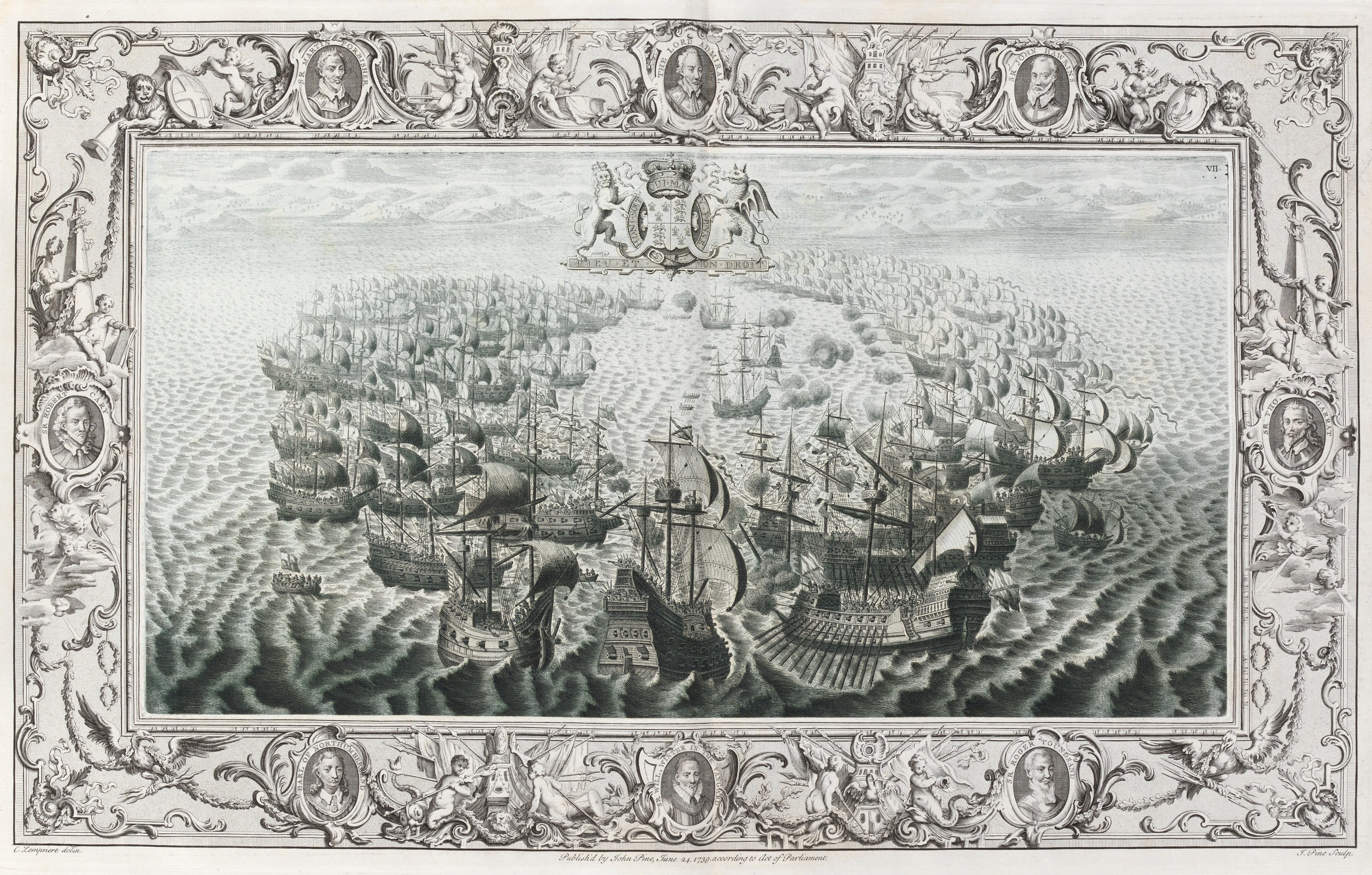
Engraving by J Pine (1739) after the lost tapestries of the Armada, with medallion portrait of Sir William Wynter in the border, lower centre

On 21 July 1588, Sir Francis Drake wrote, at the request of Lord Howard, to notify Lord Henry Seymour and Sir William Wynter of the approach of the Spanish Armada. Wynter joined the main fleet of Lord Howard off Calais and proposed the fire-ship plan to drive the Spaniards from their anchorage. He took part in the battle off Gravelines on 29 July, which was the only time in his career when he had hard fighting. During the engagement, he received a severe blow on the hip when a demi-cannon toppled over. It is said that he was the only one to have understood the completeness of the navy's defence, assessing from his experience at Leith that the enemy army's transport would require 300 ships, while Howard and Drake thought that the invasion of England might still take place despite the naval repulse delivered to the armada.

His portrait was included in the Armada Tapestries.

== Offices held ==
Wynter held command in numerous expeditions

- Served on expeditions against Scotland (1544, 1547)
- Channel Fleet (1545)
- Keeper of the Deptford Storehouse (1546)
- Surveyor and Rigger of the Navy (8 July 1549 to 11 July 1589)
- Master of Naval Ordnance (1557–1589)
- Admiral in all seagoing expeditions (1557–88)
- JP, Gloucestershire (from c. 1564)
- Commissioner of Sewers, Kent, Surrey, and Sussex (1564)
- Mission to the Prince of Orange (1576)
- Constable of St Briavels Castle and Keeper of woods in the Forest of Dean, life time patent (1577)
- Steward and Receiver, Duchy of Lancaster lands in Gloucestershire and Herefordshire (from 1580)

Sir William Wynter died on 20 February 1589, aged 68: his will was proved in the following March. He requested to be buried in the chapel which he had recently made at Lydney church. A Latin verse eulogy by William Patten was published in that year. His wife had pre-deceased him, but her mother, Dame Mary Judd, survived until 1602.

== Issue ==
Wynter married Mary Langton, daughter of Thomas and Mary Langton. Dame Mary Wynter died 4 November 1573, at the Wynters' house in Seething Lane in the City of London, and was buried at Lydney, Gloucestershire. They had issue:

- Edward Wynter (1560–1619), M.P. He married in 1595 Lady Anne Somerset, daughter of Edward Somerset, 4th Earl of Worcester. They were the parents of
  - John Winter, an active royalist during the English Civil War.
- Nicholas Wynter, second son (died fighting Spaniards)
- James Wynter, third son (died young)
- Captain William Wynter, fourth son
- Maria Wynter, married Thomas Baynham of Clearwell, Gloucestershire.
- Elizabeth Wynter, married Sir William Morgan (of Tredegar), son of Thomas Morgan of Machen, Monmouthshire, and wife Elizabeth Bodenham.
- Eleanor Wynter, married George Huntley of Gloucestershire.
- Jane Wynter
- Sarah Wynter
