= Keeper of the Storehouses =

Office of the Keeper of the Storehouses
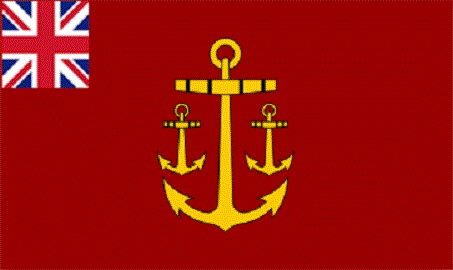
- Navy Office
- Member of: Council of the Marine
- Reports to: Lieutenant of the Admiralty
- Nominator: Lord Admiral of England
- Appointer: Monarch of England; Subject to formal approval by the Queen-in-Council
- Term length: Not fixed (usually held for life)
- Inaugural holder: Vice-Admiral, Sir William Gonson
- Formation: 1524-1560

The Keeper of the Storehouses and formally known as the Keeper of the King's Storehouses was an English Navy appointment created in 1524 the office holder was a principal member of the Council of the Marine from 1546 until the post was abolished and his duties assumed by the Treasurer of the Navy in 1560. He was responsible for the storing and supply of naval stores at naval dockyards for the navy.

== History ==
The office of Keeper of the Storehouses came into being in 1524 following the death John Hopton who simultaneously held the titles of Keeper of the Storehouses at Deptford Dockyard and Erith Dockyard and Clerk Comptroller of the Navy from 1512 to 1524 when his offices were separated. Initially it was one of the individual offices of the Clerks of the Kings Marine until April 1546 when the office holder became a member of Council of the Marine. The office existed until 1560 when it was abolished and its duties were assumed by the Treasurer of the Navy.

== Office holders ==
Included:

- Captain, William Gonson, 1524–1544.
- Captain John Wynter, 1544–1545
- Richard Howlett, 1545–1548.
- Vice-Admiral, William Holstocke, 1548-1560 (office is merged with Treasurer of the Navy)

== Sources ==
1. Childs, David (2009). Tudor Sea Power: The Foundation of Greatness. Barnsley, England: Seaforth Publishing. ISBN 9781473819924.
2. National Archives UK: Accounts as Master of Naval Ordnance: D421: 1561–69,
3. Rodger, N.A.M. (1997). "Council of the Marine: Administration 1509 to 1574". The safeguard of the sea : a naval history of Britain. Vol 1., 660–1649. London, England: Penguin. ISBN 9780140297249.
