= Master of Naval Ordnance =

Office of the Master of Naval Ordnance
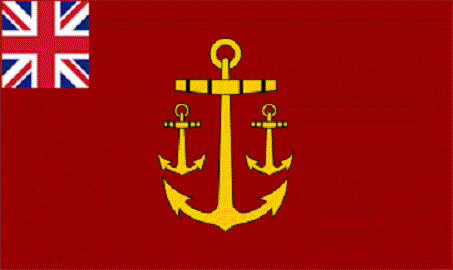
- Navy Office
- Member of: Council of the Marine; Office of Ordnance
- Reports to: Lieutenant of the Admiralty
- Nominator: Lord Admiral of England
- Appointer: Monarch of England; Subject to formal approval by the Queen-in-Council
- Term length: Not fixed (usually held for life)
- Inaugural holder: Vice-Admiral Sir William Woodhouse
- Formation: 1546-1589

The Master of Naval Ordnance was an English Navy appointment created in 1546 the office holder was one of the Chief Officers of the Admiralty and a member of the Council of the Marine and a member of the Office of Ordnance until the post was abolished in 1589. He was responsible for the supply of naval ordnance for the navy.

== History ==
The office of Master of Naval Ordnance was a specific post within Office of Ordnance established in 1546 during the reign of Henry VIII of England. He was initially assigned to the Council of the Marine acted as a liaison between both. The post holder was responsible for the supply of naval ordnance for the navy. The post existed until 1589 when it was abolished.

== Office holders ==
Included:

1. Vice-Admiral, Sir William Woodhouse, MP, 1546–1552
2. Vice Admiral Sir Thomas Wyndham, 1st Lord Felbrigg, 1552–1553
3. Vice Admiral Sir William Wynter, 1557-1589 (also Surveyor and Rigger of the Navy)

== Sources ==
1. Childs, David (2009). Tudor Sea Power: The Foundation of Greatness. Barnsley, England: Seaforth Publishing. ISBN 9781473819924.
2. National Archives UK: Accounts as Master of Naval Ordnance: D421: 1561–69,
3. Rodger, N.A.M. (1997). "Council of the Marine: Administration 1509 to 1574". The safeguard of the sea : a naval history of Britain. Vol 1., 660–1649. London, England: Penguin. ISBN 9780140297249.
