= Benjamin Gonson =

Navy surveyor

- Born: 1525; Parish of St Dunstan-in-the-East, London, England
- Died: 1577 (aged 51–52); London, England
- Burial place: St Dunstan-in-the-East
- Military career
- Allegiance: England
- Branch: Royal Navy
- Service years: 1540–1577
- Commands: Surveyor and Rigger of the Navy; Treasurer of the Navy

Benjamin Gonson (c. 1525–1577) was an English Naval Administrator, and the first Surveyor of the Royal Navy. He was a founding member of England's Navy Board during the Tudor period.

== Career ==
Benjamin Gonson began his career as a private shipwright. He began his government work when he was appointed to the new Council of the Marine established by Henry VIII on 24 April 1546 as Surveyor and Rigger of the Navy. He held this post until 1549 when he was succeeded by Admiral William Wynter. On 8 April 1549 he was appointed Treasurer of Marine Causes which he first held alone (until 18 November 1577), and then jointly with Admiral John Hawkins (until 26 November 1577).

== Personal ==
The son of Vice-Admiral William Gonson, he followed his father into government service. He married Ursula, daughter of Anthony Hussey (an Admiralty Court judge under Henry VIII) on 8 April 1546. He had fourteen children with Ursula all born between the years 1547–67; he died in December 1577.

== See also ==
- Admiralty in the 16th century
- Navy Board
- Tudor Navy
- William Gonson
