= Erith Dockyard =

HM Dockyard Erith
- Erith, Kent in England

Site information
- Operator: English Navy

Location
- Coordinates: 51°28′57″N 0°10′54″E

Site history
- In use: 1512-1521

Erith Dockyard located at Erith, Kent, England was an early Tudor naval dockyard operated by the English Navy that opened in 1512. Due to persistent flooding the dockyard closed in 1521.

== History ==
The name Erith comes from the Saxon ‘Earhyth’ meaning muddy landing place. It was traditionally a small port along the River Thames. In the 16th century King Henry VIII established a naval dockyard in Erith. It became a trading hub, as spices and cotton from the East Indies were delivered onto London. A naval storehouse was constructed at Erith in 1512 that was managed by the Keeper of the Kings Storehouses who was one of the Clerks of the Kings Marine a Tudor (naval administrator). Erith Dockyard was used as an advance base for routine maintenance before ships were transferred to Deptford Dockyard. It closed due to persistent flooding in 1521. However, according to naval historian Nicholas A. M. Rodger although Erith dockyard closed it was an important center of naval administration of the English Navy from 1514 into the 1540s.

== Administration of the dockyard and other key officials ==
The Master Shipwright was usually the key official at the Royal Navy dockyards until the introduction of resident commissioners by the Navy Board after which he became deputy to the resident commissioner. In 1832 the post of commissioner was usually replaced by the post of admiral superintendent.

=== Keeper of Kings Storehouse, Erith ===
Post holders included:

1. 1512–1524, John Hopton (also Keeper at Deptford Dockyard)
2. 1524–1537, William Gonson (ditto)

== Ships fitted out at the dockyard ==
Included:

1. HMS Trinity Sovereign, also known as HMS Sovereign, an English warship in service built in 1488 and listed until 1521.
2. HMS Henry Grace à Dieu

== Sources ==
1. Childs, David (March 2010). Tudor sea power : the foundation of greatness. Barnsley, England: Seaforth Pub. ISBN 9781848320314.
2. Oppenheim, Michael (1896). A history of the administration of the royal navy and of merchant shipping in relation to the navy, from MDIX to MDCLX, with an introduction treating of the preceding period. London, New York, J. Lane.
3. Rodger, N. A. M. (1997). The safeguard of the sea : a naval history of Britain. Vol 1., 660–1649. London, England: Penguin. ISBN 9780140297249.
