= Treasurer of the Navy Act 1830 =

Act of the Parliament of the United Kingdom

- Act of Parliament
- Parliament of the United Kingdom
- Long title: An Act to consolidate and amend the several Acts relating to the Office of Treasurer of His Majesty's Navy.
- Citation: 11 Geo. 4 & 1 Will. 4. c. 42
- Territorial extent: United Kingdom

Dates
- Royal assent: 16 July 1830
- Commencement: 31 December 1830 (Note: Section 1.)
- Repealed: 16 July 1874
Other legislation
Repeals/revokes	See § Repealed enactments
Repealed by	Statute Law Revision Act 1874
Relates to	Pay of the Navy Act 1830; Paymaster General Act 1835

Status: Repealed

Text of statute as originally enacted

The Treasurer of the Navy Act 1830 (11 Geo. 4 & 1 Will. 4. c. 42) was an act of the Parliament of the United Kingdom that consolidated and amended enactments relating to the office of Treasurer of the Navy.

== Provisions ==
=== Repealed enactments ===
Section 1 of the act repealed 5 enactments, listed in that section, with effect from 31 December 1830. The repeal did not affect anything done, or any offence committed, before that date under the repealed acts, and did not revive the provisions of any acts which those repealed acts had themselves altered or repealed.

Citation	Short title	Description	Extent of repeal
25 G. 3. c. 31	Treasurer of the Navy Act 1785	An Act passed in the Twenty-fifth Year of the Reign of His late Majesty King George the Third, intituled An Act for better regulating the Office of the Treasurer of His Majesty's Navy.	The whole act.
47 G. 3. c. 56	Treasurer of the Navy Act 1807	An Act passed in the Forty-seventh Year of His said late Majesty, intituled An Act for the further regulating the Office of Treasurer of His Majesty's Navy.	The whole act.
48 G. 3. c. 8	Treasurer of the Navy Act 1808	An Act passed in the Forty-eighth Year of His said late Majesty, intituled An Act to amend an Act of the Twenty-fifth Year of His present Majesty, for better regulating the Office of the Treasurer of His Majesty's Navy.	The whole act.
57 G. 3. c. 112	Office of Treasurer of the Navy Act 1817	An Act passed in the Fifty-seventh Year of the Reign of His said late Majesty, intituled An Act to amend an Act of the Twenty-fifth Year of the Reign of His present Majesty, for better regulating the Office of Treasurer of His Majesty's Navy, as far as respects the Mode of Applications for certain Services in the Victualling Department.	The whole act.
1 & 2 G. 4. c. 74	Treasurer of the Navy Act 1821	An Act passed in the First and Second Years of the Reign of His late Majesty King George the Fourth, intituled An Act to repeal an Act passed in the Fifty-seventh Year of His late Majesty King George the Third, for regulating Payments to the Treasurer of the Navy, under the Heads of Old Stores and Imprests, and to make other Provisions in lieu thereof.	The whole act.

== Subsequent developments ==
The office of Treasurer of the Navy was abolished in 1835 under powers conferred by the Paymaster General Act 1835 (5 & 6 Will. 4. c. 35), which authorised the Crown to consolidate the offices of Paymaster General, Paymaster and Treasurer of Chelsea Hospital, Treasurer of the Navy, and Treasurer of the Ordnance into a single office; its duties passed to the Paymaster General.

The whole act was repealed by section 1 of, and the schedule to, the Statute Law Revision Act 1874 (37 & 38 Vict. c. 35), which came into force on 16 July 1874.
