= William Woodhouse (naval officer) =

Member of the Parliament of England (c. 1517–1564)

Sir William Woodhouse
- Born: c. 1517; Waxham, Norfolk, England
- Died: 22 November 1564
- Military career
- Allegiance: Kingdom of England
- Branch: Royal Navy
- Service years: 1533–1564
- Rank: Lieutenant Admiral
- Commands: HMS Primrose; Keeper of Queenborough Castle; Master of Naval Ordnance; Vice-Admiral in the Channel; Vice-Admiral of Suffolk; Vice-Admiral of Norfolk; Lieutenant of the Admiralty

Lieutenant Admiral Sir William Woodhouse (by 1517 – 22 November 1564) was an English naval commander and administrator who rose to the rank of Lieutenant of the Admiralty and was head of the Council of the Marine later called the Navy Board. He also served as a Member of Parliament of the Parliament of England from 1545 to 1564. He was prominent during an important time of the Navy Royal's development in the later half of the Tudor period.

== Naval career ==
Woodhouse was a naval commander and administrator who served under Henry VIII of England. He went to sea early in life and his career advanced through service to the King. He was granted offices in Lynn Norfolk, and was appointed Escheator for Norfolk and Suffolk from 1538 to 1539. This was followed by his being appointed bailiff of the manor of Gaywood in 1540. In September 1542 he was appointed Captain of HMS Primrose until January 1543.

In February 1543 he was appointed admiral of four ships in the North Sea. In November 1543 he took charge of 10 ships stationed at Portsmouth with the intention of attacking French fishing waters. Appointed Vice-Admiral of the Fleet of the Earl of Hertford's expedition to Scotland in early 1544, he was knighted in Leith, Scotland on 13 May 1544. He was next appointed Vice-Admiral in the Channel and Vice-Admiral at Boulogne from July to November 1544 serving under Admiral Sir Thomas Seymour. In April 1546 he was appointed a member of the Council of the Marine and made Master of Naval Ordnance from 1546 to 1552. His next appointment came in 1552 when he was given the office of the Keeper of Queenborough Castle which he held until 1553.

In December 1546 he was appointed head of the Council of the Marine as Lieutenant of the Admiralty until 1564. In 1554 he was appointed as both Vice-Admiral of Suffolk and Vice-Admiral of Norfolk until 1564. In 1557 he was a commander with John Clere of a fleet sent against Scotland. Clere died fighting at Kirkwall.

In October 1558 he was appointed for a second time Vice-Admiral in the Channel until January 1559. He remained as head of the Council of the Marine until 22 November 1564 when he died in office. The post of Lieutenant of the Admiralty then fell into abeyance until 1604.

== Political career ==
Woodhouse was also served as a Member of the Parliament of England elected for Great Yarmouth from 1545 to 1553, for Norfolk in 1558, Norwich from 1559 to 1563, and Norfolk again from 1563 to his death in 1564. He is described as "of Hickling, Norfolk".

== Family ==
This family of the Woodhouses was a distinct family from that of the Woodhouses of Kimberley and the later Earls of Kimberley, and bore, for their arms, quarterly, azure, and ermine, in the first quarter a leopard's head, or; which arms belong to the family of Power, and Francis Blomefield found these Woodhouses to be formerly styled Woodhouse, alias Power.

Sir William Woodhouse was the younger son of John Woodhouse of Waxhame and his wife Alice, daughter of William Croftes of Wyston in Norfolk. His elder brother was Vice-Admiral Sir Thomas Woodhouse.

Woodhouse married firstly Anne, daughter of Henry Repps of Thorpe Market in Norfolk, and had:

- Thomas Woodhouse of Hickling, Norfolk, ob. s.p. who married Anne, daughter and heiress of John Wootton of Tuddenham in Norfolk. After his death Anne remarried firstly to Henry Reppes of Mendham, Suffolk, his maternal uncle, the widower of Bess Holland. Anne's third and final marriage was to Bassingbourne Gawdy (d. 1590)
- Sir Henry Woodhouse, who married Anne, daughter of Sir Nicholas Bacon, knight, Lord Keeper
- Mary Woodhouse, who married Rafe Shelton of Shelton in Norfolk, son and heir of Sir John Shelton by his wife Margaret, the daughter of Henry Parker, 10th Baron Morley, and the sister of Jane Parker, Lady Rochford
- Ann Woodhouse, who married Sir William Heydon, son and heir of Sir Christopher Heydon of Baconsthorpe Castle in Norfolk. Their children included Christopher Heydon (1561–1623).

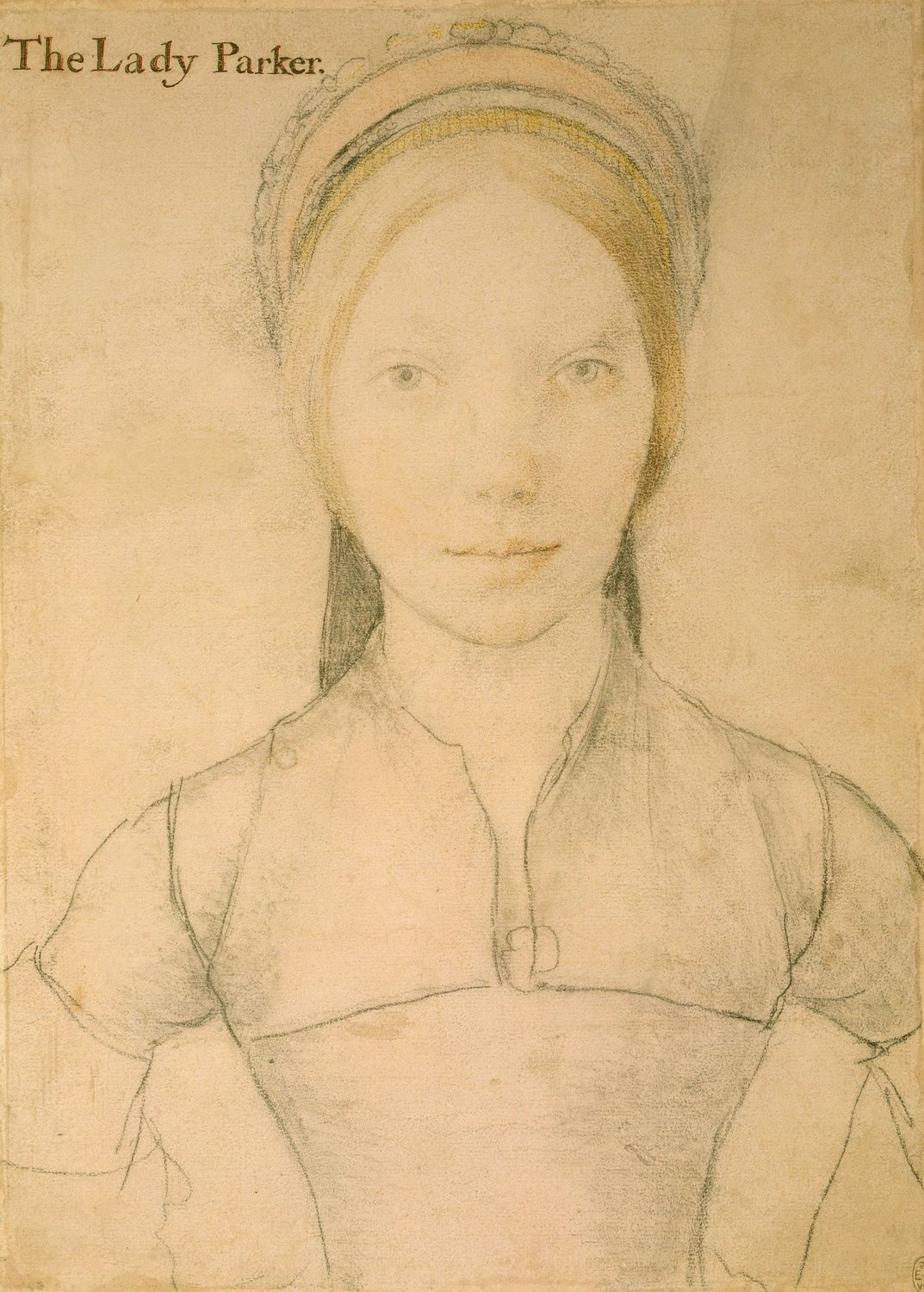
The Lady Parker. Possibly Elizabeth Calthorpe, the first cousin of Anne Boleyn

He married secondly Elizabeth, daughter and heiress of Sir Philip Calthorpe, knight, by Amata Boleyn, the daughter of William Boleyn and the aunt of Anne Boleyn, making Elizabeth the first cousin of Anne Boleyn. Elizabeth was the widow of Sir Henry Parker, knight, the son and heir of Henry Parker, 10th Baron Morley, first cousin of Sir William's son-in-law Rafe Shelton, the husband of his daughter Mary. After Sir William's death, Elizabeth remarried to Sir Drue Drury, her third marriage.

Children of Sir William Woodhouse and Elizabeth Calthorpe:

- Thomas Woodhouse
- William Woodhouse
- Elizabeth Woodhouse

== Bibliography ==
1. Bindoff, Stanley Thomas (1982). The House of Commons, 1509-1558: History of Parliament Trust. Woodbridge, England: Boydell & Brewer. ISBN 9780436042829.
2. "Woodhouse, Sir William (by 1517-64), of Hickling, Norf". The History of Parliament. History of Parliament Trust.
