= William Gonson =

Naval Judge and Naval Administrator of the English Royal Navy (1482–1544)

Vice-Admiral Sir William Gonson
- Born: 1482; Melton Mowbray, Leicestershire, England
- Died: 1544 (aged 61–62); London, England
- Burial place: St Dunstan-in-the-East
- Military career
- Allegiance: England
- Branch: Royal Navy
- Service years: 1513–1544
- Rank: Vice-Admiral
- Commands: Vice-Admiral of Norfolk; Vice-Admiral of Suffolk; Clerk of Marine Causes; Treasurer of the Navy; Keeper of the Storehouses; Captain Mary Grace

Vice-Admiral Sir William Gonson (1482–1544), was a Naval Judge and Naval Administrator of the English Royal Navy who served under King Henry VIII.

== Biography ==
=== Career ===
During the Tudor Period William Gonson's early career was as a private Merchant and Shipbuilder in the Royal Dockyards before he began his naval career. He was given command of Mary Grace in April 1513 as captain. In 1523 he was appointed Clerk of Marine Causes, which he held until 1533. In 1524 he was also appointed Paymaster or Treasurer of the Navy, holding until 1544. William was a naval administrator of the English navy for over twenty years: he also held the title of Keeper of the Storehouses at Erith Dockyard and Deptford Dockyard from 1524 to 1537. In effect he exercised together the responsibilities later distributed among three principal officers of the Council of the Marine. In 1536 he was appointed by Henry VIII to be Vice-Admiral of Norfolk and Suffolk. William eventually fell from grace, and he committed suicide in 1544, leaving the navy disorganized. It took two years for Henry to reorganize, control and develop what was afterwards known as 'The Navy Board'. Along with William of Wrotham and Sir Robert de Crull, he is probably to be reckoned one of the three most important administrators of naval affairs of the English Navy prior to 1546.

=== Personal ===
William Gonson was born in Melton Mowbray, Leicestershire in England, son of Christopher Gonson and Elizabeth Gonson (née: Trussell), and brother of Bartholomew Gonson. He married Bennett Walters and together they had six sons Anthony, Arthur, Benjamin, Christopher, David and Richard. They also had four daughters Avis, Elizabeth, Margaret and Thomasine.

His son Benjamin Gonson made a career in the English navy and became Treasurer of the Navy.

His son Sir David Gonson was a Knight of Malta. He was imprisoned in the Tower of London in 1540 and was condemned to death by an Act of Parliament in 1541 for denying the authority of the King in spiritual matters and refusing to recant his Catholic faith. He was hanged, drawn and quartered at St Thomas' Waterings, Southwark on 12 July 1541. Pope Pius XI declared him Blessed on 15 December 1929.

William Gonson was buried in the church of St Dunstan-in-the-East, under the terms of an agreement made by him with the parson and churchwardens four years previously.
