= Surveyor of the Navy =

British military office

Office of the Surveyor of the Navy
- Ensign of the Royal Navy
- Department of the Admiralty
- Member of: Navy Board (1546-1832)
- Reports to: First Lord of the Admiralty
- Nominator: First Lord of the Admiralty
- Appointer: Prime Minister; Subject to formal approval by the Queen-in-Council
- Term length: Not fixed (typically 3–7 years)
- Inaugural holder: Benjamin Gonson
- Formation: 1546-1869

The Surveyor of the Navy, originally known as Surveyor and Rigger of the Navy, held overall responsibility for the design of British warships from 1745. He was a principal commissioner and member of the Navy Board from the inauguration of that body in 1546 until the Board was abolished in 1832 and its operational functions taken over by the Board of Admiralty. In 1860 the office was renamed Controller of The Navy until 1869, when the office was merged with that of the Third Naval Lord. The Department of the Surveyor of the Navy was replaced by the Department of the Director of Dockyards in 1872.

== History ==
The office was established in 1546 under Henry VIII when the post holder was styled as Surveyor and Rigger of the Navy until 1611. Until 1745 the actual design work for warships built at each Royal Dockyard was primarily the responsibility of the individual Master Shipwright at that Royal Dockyard. For vessels built by commercial contract (limited to wartime periods, when the Royal Dockyards could not cope with the volume of work), the Surveyor's office drew the designs to which the private shipbuilders were required to build the vessels. From 1745 design responsibility was centred in the Surveyor's office, with the Master Shipwrights in the Dockyard responsible for implementation. In 1832 the Navy Board was abolished and all of its functions were brought under the sole control of the Board of Admiralty.

Before 1832, the building, fitting out and repairing of HM ships were the responsibility of the Navy Board. Originally the principal officer most involved was the Surveyor of the Navy, who estimated annual stores requirements, inspected ships' stores and kept the Fleet's store-books and repair-bills. In the eighteenth century his duties passed increasingly to the Comptroller of the Navy. The office of Surveyor did not disappear, however, and after 1832, when the office of Comptroller was abolished, the Surveyor was made the officer responsible for the material departments. In 1860 the name of the office was changed to Controller of the Navy until 1869, when the office was amalgamated with the office of the Third Naval Lord.

== Office holders ==
=== Surveyor and Riggers of the Navy (1546–1611) ===
In date order (note that the post of Surveyor was frequently shared, which enabled the Admiralty to have competitive designs prepared for evaluation):

Surveyors and Riggers of the Navy

- Vice-Admiral, Sir Thomas Spert, 1524–1541
- Benjamin Gonson 24 April 1546 – June 1549.
- Admiral Sir William Wynter 8 July 1549.
- Rear-Admiral Sir Henry Palmer 11 July 1589.
- Sir John Trevor 20 December 1598 –1611.

=== Surveyors of the Navy (1611–1859) ===
- Sir Richard Bingley 1611–1619.
- Thomas Norreys 12 February 1619 – 1625.
- Joshua Downing 1625–1628.
- Sir Thomas Aylesbury 1628.
- Kenrick Edisbury 19 December 1632.
- Vice-Admiral William Batten 26 September 1638.
- John Holland 16 February 1649.
- George Payler 1654.
- Sir William Batten 20 June 1660.
- Thomas Middleton 25 November 1667.
- Sir John Tippetts 5 September 1672.
- Edmund Dummer 9 August 1692.
- Daniel Furzer 22 September 1699.
- Daniel Furzer and William Lee (jointly) 19 October 1706.
- Daniel Furzer (alone) 16 November 1714.
- Jacob Ackworth 6 April 1715.
- Sir Jacob Ackworth and Joseph Allin (jointly) 11 July 1745.
- Joseph Allin (alone) 16 March 1749.
- Thomas Slade and William Bately (jointly) 4 September 1755.
- Thomas Slade and John Williams (jointly) 28 June 1765.
- John Williams (alone) 22 February 1771.
- Sir John Williams and Edward Hunt (jointly) 11 April 1778.
- Edward Hunt and John Henslow (jointly) 13 December 1784.
- John Henslow (alone) 7 December 1786.
- John Henslow and William Rule (jointly) 11 February 1793.
- Sir William Rule and Henry Peake (jointly) 20 June 1806.
- Joseph Tucker and Robert Seppings (jointly) 14 June 1813. (Seppings became Sir Robert Seppings from 20 February 1822.
- Sir Robert Seppings (alone) 1 March 1831.
- Sir William Symonds, 9 June 1832-October 1847
- Sir Baldwin Wake Walker 5 February 1848 – 1859.

=== Controllers of the Navy (1859-1869) ===
In 1859 the post of Surveyor of the Navy was changed to Controller of the Navy

- Rear-Admiral Sir Baldwin Wake Walker, 1859–1861
- Vice-Admiral Sir Robert Robinson, 1861–1869

In 1869 the post of Controller of the Navy was merged with the office of the Third Naval Lord

== Sources ==
- Childs, David (2009). Tudor Sea Power: The Foundation of Greatness. Seaforth Publishing. ISBN 9781473819924.
- Hamilton, Sir Richard Vesey (1896). Naval Administration: The Constitution, Character, and Functions of the Board of Admiralty, and of the Civil Departments it Directs. G. Bell and Sons. London.
- Lambert, Andrew D. (1991). The Last Sailing Battlefleet: Maintaining Naval Mastery 1815 - 1850. Conway Maritime Press. ISBN 0-85177-591-8.
- Lavery, Brian (1984). The Ship of the Line. Vol. 1: The Development of the Battlefleet 1650-1850. Naval Institute Press. ISBN 0-85177-252-8.
- Principal officers and commissioners, Office-Holders in Modern Britain: Volume 7: Navy Board Officials 1660-1832 (1978), pp. 18–25. URL: http://www.british-history.ac.uk/report.aspx?compid=16833.

== Attribution ==
This article contains text from this source http://discovery.nationalarchives.gov.uk/details/r/C712, which is available under the Open Government Licence v3.0. © Crown copyright.
