= John Hawkins (naval commander) =

English slave trader (1532–1595)

Admiral Sir John Hawkins
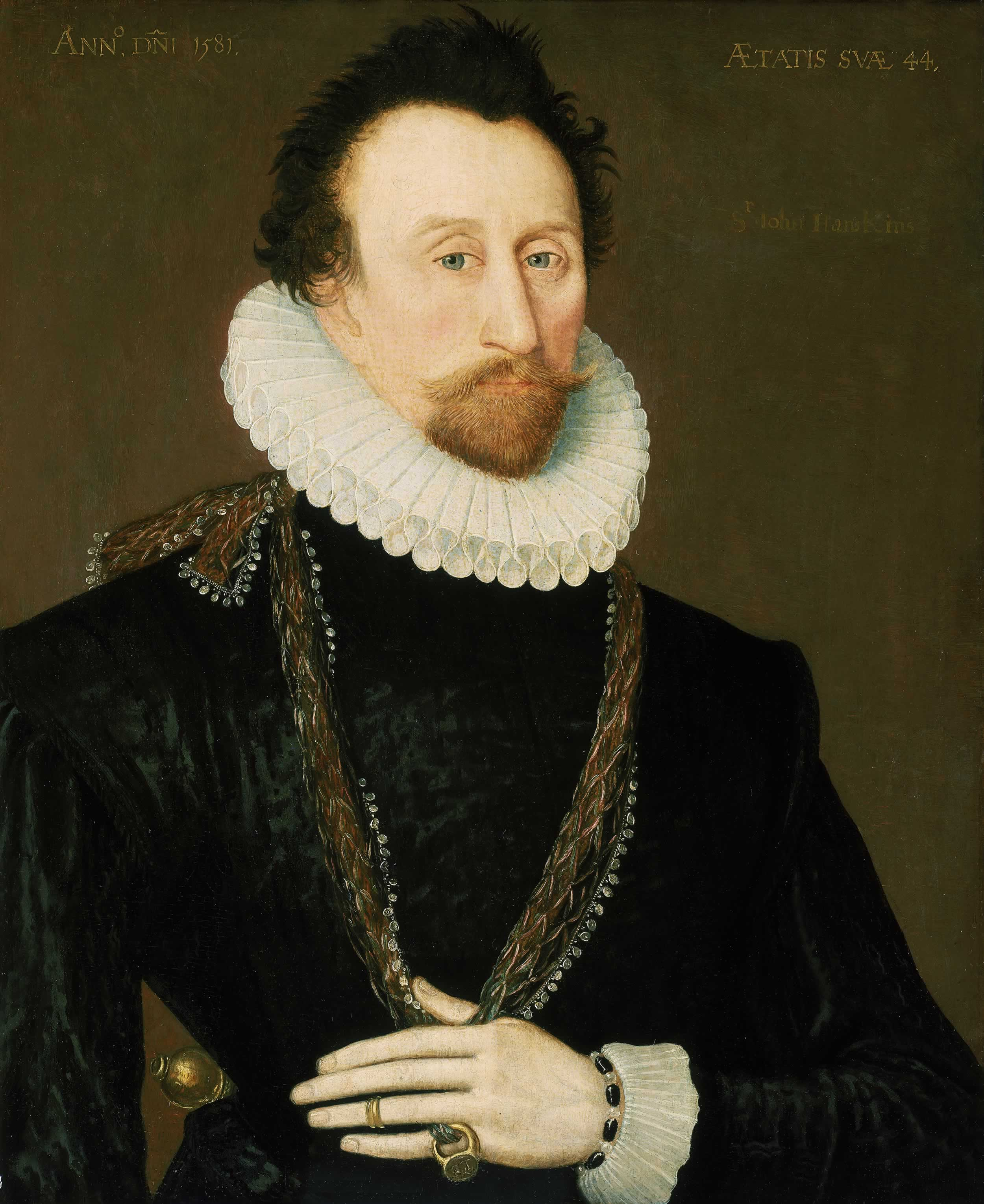
- Portrait of John Hawkins at the National Maritime Museum, London
- Born: 1532; Plymouth, England
- Died: 1595 (aged 62–63) off Puerto Rico, Spanish Main
- Children: Richard Hawkins (1562–1622)
- Military career
- Allegiance: England
- Branch: Royal Navy
- Service years: 1562–1595
- Commands: Treasurer of the Navy; Admiral of the Narrow Seas
- Conflicts: Spanish Armada; English Armada; Battle of San Juan de Ulúa

Admiral Sir John Hawkins (also spelled Hawkyns) (1532 – 1595) was an English naval commander, naval administrator, privateer, and slave trader. Hawkins pioneered, and was an early promoter of, English involvement in the Atlantic slave trade. He is considered to be the first English merchant to profit from the Triangle Trade, selling enslaved people from Africa to the Spanish colonies in the West Indies in the late 16th century.

In 1588, Hawkins served as a Vice-Admiral and fought in the victory over the Spanish Armada, for which he was knighted for gallantry. As Treasurer of the Navy, Hawkins became the chief architect of the Elizabethan Navy. He redesigned the navy so the ships were faster, more manoeuvrable and had more firepower.

Hawkins' son, Richard Hawkins, was captured by the Spanish. In response, along with his cousin Sir Francis Drake, he raised a fleet of ships to attack the Spanish in the West Indies. However, he died at sea during the expedition.

== Early years ==
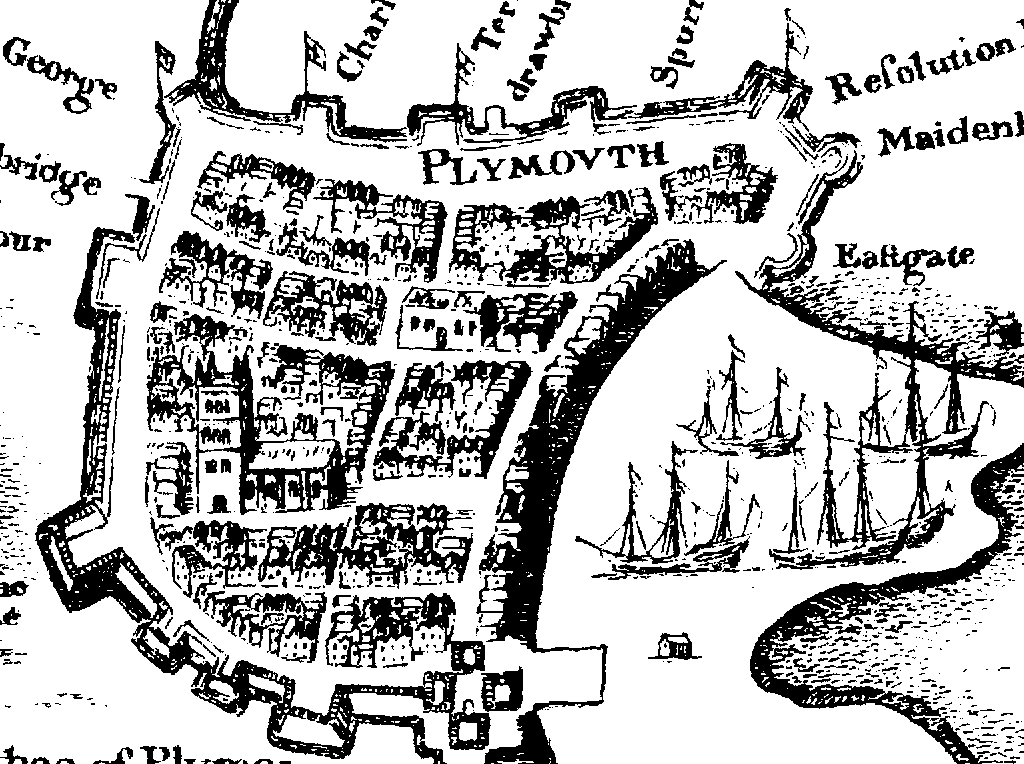
Hawkins was brought up in Plymouth, a well-defended naval port.

John Hawkins was born to a prominent family of ship builders and captains in the naval port of Plymouth in Devon. His exact date of birth is unknown, but was likely between November 1532 and March 1533. He was the second son of William Hawkins, who was the first Englishman to sail to Brazil, and Joan Trelawny, daughter and sole heiress of Roger Trelawny of Brighton, Cornwall. Sir Francis Drake, his second cousin, was brought up and lived in the same Protestant household as Hawkins.

Hawkins killed a man, a barber from Plymouth called White, before the age of 20. The coroner decided White was the antagonist, and Hawkins's father secured a royal pardon. He worked with his older brother William Hawkins in the shipping industry and in privateering. He is thought to have done some service for the ambassadors from Spain, who negotiated the marriage of Mary I of England and Philip II of Spain. Hawkins was known to have frequently referred to King Philip II as "my old master". The Spanish Castilianised his name where he was known as Juan Aquines.

Circa 1559, he dissolved his partnership with this brother, taking £10,000 from the business and moving to London. He married Katherine Gonson, daughter of Benjamin Gonson, a prominent Royal Navy administrator. He had one son, Richard Hawkins (born 1562). It is not known whether Katherine was Richard's mother or step-mother, because the marriage happened after his birth. Richard spoke fondly of Katherine in later life, consequently it is more likely she was his birth mother.

== First slave voyage (1562–1563) ==
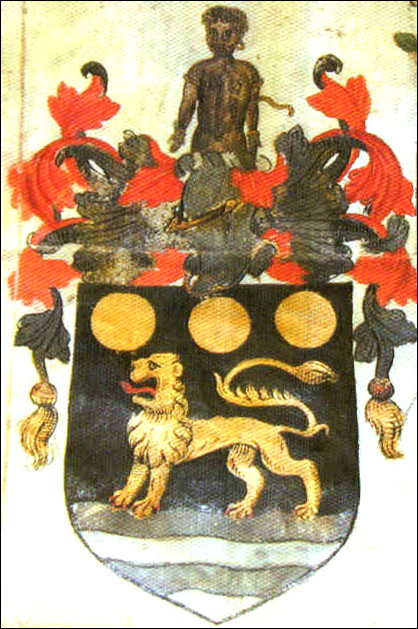
The coat of arms granted to John Hawkins by William Harvey, Clarenceux King of Arms, in 1565, showing an enslaved man.

Hawkins made voyages to the Canary Islands in the years leading up to 1561, and there he had learnt about the Atlantic slave trade – taking people from Guinea off the African coast and selling them in the Spanish Caribbean colonies. For his first slave voyage he formed a syndicate with Sir William Winter, Sir Lionel Duckett, Sir Thomas Lodge, his father-in-law Benjamin Gonson, and others to share the risk and cost of the voyage.

In 1562, he set sail with three ships (Saloman, Jonas, and Swallow) travelling down the African coast as far as Sierra Leone, he captured people and enslaved them as he went, taking around 300 people in total. From there he sailed to the Caribbean, he did not have permission from either Spain or Portugal to trade with their colonies so he sold his enslaved people in Isabella, Puerto de Plata and Monte Christi – places where the local authorities did not enforce government trade embargoes. The enslaved people were traded for pearls, hides and sugar.

The trade was so prosperous that, on his return to England, the College of Arms granted Hawkins a coat of arms which displays an enslaved male. Hawkins is widely considered to be the first English merchant to profit from the Triangle Trade; trading English goods for enslaved people in Africa, then selling those people in the Americas and buying foreign goods to be sold in England after the return journey.

== Second slave voyage (1564–1565) ==
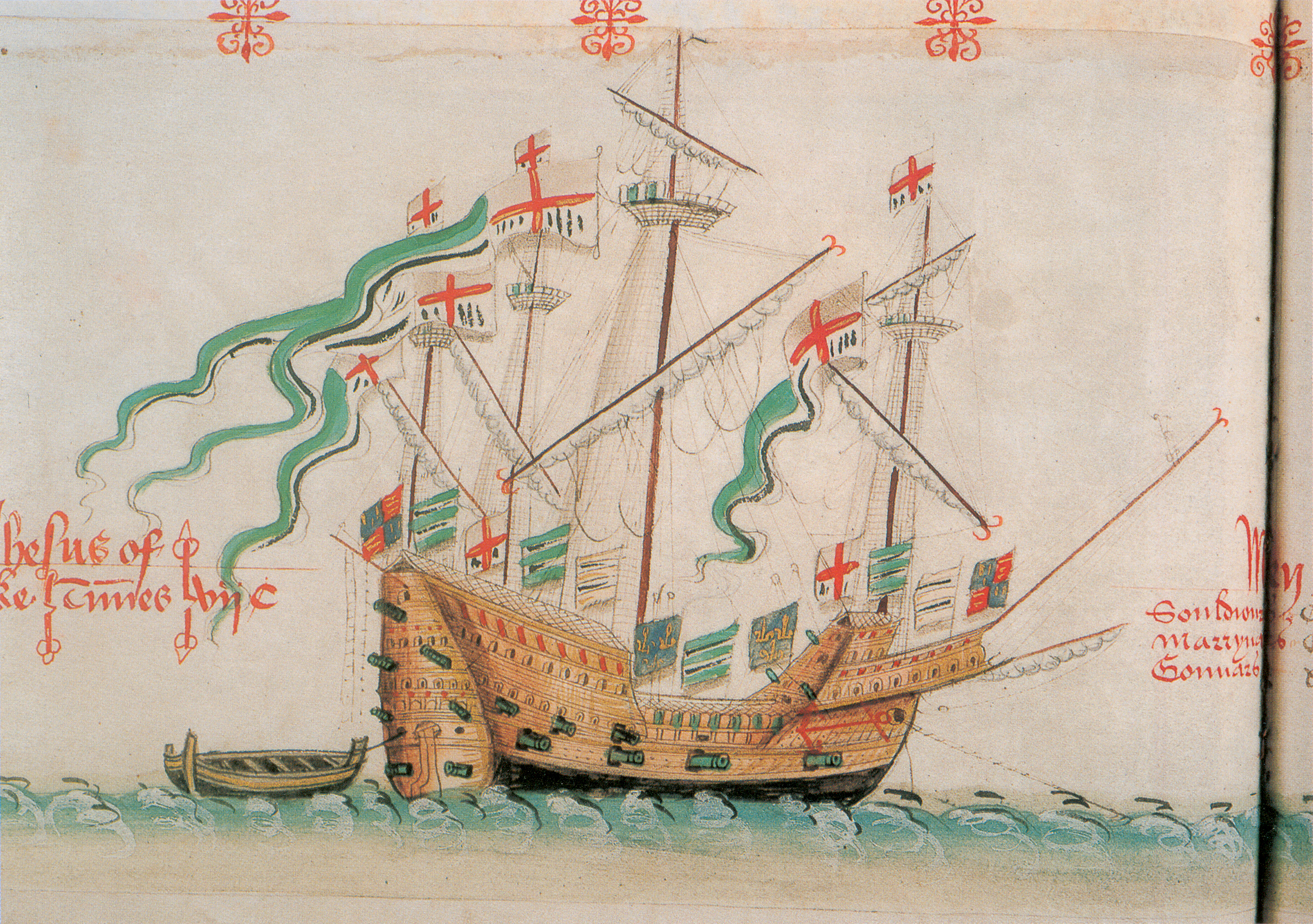
Hawkins chartered Queen Elizabeth I's Jesus of Lübeck.

Hawkins persuaded Queen Elizabeth I to back his second slave voyage and secured investors from her court, these included Robert Dudley, 1st Earl of Leicester and Edward Clinton, 1st Earl of Lincoln, with William Cecil, 1st Baron Burghley involved as a supervisor. The queen allowed Hawkins to charter one of her ships for the trip, the 700 Ton Jesus of Lübeck and for it to fly her flag, the Royal Standard. He set sail from Plymouth on 18 October 1564 with four vessels, Jesus of Lübeck, and 3 ships of his own. He took over 400 people from Africa and enslaved them, some he bought from the Portuguese, others he kidnapped directly by raiding the coast, he left Africa on 29 January 1565.

Upon arriving at Borburata on April 3, 1565, Hawkins was informed that he could not trade without an authorised license from the governor. He requested permission to sell some of the ‘lean and sicke Negreos’ to help alleviate the burden on his ships and enable the sick to recover. After days of negotiations, local officials finally consented to purchase a few enslaved individuals while waiting for the governor's decision. He then travelled to Rio de la Hacha where he used force to ensure he secured the deals he thought fair. He sold 300 enslaved people, clothing, linen and wine. He was paid in gold, silver and other precious items and took further orders to sell enslaved people on a future voyage.

After completing his business, Hawkins prepared to return to England. Needing water, he sailed to the French colony of Fort Caroline in Florida. Finding them in need, he traded his smallest ship and a quantity of provisions to them for cannon, powder, and shot, that they no longer needed, as they were preparing to return to France. The provisions gained from Hawkins enabled the French to survive and prepare to move back home as soon as possible.

The voyage returned a profit reported at 60%. Hawkins brought back to England the sweet potato and tobacco, which was initially used as a narcotic; smoking did not gain in popularity until years later.

== Slave voyage of John Lovell (1566–1567) ==
Hawkins first two slave voyages had angered the Spanish and in response the queen had prohibited Hawkins from going to sea. Instead he arranged his next slave voyage and gave the captaincy to a relative of his called John Lovell. Sir Francis Drake, who is also likely to be a relative of Lovell, was on the voyage.

Lovell sailed to the West African coast in 1566 and through piracy captured five ships, three of which were slave ships. He took the cargo of enslaved people and other goods to the Spanish West Indies to be sold. The sale of the cargo did not go well and Lovell deposited 92 enslaved people ashore without any payment. Drake later recalled the trip with embarrassment and Hawkins ascribed the failure to the "simpleness" of his deputies.

== Third slave voyage (1567–1569) ==
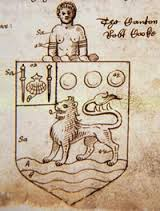
John Hawkins’ later coat of arms, showing an enslaved man and a scallop between two palmer’s staves

The Queen Elizabeth had forbidden Hawkins from going to sea but she relented, and he arranged a third slave voyage, departing Plymouth on 2 October 1567 with his second cousin Francis Drake as part of the crew. Arriving at the African coast, he could not secure enslaved people with ease because the local Portuguese agents were unwilling to trade with him. He attempted to capture and kidnap the inhabitants of a village on the Cap-Vert peninsula, near modern-day Dakar. The unprovoked raid was repulsed, Hawkins was wounded and eight of his men died slowly and painfully from wounds from poisoned arrows. Luckily, one of the captured slaves suggested using a clove of garlic as a cure, advising him to apply it to the wound to extract the venom. His next stop was Cacheu, in modern-day Guinea-Bissau, where he captured several trading vessels but was again driven back to his ships by the local Papel people and lancados. Hawkins recruited a local king in Sierra Leone to help him forcibly kidnap people, capturing over 500 people. On 7 February 1568, he set sail across the Atlantic Ocean to sell these people. He sold some of his captives in Margarita Province and others in Borburata, forcing residents again to buy his cargo. This included some of the 400 people he had captured and enslaved in West Africa. After careen their ships Francis Drake receives from Hawkins the command of the Judith. At Rio de la Hacha, the governor refused him permission to trade, so Francis Drake shot at his house and Hawkins took over the town in a battle, before selling the enslaved people.

The Battle of San Juan de Ulúa was fought between English privateers and Spanish forces at San Juan de Ulúa. The English fleet consisting of six armed merchant ships under Hawkins had been trading alongside the Spanish with the cooperation of local Spanish officials. The central Spanish authorities considered this to be illegal smuggling. Hawkins' ships were attacked unexpectedly, Drake fled on Judith and Hawkins was defeated. His remaining ship Minions limped home with only around 15 crew. The expedition, unfortunately, was financially devastating since most of his crew and supplies were destroyed. His reputation as a merchant took a hit, so to regain status and to get compensation, Hawkins wrote a short pamphlet about the violent attacks of the Spanish. This resulted in a multitude of depositions from March to April of 1569 before the High Court of the Admiralty from which Hawkins was able to benefit."

== 1570–1587 ==
Sir John Hawkins (left) with Sir Francis Drake (centre) and Sir Thomas Cavendish

In 1578 Hawkins was appointed Treasurer of the Navy, briefly he worked alongside his father-in-law, Benjamin Gonson, before taking full control of the position. He embarked on a comprehensive reform of naval administration and managed to achieve an annual saving of nearly £4,000 per annum, while at the same time raising naval pay. He reformed the design of galleons so that they were longer, able to carry a larger number of guns, more manoeuvrable and faster moving. As a result of Hawkins' reforms, according to Garrett Mattingly, the Navy was a "fighting-fleet faster and more weatherly than any that had ever been seen on the ocean before". He also increased the size of the Navy, so that by 1587 it consisted of 23 ships and 18 pinnaces.

Hawkins's financial reforms of the Navy upset many who had vested interests. In 1582, his rival, Sir William Wynter, accused him of administrative malfeasance, instigating a Royal Commission on fraud against him. The commission, under William Cecil, 1st Baron Burghley, Francis Walsingham, and Drake, concluded that there was no corruption, and that the Queen's Navy was in first-rate condition.

== Spanish Armada ==
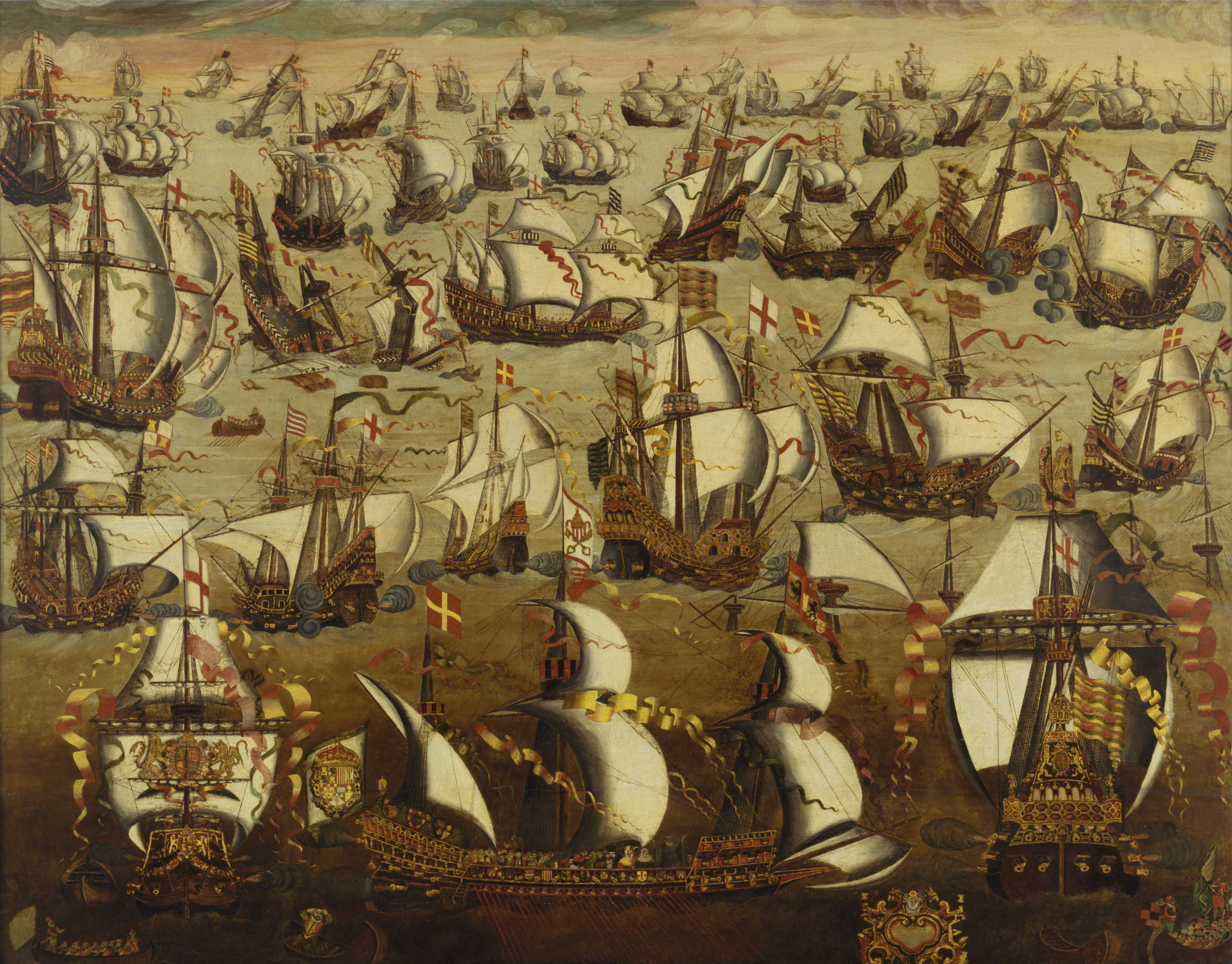
The Spanish Armada in 1588

Hawkins served as a Vice-Admiral during victory against the Spanish Armada, he was part of the war council and third in command overall. Hawkins had an extensive influence on the outcome of the engagement not only through his command, but because his improved ship designs, while acting as Treasurer of the Navy, had given the fleet more firepower and speed.

After that victory, Hawkins urged the seizure of Philip II's colonial treasure, in order to stop Spain re-arming. In 1589, Hawkins sailed with Francis Drake in the English Armada. One of its goals was to try to intercept the Spanish treasure ships departing from Mexico. One decisive action might have forced Philip II to the negotiating table and avoided fourteen years of continuing warfare. Instead, the voyage failed and the King was able to use the brief respite to rebuild his naval forces and, by the end of 1589, Spain once again had an Atlantic fleet strong enough to escort the American treasure ships home.

== Final years and death ==
Katherine Hawkins, his wife, died in 1591; he then married Margaret Vaughan (d. 1619), daughter of Charles Vaughan, a Lady of the Bedchamber of Queen Elizabeth I. According to Margaret her late husband possessed strong religious devotion which directed his choices throughout his personal and professional activities. She pointed out his steadfast loyalty to Queen Elizabeth I by focusing on his complete dedication to the Crown throughout his entire life. Margaret stated that his dedication to the state's protection and welfare became apparent through his naval accomplishments and leadership as well as his personal integrity and moral fortitude during difficult periods.

In 1593, Richard Hawkins, his son, was defeated and captured by the Spanish at a naval battle called the action of San Mateo Bay. With his cousin, Sir Francis Drake, John Hawkins raised a fleet of 27 ships to attack the Spanish in the West Indies. They set sail from Plymouth on 29 August 1595. Bad weather and skirmishes with the Spanish fleet hampered their efforts to get his son back. On 12 November 1595, it was reported that Hawkins had died at sea close to Puerto Rico.

== Legacy ==
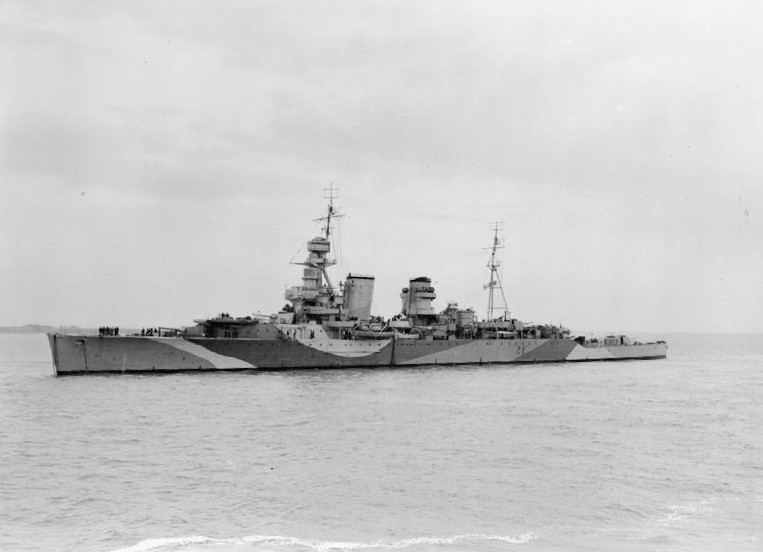
HMS Hawkins was named after him.

Hawkins’ legacy divides opinion. The historian Geoffrey Elton appraised Hawkins as "one of the founding-fathers of England's naval tradition ... he was a man of commanding presence and intellect, of outstanding abilities as a seaman, administrator, fighter and diplomat." More recently he has been described as a pirate and slave trader.

The Royal Navy named a heavy cruiser, HMS Hawkins after him, the ship was in commission between 1919 and 1947. The Hospital of Sir John Hawkins, Knight, in Chatham, Kent, was originally built by him and takes his name.

In the 16th century slavery was often accepted without a judgment of moral values. The Victorian era saw Hawkins described as the unscrupulous father of the English slave trade. In June 2006, Andrew Hawkins, a descendant, publicly apologised for John Hawkins's actions in the slave trade. In 2023, Plymouth City Council announced that due to Hawkins's links with the slave trade, it planned to rename Sir John Hawkins Square to Justice Square.

== Sources ==
- Brooks, George (2018). Landlords and Strangers: Ecology, Society, and Trade in Western Africa, 1000-1630. New York: Routledge.
- Kelsey, Harry. Sir John Hawkins, Queen Elizabeth's Slave Trader, Yale University Press, 384 pages, (April 2003), ISBN 978-0-300-09663-7
- Morgan, Basil (2004). "Hawkins, Sir John (1532–1595)". Oxford Dictionary of National Biography (online ed.). Oxford University Press. doi:10.1093/ref:odnb/12672. (Subscription, Wikipedia Library access or UK public library membership required.)
- Sugden, John (1990). Sir Francis Drake. London: Barrie & Jenkins. ISBN 0-7126-2038-9. OCLC 20931112.
