= David Gonson =

English Reformation Catholic Martyr

Blessed David Gonson
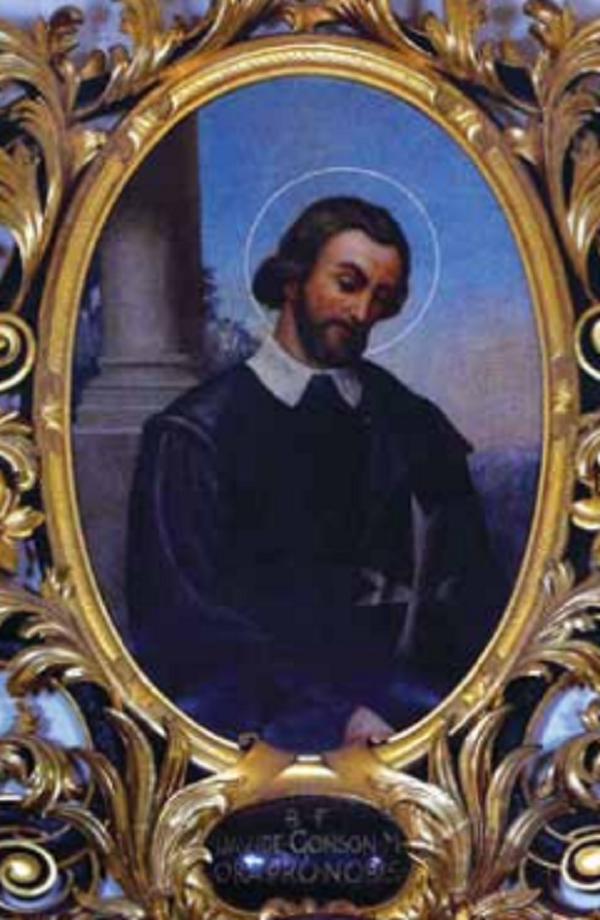
- Portrait of Blessed David Gonson in Prague

Martyr
- Born: c. 1510; Deptford, Kent, England
- Died: 12 July 1541; St Thomas Waterings, Southwark, England
- Venerated in: Catholic Church
- Beatified: 15 December 1929, Rome by Pope Pius XI
- Feast: 12 July

David Gonson (1510 – 12 July 1541), also known as David Gunston, was a Knight of Malta and Catholic martyr of the English Reformation.

== Life ==
Sir David Gonson was born in Deptford, Kent, the son of William Gonson and his wife Bennett Walter. His was a naval family, with his father serving as a Vice-Admiral and well connected with the nobility. His father had been born in Melton Mowbray and his uncle, Bartholomew, served as a priest there, during which time he erected the Gonson Memorial in the church paying tribute to his parents. David Gonson was received into the Order of Malta at the English Auberge in Valletta on 20 October 1533.

He served on board ships of the Order in the Mediterranean until 1540 when he returned to England. As part of the actions taken during the Reformation, the Order was suppressed in England by King Henry VIII on 10 May 1540. Gonson refused to recognise the authority of the king in spiritual matters. The writ against him claimed that in Malta "He denied that King Henry was supreme head of the Church of England and that he called the King a heretic" with the accusation being laid by a fellow knight, Sir Philip Babington. For this he was imprisoned in the Tower of London and subsequently at Marshalsea Prison.

In 1541 he was put on trial and convicted of treason for his denial of the king's authority in spiritual matters as laid down in law by the Act passed by Parliament in the preceding year that had dissolved the Order in England claiming the members 'sustained and maintained the usurped power and authority of the Bishop of Rome...untruly upholding, knowledging and affirming maliciously and traitorously the same Bishop to be the Supreme Head of Christ's Church'.

He was executed by being hanged, drawn and quartered at St Thomas' Waterings in Southwark on 12 July 1541. This site was commonly used in the 1500s for the execution of those who were religious dissenters or found guilty of treason.

He was beatified by Pope Pius XI in Rome on 15 December 1929 as one of the One Hundred and Seven Martyrs of England and Wales.
