= Great Henry Imperial =

Gryt Herry Imperyall (Great Henry Imperial) was a ship in England's Royal Navy during the reign of Henry VIII. It was captained by Edmund Howard, whose daughter, Catherine Howard, later became the fifth of the Wives of Henry VIII.
