= Lieutenant of the Admiralty =

Office of the Lieutenant of the Admiralty
- Ensign of the Royal Navy
- Department of the Admiralty
- Member of: Navy Board (1546–1564)
- Nominator: First Sea Lord
- Appointer: HM The King; Subject to formal approval by the King-in-Council
- Term length: Not fixed (usually for life)
- Formation: 1546–2005

Lieutenant of the Admiralty was for several centuries an honorary office, generally held by a senior retired Royal Navy admiral. From 1672 it was held jointly with the office of Vice-Admiral of the United Kingdom.

== History ==
A Lieutenant of the Admiralty (or Lieutenant-Admiral) first appears in the mid-14th century, deputising for the Admiral of England in the Court of Admiralty; occasional appointments were made for this purpose, but the post was often left dormant.

The post was revived under King Henry VIII: in 1546, when the Navy Board was formed, it was resolved that a Lieutenant of the Admiralty should be appointed to serve as its Head. The Navy Board was established on 24 April 1546, and on the same day Sir Thomas Clere was appointed Lieutenant of the Admiralty; the appointment was by Letters Patent, which stipulated an annual stipend attached to the post of £100 plus expenses (to include twenty pence per day for two clerks). Clere was succeeded in the office and role by Sir William Woodhouse; but after he died in office (in 1564) he was not replaced, and the Treasurer of the Navy (who was next in seniority) took over as Head of the Board.

The office of Lieutenant of the Admiralty was revived, however, in 1604 when it appears to have been given as a mark of honourable distinction - together with the salary of £100p.a., plus two clerks and certain travelling expenses - to Sir Richard Leveson (who had commanded the fleet in the Narrow Seas at the time of the accession in England of King James I). The office was left vacant after his death; however it was again revived in 1618, as part of a deal to persuade Sir Robert Mansell to resign as Treasurer of the Navy. He retained it (together with the established annual stipend) up until his death, at a relatively advanced age, in 1656. Following the Restoration, the office was again revived for Sir Edward Montagu (who had commanded the fleet that brought King Charles II back from his exile in the Dutch Republic), for whom the pay was increased to £450 a year.

In 1672 the post of Lieutenant of the Admiralty was conjoined with the office of Vice-Admiral of England (which became Vice-Admiral of Great Britain in 1707, and Vice-Admiral of the United Kingdom in 1801), the two remaining linked into the 21st century. Thus in 2001, Admiral Sir Jeremy Black was, like his predecessors, appointed by Letters Patent to 'the Office of Vice Admiral of the United Kingdom and Lieutenant of the Admiralty thereof'. Subsequently the appointment of Vice Admiral of the United Kingdom became attached to that of Commander-in-Chief Fleet, until 2012; notices published since then of appointments to the office of Vice Admiral of the United Kingdom have made no mention of the office of Lieutenant of the Admiralty.

== List of lieutenants of the admiralty ==
Note: Incomplete list

- Vice-Admiral Sir Thomas Clere, April 1546 - December 1552
- Sir William Woodhouse, December 1552 - 1564

Post in abeyance

- Sir Richard Leveson, April 1604 - July 1605

Post in abeyance

- Sir Robert Mansell May 1618 - June 1656

Post in abeyance

- Edward Montagu, 1st Earl of Sandwich, 1661-1672

In 1672, the office of Lieutenant of the Admiralty was merged with that of Vice Admiral of England, with Prince Rupert of the Rhine being appointed to both offices.

For a list of subsequent office-holders see Vice-Admiral of the United Kingdom.

== Sources ==
- Rodger, N.A.M. (1979). The Admiralty. Offices of State. Terence Dalton Ltd, Lavenham. Suffolk. England.
