= Treasurer of the Navy =

Civilian officer of the Royal Navy

Office of the Treasurer of the Navy
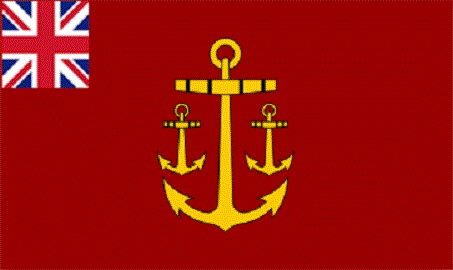
- Navy Board flag
- Department of the Admiralty
- Member of: Navy Board (1546–1832)
- Reports to: First Lord of the Admiralty
- Nominator: First Lord of the Admiralty
- Appointer: Prime Minister; Subject to formal approval by the King-in-Council
- Term length: Not fixed (typically 3–7 years)
- Inaugural holder: William Gonson
- Formation: 1524–1836

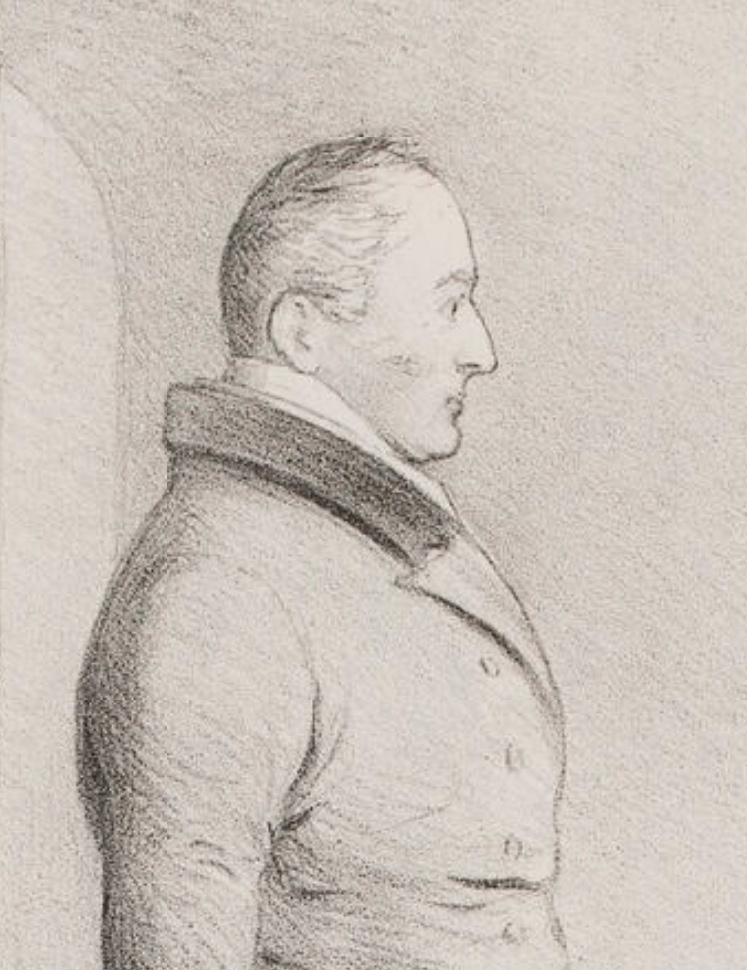
Sir Henry Parnell was the last Treasurer of the Navy

The Treasurer of the Navy, originally called Treasurer of Marine Causes or Paymaster of the Navy, was a civilian officer of the Royal Navy, one of the principal commissioners of the Navy Board responsible for naval finance from 1524 to 1832. The treasurer was based at the Navy Pay Office.

== History ==
Originally established in 1524, the first holder of the post was William Gonson; he held the office for twenty years until 1544. Although a member of the board, his office was semi-autonomous. The office-holder was responsible for the direction and control of the finance of the Royal Navy. The office was a political appointment and was frequently held by up-and-coming young politicians who would later go on to hold more important positions.

The Treasurer of the Navy Act 1830 (11 Geo. 4 & 1 Will. 4. c. 42) consolidated enactments relating to the office.

Before 1832 all accounts were dealt with by a number of different offices and officials. The Treasurer of the Navy originated during the reign of Henry VIII. He was the senior member of the Navy Board responsible for all Navy accounts; he gradually withdrew during the seventeenth century from the board's day-to-day affairs and his office, and the Navy Pay Office, came to be regarded as entirely separate from the Navy Office. The Treasurer of the Navy survived the re-organisational changes of 1832, but the office was abolished in 1835 and its duties were transferred to the Paymaster General's Office.

== Treasurers of the Navy 1524–1836 ==
Notable holders of this post included:

Service	Name	Notes
1524–October 1544	Vice-Admiral, Sir William Gonson	
October 1544–December 1545	Captain John Wynter	merchant and sea-captain of Bristol
25 Apr 1546–8 Jul 1549	Robert Legge	
8 Jul 1549–18 Nov 1577	Benjamin Gonson	
18 Nov 1577–26 Nov 1577	Benjamin Gonson and John Hawkins	
26 Nov 1577–12 Nov 1595	John Hawkins	Knighted 26 July 1588
22 Dec 1598–26 Apr 1604	Fulk Greville	
26 Apr 1604–11 May 1618	Sir Robert Mansell	
11 May 1618–5 Apr 1627	Sir William Russell	created baronet 12 March 1627
5 Apr 1627–21 Jan 1630	Sackville Crowe	created baronet 8 July 1627
1630–1639	Sir William Russell	
1639–1642	Sir William Russell and Henry Vane	
1642–1646	Sir William Russell and Sir John Penington (Royalist)	
1646–1654	Sir William Russell (Royalist)	
1645–1650	Sir Henry Vane (Parliamentary)	
1648–1650	Richard Fanshawe (Royalist)	
1651–1660	Richard Hutchinson (Parliamentary)	
1660–28 Jun 1667	Sir George Carteret	
28 Jun 1667–11 Nov 1668	Arthur Annesley, 1st Earl of Anglesey	
1668–1671	Sir Thomas Osborne and Sir Thomas de Littelton, Bt	
1671–1673	Sir Thomas Osborne	
1673–1681	Edward Seymour	
1681–1689	Anthony Carey, 5th Viscount Falkland	
1689–1699	Edward Russell, 1st Earl of Orford	
1699–1710	Sir Thomas de Littleton	
1710–1711	Robert Walpole	
1711–1714	Charles Caesar	
1714–1718	John Aislabie	
1718–1720	Richard Hampden	
1720–1724	George Byng, 1st Viscount Torrington	
1724–1734	Pattee Byng, 2nd Viscount Torrington	
1734–1742	Arthur Onslow	
1742	Thomas Clutterbuck	
1742–1743	Sir Charles Wager	
1743–1744	Sir John Rushout, 4th Baronet	
1744–1749	George Bubb Dodington	
1749–1754	Henry Legge	
1754–1756	George Grenville	
1756	George Bubb Dodington	
1756–1762	George Grenville	
1762–1765	William Wildman Barrington, 2nd Viscount Barrington	
1765–1770	Richard Howe, 4th Viscount Howe	
1770–1777	Sir Gilbert Elliot, 3rd Bt	
1777–1782	Welbore Ellis	
1782	Isaac Barré	
1782–1783	Henry Dundas	
1783–1784	Charles Townshend	
1784–1800	Henry Dundas	Except 1 January 1786 – 18 August 1802
1800–1801	Dudley Ryder	
1801–1803	Charles Bragge	
1803–1804	George Tierney	
1804–1806	George Canning	
1806–1807	Richard Brinsley Sheridan	
1807–1818	George Rose	
1818–1823	Frederick John Robinson	
1823–1827	William Huskisson	
1827–1828	Charles Grant	
1828–1830	William Vesey Fitzgerald	
1830	Thomas Frankland Lewis	
1830–1834	Charles Poulett Thomson	
1834–1835	William Lowther, Viscount Lowther	
1835–1836	Sir Henry Parnell	

== Departments and offices under Treasurer ==
Included:

- Navy Pay Office (1546–1832) This was in effect the larger part of the Treasurer of the Navy's Department.
- Department of the Accountant-General of the Navy (1829–1832)

== Bibliography ==
- Sainty, J. C. (2003), A provisional list: Navy Treasurer c. 1546–1836, The Institute of Historical Research (IHR), School of Advanced Study at the University of London
