= Navy Board =

Organisation of the Royal Navy between 1546 and 1832

The Navy Board (1546–1832)
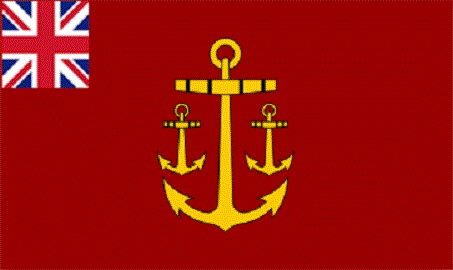
- The Flag of the Navy Board in 1832

Board overview
- Formed: 24 April 1546
- Preceding Board: Council of the Marine
- Dissolved: 1 June 1832
- Jurisdiction: Kingdom of England (1546-1707); Great Britain (1707–1801); United Kingdom of Great Britain and Ireland (1801–1832)
- Headquarters: Navy Office
- Board executive: Lieutenant of the Admiralty Treasurer of the Navy Comptroller of the Navy
- Parent department: Admiralty

The Navy Board (formerly known as the Council of the Marine or Council of the Marine Causes) was the commission responsible for the day-to-day civil administration of the Royal Navy between 1546 and 1832. The board was headquartered within the Navy Office.

== History ==
The origins of the Navy Board can be traced back to the 13th century via the office of Keeper of the King's Ports and Galleys, later known as the Clerk of the King's Ships. The management of the navy expanded with the Keeper of the Storehouses, appointed in 1514, and the Clerk Comptroller in 1522. The Lieutenant of the Admiralty, Treasurer of Marine Causes, and Surveyor and Rigger of the Navy were all added in 1544, and a seventh officer, the Master of Naval Ordnance, was added a year later. By January 1545, this group was already working as a body known as the Council of the Marine or King's Majesty's Council of His Marine.

In the first quarter of 1545, an official memorandum proposed the establishment of a new organisation that would formalize a structure for administering the navy with a clear chain of command. The Navy Board was officially appointed to this role by letters patent of Henry VIII on the 24th of April 1546. It was directed by the Lieutenant of the Admiralty until 1557. The board was charged with overseeing the administrative affairs of the navy; directive, executive and operational duties of the Lord High Admiral remained with the Admiralty and Marine Affairs Office.

In 1557 the Lieutenant of the Admiralty ceased to direct the Navy Board, and that role was given to the Treasurer of the Navy, also known as the Senior Commissioner. The Navy Board remained independent until 1628, when it became a subsidiary body of the Board of Admiralty, now reporting to the First Lord of the Admiralty. In 1660, the Treasurer of the Navy ceased to direct the board and was replaced by the Comptroller, who now held the new joint title of "Chairman of the Board". In 1832, Sir James Graham's proposals to restructure the Naval Service led to the abolition of the Navy Board, along with its subsidiary boards for Sick and Hurt, Transport, and Victualling. Operational functions were taken over by the Board of Admiralty, and administrative functions were dispersed between the Naval Lords.

== Duties and responsibilities ==
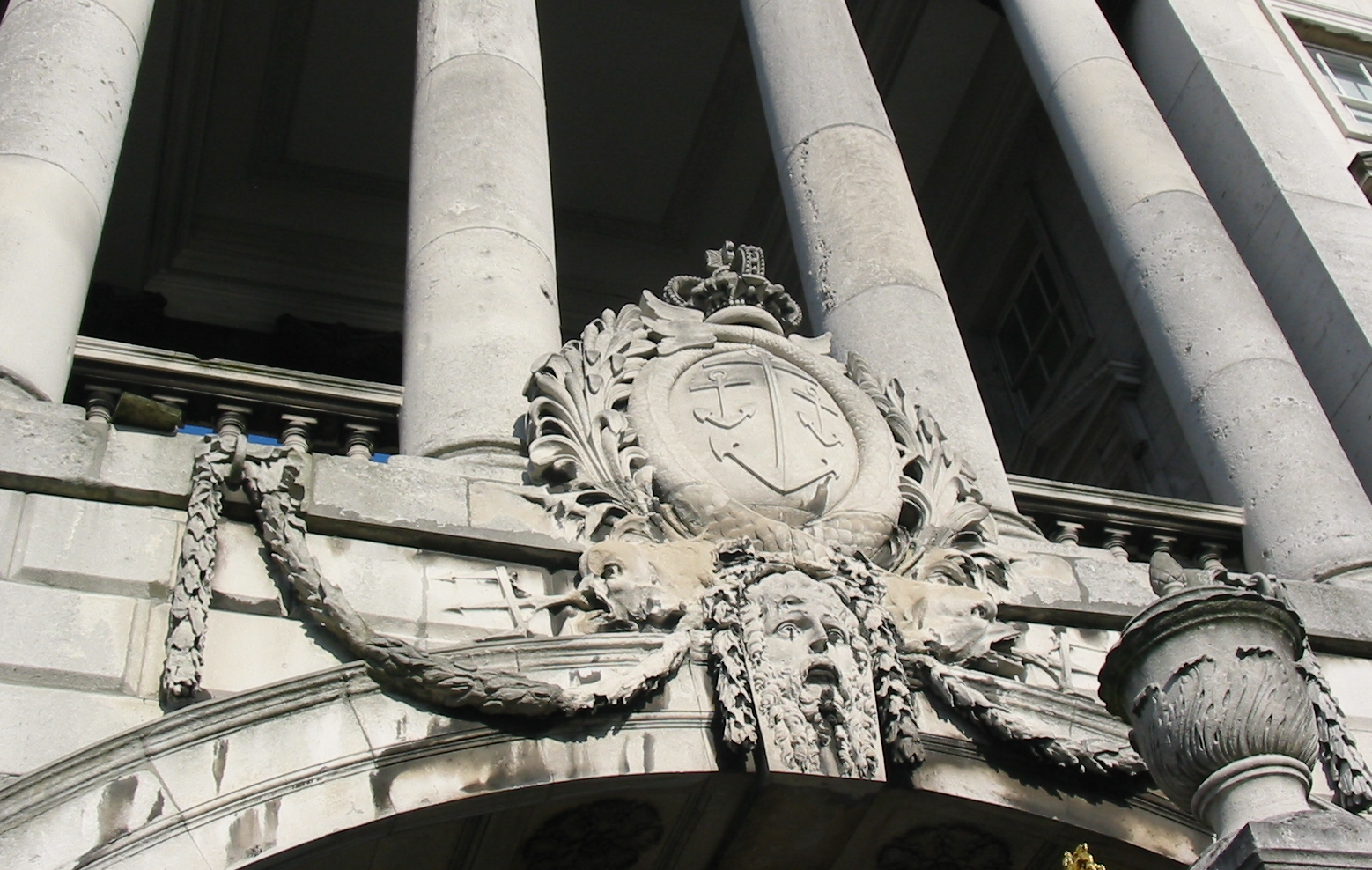
Badge of the Navy Board on Somerset House (the Board's headquarters 1789–1832)

The Navy Board as a whole held responsibilities including:

- the construction and maintenance of ships through the Royal Dockyards of Deptford, Woolwich, Portsmouth, and Chatham, as well as the operations of these dockyards and other naval establishments.
- the procurement of victuals (obtained from private contractors or "agents"), stores, supplies, and services for the fleet and provision of ordnance items (sourced from the Office of Ordnance).
- civilian and naval pay.
- the appointment of junior officers and warrant officers.

Individual officials held the following responsibilities:

- The Lieutenant of the Admiralty initially presided over the Council of the Marine (1545–1564) but was later superseded by the treasurer.
- The Treasurer of the Navy was senior commissioner of the board from 1564 to 1660 and controlled and directed all naval finance – though in practice his responsibilities were later increasingly devolved to the Comptroller.
- The Comptroller of the Navy was in charge of naval spending and also acted as chairman of the board from 1660 until its abolition in 1832.
- The Surveyor of the Navy was in charge of naval shipbuilding, ship design and running the Royal Dockyards.
- The Clerk of the Navy was in charge of the day-to-day running of the board and the administration of its work and acted as chief secretary to the Navy Office.
- The Surveyor of Marine Victuals was responsible for the administration of victualling yards and supply of food and beverages for the Royal Navy from 1550 to 1679. This office was abolished and replaced by the Victualling Board in 1683.
- The Master of Naval Ordnance was a specifically assigned officer from the Ordnance Office responsible for the supply of Naval Ordnance and was briefly a member from 1561 to 1569.
- The Comptroller of Storekeepers' Accounts, the Comptroller of Treasurer's Accounts and the Comptroller of Victualling Accounts were posts created to relieve the Comptroller of the Navy of these duties.

Note: The Navy Pay Office (domain of the Treasurer of the Navy) was independent of the Board; though the Board's Commissioners were required to authorize payments, all funds were held and issued by the Pay Office (which was also known as the Navy Treasury).

== Subsidiary boards ==
As the size of the fleet grew, the Admiralty sought to focus the activity of the Navy Board on two areas: ships and their maintenance, and naval expenditure. Therefore, from the mid-to-late 17th century, a number of subsidiary boards were established to oversee other aspects of the board's work. These included:

- The Victualling Board (1683–1832). Responsible for providing naval personnel with food, drink and supplies.
- The Sick and Hurt Board (established temporarily in times of war from 1653, placed on a permanent footing from 1715, and amalgamated into the Transport Board from 1806). Responsible for providing medical support services to the navy and managing prisoners of war.
- The Transport Board (1690–1724, re-established 1794, amalgamated into the Victualling Board in 1817). Responsible for the provision of transport services and for the transportation of supplies and military equipment.

Each of these subsidiary boards went on to gain a degree of independence, though they remained, nominally at least, overseen by the Navy Board.

== Principal officers and commissioners ==
=== Tudor and Stuart period ===
List of Principal Officers and Commissioners 1546-1660 included.

- the Lieutenant of the Admiralty, (He presided over the Navy Board from 1546 to 1564 until he was superseded by the Treasurer.
- the Treasurer of the Navy originally called Treasurer of Marine Causes he was Senior Commissioner of the board from 1564 to 1660
- the Surveyor of the Navy, originally called Surveyor and Rigger of the Navy (1546-1660)
- the Clerk of the Navy, originally called Clerk of the Kings Ships (1546-1660)
- the Surveyor of Marine Victuals (1550-1679) (against protocol he was added under monarchs, Elizabeth I, James I and Charles I).
- the Comptroller of the Navy, originally called the Clerk Comptroller of the Navy was in charge of Naval spending he also acted as Chairman of the Board from 1660.
- the Keeper of the Storehouses, also called Clerk of the Storehouses he was briefly a member in (1546–1560) his duties were later merged with the treasurers.
- the Master of Naval Ordnance, specifically assigned officer from the Ordnance Board was briefly a member from (1546–1589).

Four to seven "Principal Officers" had an important role in the early administration of the Navy Office; however some were styled differently prior to 1660. Between 1625 and 1640, Charles I added a fifth. The Navy Board was given autonomy by Edward VI's Ordinances, but remained subordinate to the Lord High Admiral until 1628. This – at times ambiguous – relationship with the Admiralty was an enduring characteristic of the board and was one of the reasons behind its eventual demise in 1832.

=== Commonwealth and Restoration period ===
During the Commonwealth, the business of both the Navy Board and the Admiralty was carried out by a committee of Parliament. Following the Restoration, James, Duke of York (as Lord High Admiral), oversaw the reconstitution of the Navy Board. Alongside the aforementioned "Principal Officers" further officials were appointed to serve as "Commissioners" of the Navy, and together these constituted the board. By tradition, commissioners were always Navy officers of the rank of post-captain or captain who had retired from active service at sea.

List of Principal Officers and Commissioners 1660-1796 included.

- Comptroller of the Navy (chaired meetings of the board (Note: In the mid-eighteenth century, and particularly during the War of Jenkins' Ear from 1739 to 1748, the Navy Board was chaired by Surveyor Jacob Acworth, because the Controller, Richard Haddock, was considered by his peers to be too old and feeble to carry out the role. The chairmanship reverted to the Controller after Haddock was superannuated in February 1749.) and liaised with the First Lord of the Admiralty)
- Surveyor of the Navy
- Treasurer of the Navy
- Clerk of the Acts of the Navy

Additional Commissioners added after 1666, who were soon given specific duties (so as to lessen the administrative burden placed on the Controller.

- Controller of Treasurer Accounts, (1667–1796)
- Controller of Victualling Accounts, (1667–1796)
- Controller of Storekeepers Accounts, (1671–1796)
- Commissioners for Old Accounts, (1686–1688)
- Commissioners for Current Business, (1686–1688)
- Commissioners for Examining Accounts (Incurred), (1688–1689)
- Deputy Comptroller of the Navy, (1793–1813)

=== Hanoverian period ===
In 1796 the board was reconstituted: the post of Clerk of the Acts was abolished, as were the three controllers of accounts. Henceforward, the board would consist of the controller and a deputy controller (both of whom were normally commissioned officers), the surveyor (usually a master shipwright from one of the dockyards), and around seven other commissioners (a mixture of officers and civilians) to whom no specific duties were attached.

The treasurer, though still technically a member of the board, was (like the dockyard commissioners) seldom in attendance. In fact, the post of treasurer was by this stage little more than a sinecure; the main work of his department was carried out by its senior clerk, the Paymaster of the Navy.

Following the abolition of the office of Clerk of the Acts, the post of secretary to the board was created; as well as overseeing the administrative department, the secretary attended meetings of the board and took minutes, but he was not himself a commissioner and did not therefore have a vote.

List of Principal Officers and Commissioners 1796-1832 included:

- Comptroller of the Navy
- Surveyor of the Navy
- Treasurer of the Navy
- Deputy Surveyor of the Navy
- Pay Commissioner, (1796–1814).
- Inspector-General of Naval Works, (1807–1808), from 1796 to 1807 post holder reported to the Board of Admiralty
- Civil Architect and Engineer of the Navy, (1808–1812)
- Surveyor of Buildings, (1812–1832)
- Surveyor of Dockyards, (1813–1832).
- Accountant-General of the Navy, (1829–32)
- Storekeeper General of the Navy, (1829–32)
- Deputy Comptroller of the Navy, (1829–1832)
- Superintendent of Transport, (1829–1831)

=== Commissioners of the Navy ===
To all of these lists must be added the Commissioners of the Navy with oversight of the Royal Navy Dockyards. Normally resident at their respective dockyards and thus known as resident commissioners, these commissioners did not normally attend the board's meetings in London; nevertheless, they were considered full members of the Navy Board and carried the full authority of the board when implementing or making decisions within their respective yards both at home and overseas. Not every Dockyard had a resident commissioner in charge, but the larger Yards, both at home and overseas, generally did (with the exception of the nearby Thames-side yards of Deptford and Woolwich, which were for the most part overseen directly by the board in London, although Woolwich did have a Resident Commissioner for some years). Chatham Dockyard, Devonport Dockyard, Portsmouth Dockyard, Sheerness Dockyard, Trincomalee Dockyard, and Bermuda Dockyard all had Resident Commissioners.

After the abolition of the board in 1832, the duties of these commissioners were taken over by commissioned officers: usually an admiral-superintendent at the largest yards or a captain-superintendent at smaller yards.

== Headquarters ==
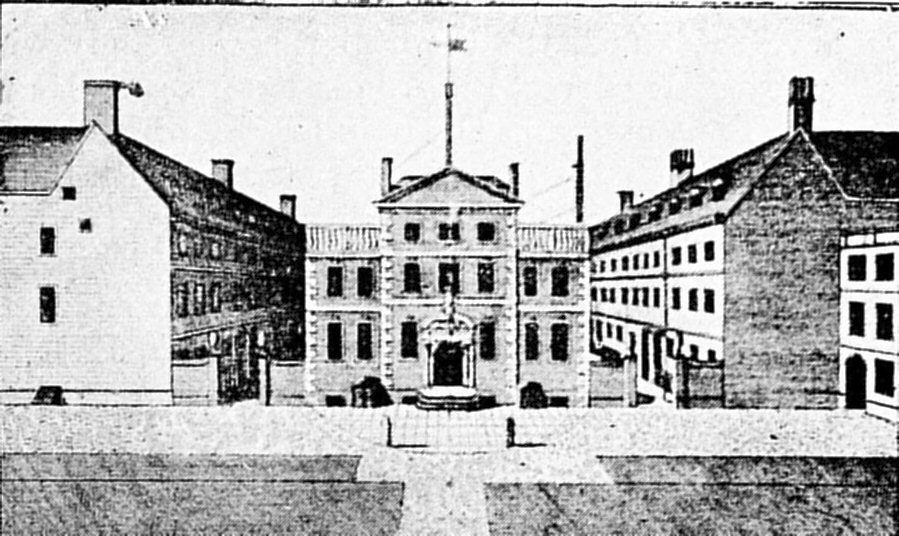
Navy Office, Crutched Friars (the Board's headquarters 1656–1788)

From the 1650s, the board, together with its staff of around 60 clerks, was accommodated in a large house at the corner of Crutched Friars and Seething Lane, just north of the Tower of London. Following a fire, the house was rebuilt by Sir Christopher Wren. This new Navy Office provided accommodation for the commissioners, as well as office space. Different departments were accommodated in different parts of the building; the rear wing (which had its own entrance on Tower Hill) housed the offices of the Sick and Hurt Board. The Victualling Office was also located nearby, on Little Tower Hill, close to its early manufacturing base at Eastminster. The Navy Treasury, where the treasurer was based, was located from 1664 in Broad Street (having moved there from Leadenhall Street). It was also known as the Navy Pay Office. In 1789, all these offices were relocated into the new purpose-built office complex of Somerset House.

== Demise ==
By the early nineteenth century, members of Parliament had begun raising concerns about the cost of Navy Board operations and the obscurity of its record-keeping. On 15 February 1828, Robert Peel, the Home Secretary, established a Parliamentary Committee to review the board's operations. The committee, chaired by Irish MP Henry Parnell, was specifically charged with interpreting and reducing Navy Board costs. By the end of the year, it had issued critical reports covering the board's administration of naval pensions, half-pay, revenue, expenditure, and debt. In particular, the committee noted the Navy Board had long since abandoned financial controls; that it had instead "established a scale of expense greatly beyond what existed during former periods of peace," and that its operations tended to "exalt its own importance" over the needs of the public service as a whole.

The board's internal operations were also found wanting:

The ancient and wise control vested by our financial policy in the hands of the Treasury over all the departments connected with the Public Expenditure, has been in a great degree set aside. Although it is the [Navy Board] practice to lay the annual estimates before the Board of Treasury, the subsequent course of expenditure is not practically restrained ... Old modes of conducting public business, full of complexity and inconsistency, have too long been suffered to exist; official forms and returns have been multiplied; and the result has been an unnecessary increase of establishments.

— Sir Henry Parnell MP, Select Committee on the State of Public Income and Expenditure, End of Session Report, Volume Four, 1828.

The government's response was delivered on 14 February 1832, with a bill to abolish both the Navy Board and the Victualling Board and merge their functions into the Board of Admiralty. This bill was moved by Sir James Graham as First Lord of the Admiralty, who argued that the boards had been "constituted at a period when the principles of banking were unknown," and were redundant in an era of greater Parliamentary oversight and regulation. An amendment proposed by First Sea Lord Sir George Cockburn suggested that Navy Board be preserved and only the Victualling Board abolished, but this was defeated by 118 votes to 50. The bill itself was passed on 23 May 1832, with the Navy Board formally ceasing operations from 1 June.

== Sources ==
- Rodger, N.A.M. (1979). The Admiralty. Offices of State. Terence Dalton Ltd, Lavenham. Suffolk. England.
- Collinge, J M, ed. (1978), "Principal officers and commissioners", Office-Holders in Modern Britain Volume 7, Navy Board Officials 1660–1832, London, pp. 18–25 – via British History Online
