= Thomas Pollard =

Thomas Pollard may refer to:

- Thomas Pollard (actor), 17th-century actor in the acting troupe of William Shakespeare and Richard Burbage
- Thomas D. Pollard (born 1942), educator, cell biologist and biophysicist
- Thomas Pollard (shipbuilder), 18th-century English shipbuilder
- Tom Pollard (opera producer) (1857–1922), New Zealand comic opera producer and manager
- Tom Pollard (footballer) (1894–1941), Australian rules footballer
- Tommy Pollard (1923–1960), English jazz musician
