= Deptford Dockyard =

Naval dockyard and base at Deptford on the River Thames

HM Dockyard, Deptford
- Deptford, NW Kent
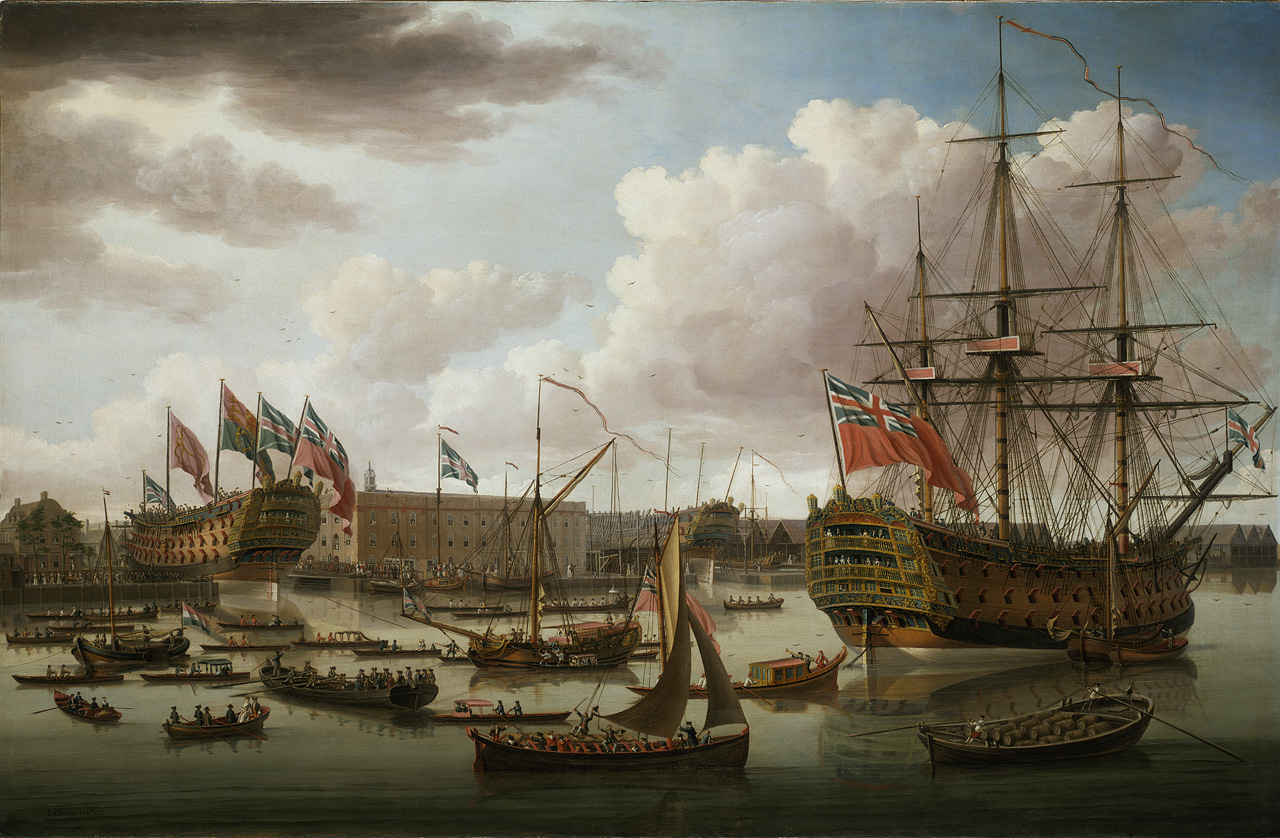
- The yard in its heyday. The launch of the 80-gun HMS Cambridge from the Great Dock in 1755, depicted by John Cleveley the Elder. In the foreground a first rate warship rides at anchor, while another warship nears completion on the slipway in the centre background.

Site information
- Operator: Royal Navy
- Controlled by: The Navy Board (until 1832); the Admiralty (1832–1869).
- Other site facilities: The Victualling Yard and Transport Board office.

Location
- Coordinates: 51°29′11″N 0°1′39″W

Site history
- In use: 1513–1869

Deptford Dockyard was an important naval dockyard and base at Deptford on the River Thames, operated by the Royal Navy from the sixteenth to the nineteenth centuries. It built and maintained warships for 350 years, and many significant events and ships have been associated with it.

Founded by Henry VIII in 1513, the dockyard was the most significant royal dockyard of the Tudor period and remained one of the principal naval yards for three hundred years. Important new technological and organisational developments were trialled here, and Deptford came to be associated with the great mariners of the time, including Francis Drake and Walter Raleigh. The yard expanded rapidly throughout the sixteenth and seventeenth centuries, encompassing a large area and serving for a time as the headquarters of naval administration, and the associated Victualling Yard became the Victualling Board's main depot. Emperor Peter the Great visited the yard officially incognito in 1698 to learn shipbuilding techniques. Reaching its zenith in the eighteenth century, it built and refitted exploration ships used by Cook, Vancouver and Bligh, and warships which fought under Nelson.

The dockyard declined in importance after the Napoleonic Wars. Its location upriver on the Thames made access difficult, and the shallow narrow river hampered navigation of the large new warships. The dockyard was largely inactive in the 1830s, but was re-established as a shipbuilding yard in the 1840s. The navy finally closed the dockyard in 1869. While the adjacent victualling yard, that had been established in the 1740s, continued in use until the 1960s, the land used by the dockyard was sold; the area (known as Convoys Wharf) is currently being redeveloped for housing, commercial, leisure and other purposes.

Archaeological excavations took place at the dockyard in 2010–12.

== History ==
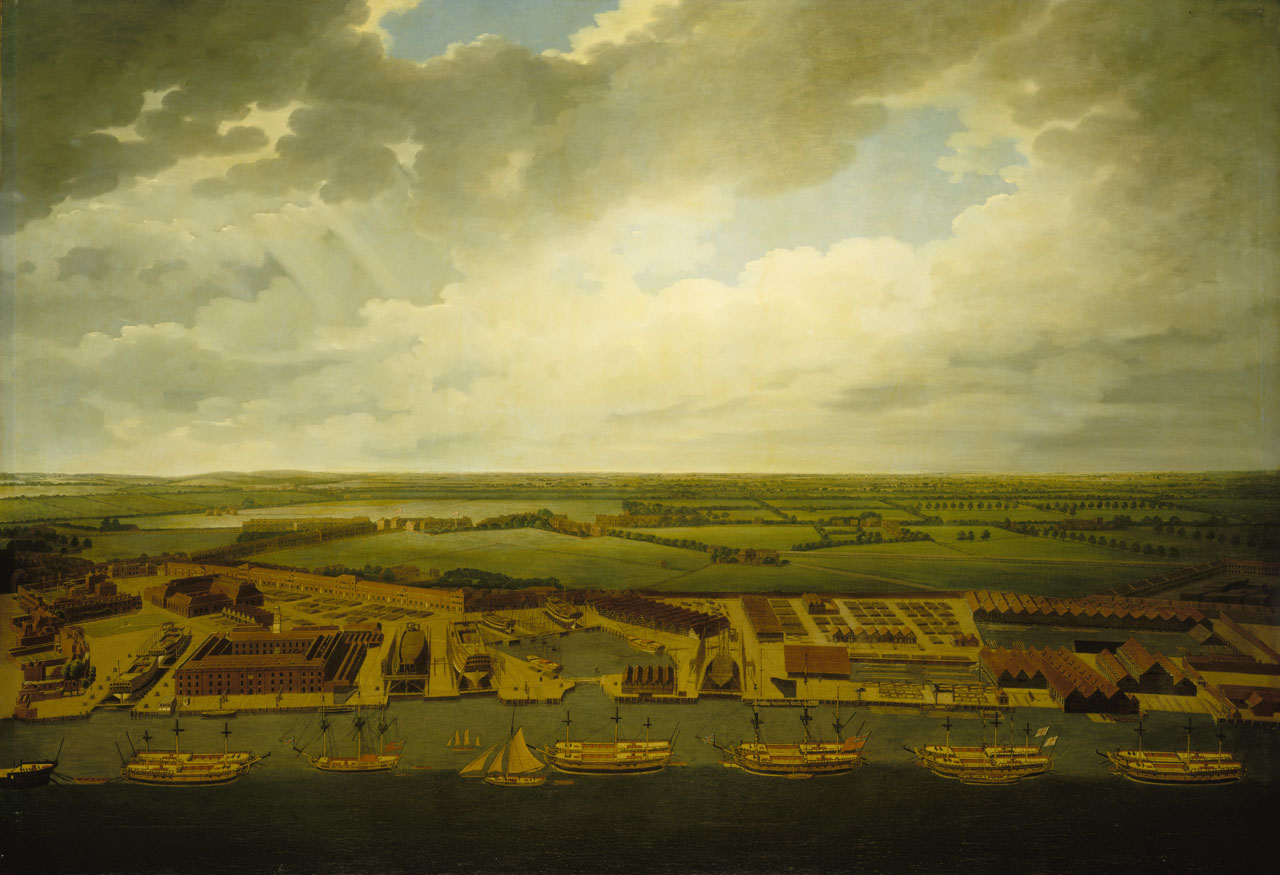
Painting of the Dockyard by Joseph Farington, c.1794, showing (left to right along the shore): Officers' houses & offices; The double dry dock (and beyond it the smithery); Quadrangular Great Storehouse; A pair of shipbuilding slips; Wet dock (or basin); Shipbuilding slip; Mast houses and mast pond; Boat house; New mast house and pond; (See plan below for further details).

=== Foundation ===
The Deptford area had been used to build royal ships since the early fifteenth century, during the reign of Henry V. Moves were made to improve the administration and operation of the Royal Navy during the Tudor period, and Henry VII paid £5 rent for a storehouse in Deptford in 1487, before going on to found the first royal dockyard at Portsmouth in 1496. Henry's son, Henry VIII furthered his father's expansion plans, but preferred locations along the Thames to south coast ports, establishing Woolwich Dockyard in 1512, followed by dockyards at Deptford in 1513 and Erith in 1514. The latter two were centred around large storehouses, built in order to serve the navy's needs in the War of the League of Cambrai.

=== The Tudor dockyard ===
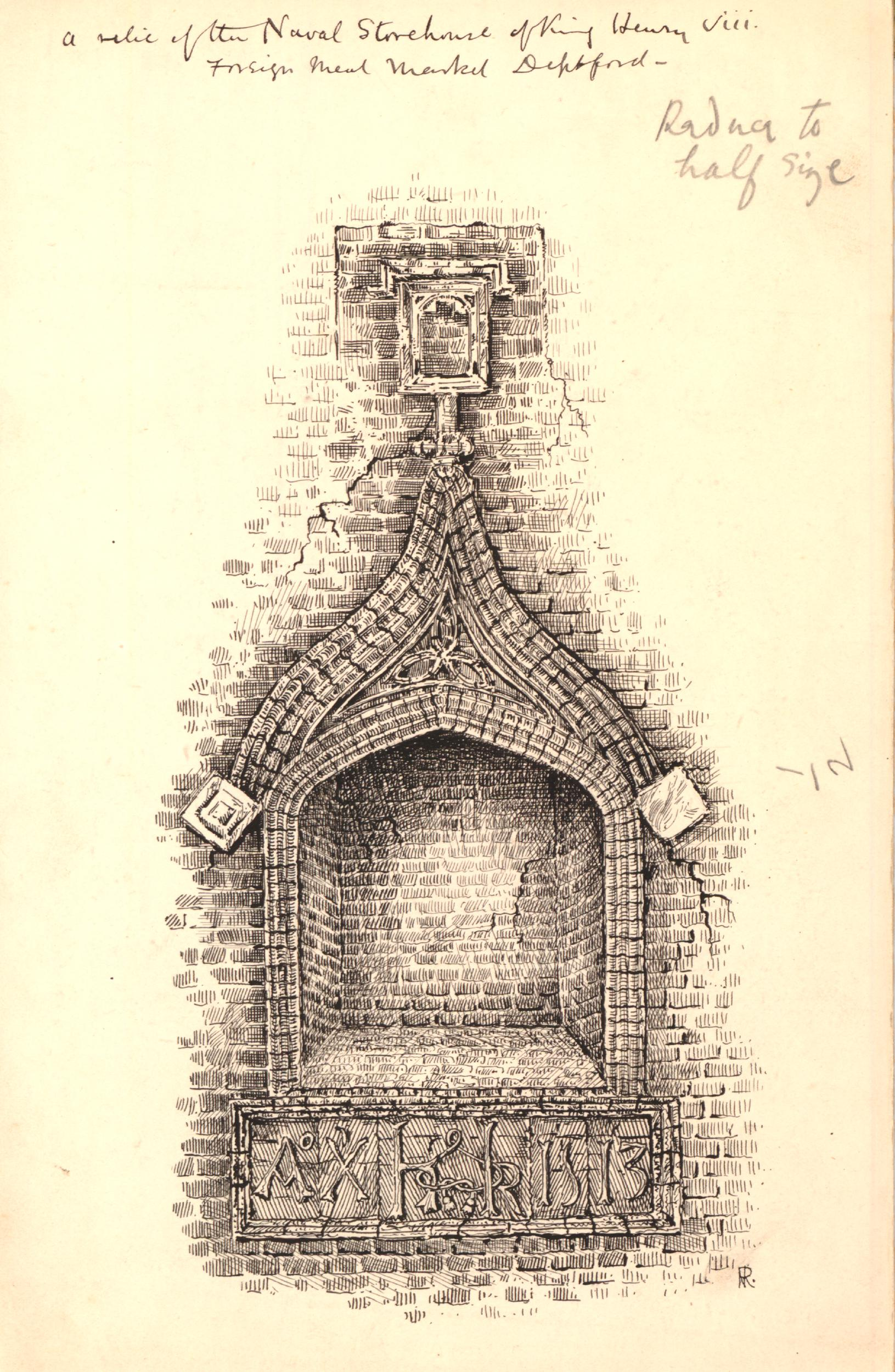
Tudor date stone from the Grand Storehouse, marked 'A°X' [in the Year of Christ] and '1513', either side of the royal cypher of Henry VIII.

Deptford's Tudor 'Great Store-house' (which outlasted the Dockyard itself) dated from 1513, as recorded on its (still surviving) foundation stone. 172 ft (52 m) in length, it stood parallel to the riverbank on a north-west/south-east axis; it was a two-storey brick building with an attic, standing 35 ft (11 m) high. The Great Dock (a double-length dry dock) lay perpendicular to it, to the south-east, and was built at around the same time.

North-west of the storehouse, a natural pond (which had formed at the mouth of the Orfleteditch, a minor tributary) was in 1517 converted into a basin (or wet dock) to provide a protected mooring area for several of the King's ships. The physical expansion of Deptford at this time reflected the increasing development and sophistication of naval administration: in the 1540s a large house was built, adjoining the north-west end of the storehouse, which served as he official residence of the Treasurer of the Navy up until the 1660s; and with the creation of the antecedent of the Navy Board in the mid-sixteenth century, a new house was built nearby at Deptford Strand for the "officers' clerks of the Admiralty to write therein".

The dockyard grew to be the most important of the royal dockyards, employing increasing numbers of workers, and expanding to incorporate new storehouses. During the Siege of Boulogne in 1544, Deptford's dockyard managed expenditure of £18,824 (in contrast to £3,439 spent at Woolwich and £1,211 at Portsmouth). Its importance meant that it was visited on occasion by the monarch to inspect new ships building there. This was reflected in the expenditure of £88 by the Treasurer of the Navy in 1550 in order to pay for Deptford High Street to be paved, as the road was "previously so noisome and full of filth that the King's Majesty might not pass to and fro to see the building of his Highness's ships."

The dock was rebuilt and wharves expanded to cover 500–600 feet of the river front by the end of the sixteenth century. It had by then become known as the "King's Yard". Deptford became increasingly sophisticated in its operations, with £150 paid in 1578 to build gates for the dry dock, removing the necessity of constructing a temporary earth dockhead and then digging it away to free the ship once work had been completed.^{[a]}

The significance of Deptford to English maritime strength was highlighted when Elizabeth I knighted Francis Drake at the dockyard in 1581 after his circumnavigation of the globe aboard the Golden Hind. She ordered that the Golden Hind be moored in Deptford Creek for public exhibition, where the ship remained until the 1660s before rotting away and being broken up. The dockyard is one of the locations associated with the story of Sir Walter Raleigh laying his cloak before Elizabeth's feet. Deptford's significant role during this and later periods resulted in it being termed the "Cradle of the Navy."

=== Stuart expansion ===
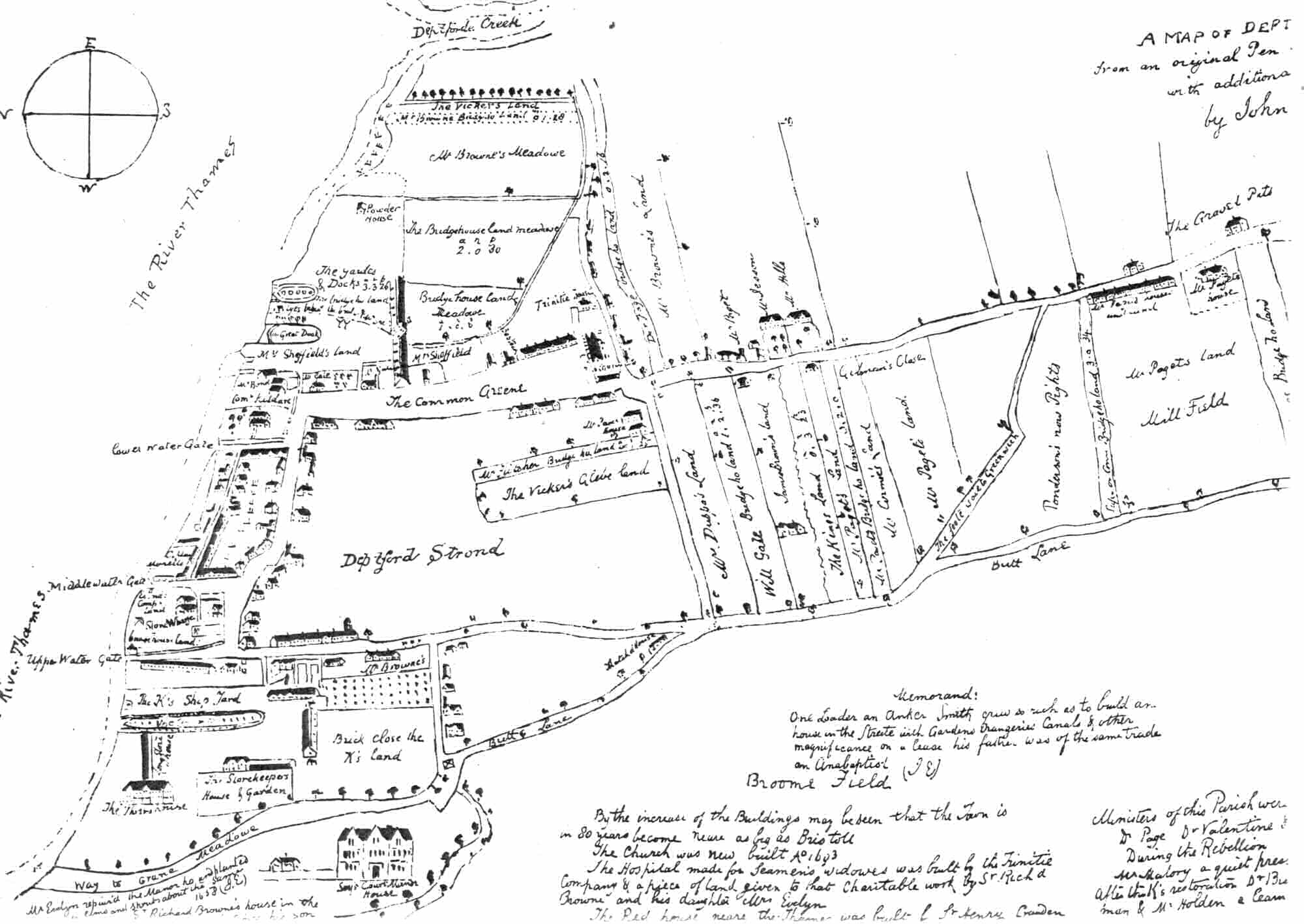
The Deptford area on a map owned in 1623 by John Evelyn, a resident of the area. Evelyn's house, Sayes Court, is at the bottom left. Above it is marked "The K's Ship Yard", the location of the expanding Deptford Dockyard: the "Long Store house" is shown, between the Great Dock and the Treasurer's House, and nearby is "the Storekeepers house and garden".

The growth of other shipyards, particularly Chatham Dockyard on the River Medway, eventually threatened Deptford's supremacy, and by the early seventeenth century the possibility of closing and selling Deptford yard was being discussed. Though Deptford and Woolwich possessed the only working docks, the Thames was too narrow, shallow and heavily used and the London dockyards too far from the sea to make it an attractive anchorage for the growing navy. Attention shifted to the Medway and defences and facilities were constructed at Chatham and Sheerness.

Despite this, Deptford Dockyard continued to flourish and expand, being closely associated with the Pett dynasty, which produced several master shipwrights during the late sixteenth and early seventeenth centuries. A commission in the navy in the 1620s decided to concentrate construction at Deptford. The commission ordered the construction of six great ships, three middling ships and one small ship, all from Andrew Borrell at Deptford, at a delivery rate of two a year for five years. By the seventeenth century the yard covered a large area and included large numbers of storehouses, slipways, smiths, and other maintenance facilities and workshops. The Great Dock was lengthened and enlarged in 1610, several slipways were remodelled and in 1620 a second dry dock was built, with a third being authorised in 1623.

There was further investment in the Commonwealth period, with money spent on providing a mast dock and three new wharves. Facilities were again improved in the wake of the Glorious Revolution of 1688: a 'Great New Storehouse' replaced the Treasurer's House alongside the Tudor storehouse, and by the end of the century additional ranges had created an informal quadrangle of buildings. At around the same time terraces of houses for the officers of the yard were built along the south-eastern boundary of the site (they continued in use after the closure of the Dockyard, and were only demolished in 1902).

The yard was visited by Peter the Great, Emperor of Russia, in 1698. He stayed in nearby Sayes Court, which had been temporarily let furnished by John Evelyn to Admiral John Benbow. During Peter's stay, Evelyn's servant wrote to him to report "There is a house full of people and right nasty. The Tsar lies next your library, and dines in the parlour next your study. He dines at ten o'clock and at six at night, is very seldom at home a whole day, very often in the King's Yard or by water, dressed in several dresses." Peter studied shipbuilding techniques and practices at the dockyard.^{[b]}

The Great Dock was rebuilt again in 1711, with gates provided halfway along its length so as to form a true 'double dock' (able to accommodate two vessels lengthwise).

=== Early-Georgian flourishing ===
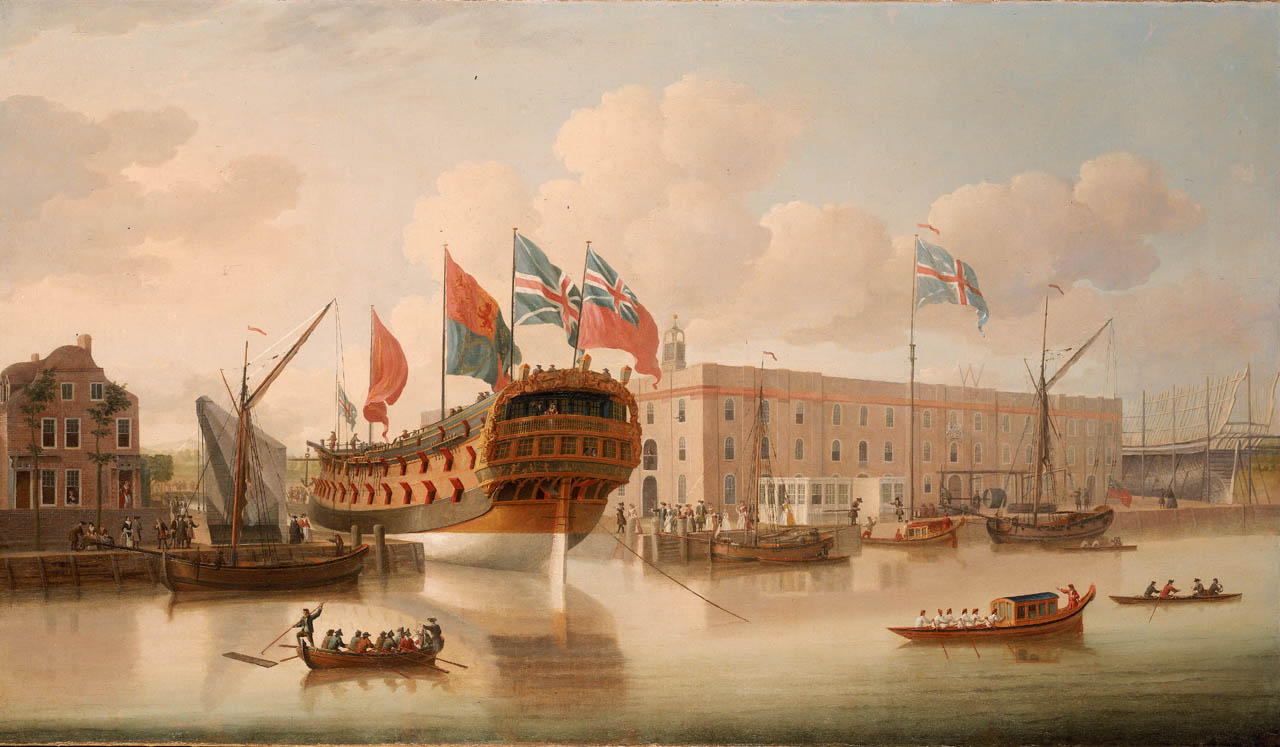
HMS St Albans being floated out of the Great Dock onto the Thames at Deptford in 1747 (depicted by John Cleveley the Elder). Also shown are the Master Shipwright's House (built in 1705, left) and the Great Storehouse (rebuilt by 1739, right).

The early to mid-eighteenth century was a time of considerable rebuilding and upgrading at Deptford Dockyard. The storehouse complex was rebuilt more formally as a quadrangle at this time, enclosing the original Great Storehouse of 1513; the mast pond was rebuilt, as was the wet dock, and the smithery (where anchors and other metal items were forged) was enlarged. In 1716 a further dry dock was added (opening into the wet dock, as did three of the yard's five building slips).

With the increasing specialisation among the royal dockyards, Deptford concentrated on building smaller warships and was the headquarters of the naval transport service. Throughout the various wars of the eighteenth and nineteenth centuries, the navy sought to relieve pressure on the main fleet bases by concentrating shipbuilding and fitting out at riverine docks like Chatham, Woolwich and Deptford, leaving the front-line dockyards at Portsmouth, Plymouth and the Nore for maintenance and repair.

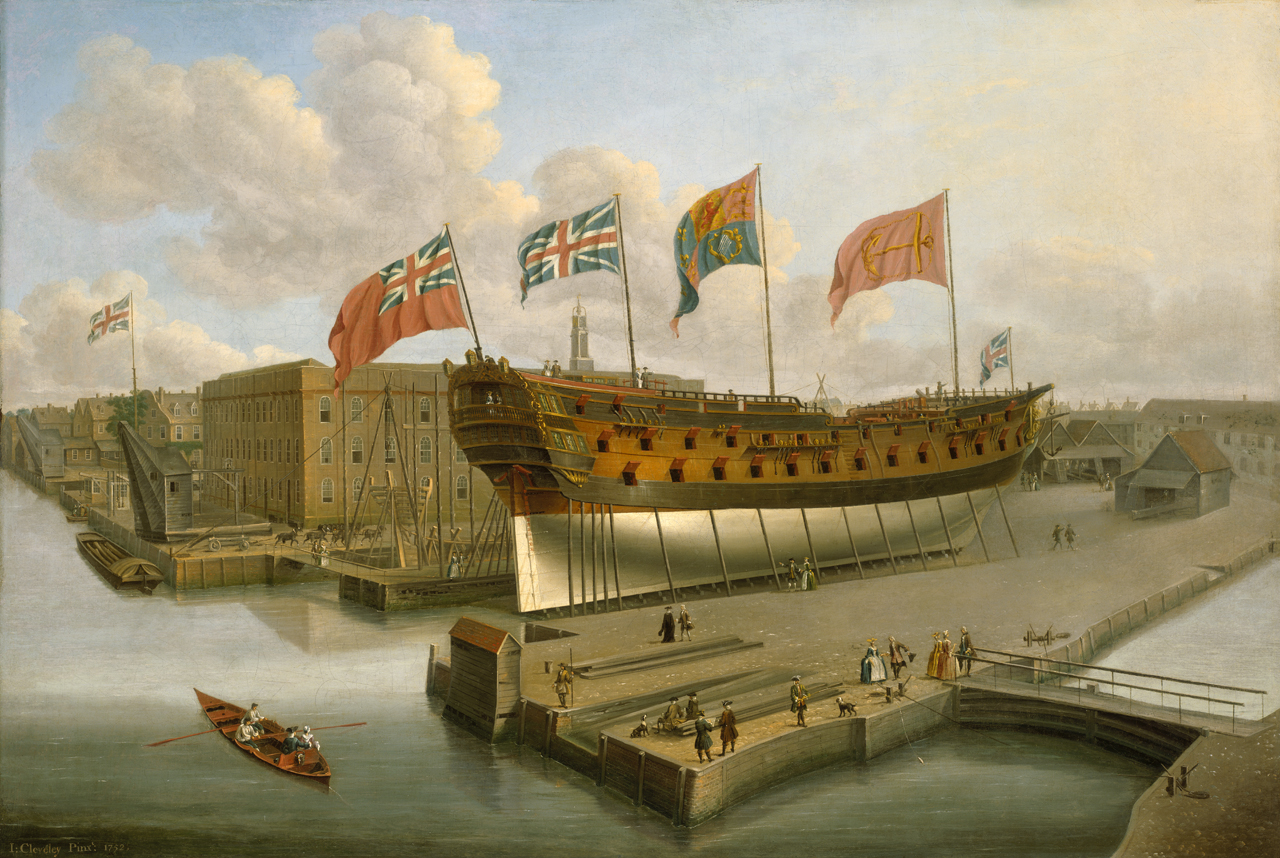
A newly built ship on the stocks at Deptford, c.1752; possibly the 70-gun HMS Buckingham, a third rate of the 1745 Establishment.

Owing to its proximity to the offices of the Navy Board, Deptford also specialised in new or experimental construction work. In the 1750s the first of a new generation of 74-gun warships were built there. In the 1760s and 1770s, various trials were undertaken involving the sheathing of ships' hulls with copper to try to prevent the damaging effects of Teredo worm infestations. Experiments were conducted into converting seawater into drinking water and extracting pitch from coal, among other things.

The yard was expanded northwards in the 1770s, enabling the addition of a second (and larger) mast pond, new mast houses and a sixth shipbuilding slip. A 1774 report described both large and small ships being built at Deptford, 'there being a sufficient flow of water for launching them, although not a sufficient depth at low water to lay the large ships on float'; (once launched, therefore, they were taken down river at the first opportunity). Smaller vessels such as frigates, however, could still be laid up at Deptford for repair or equipping, and in times of urgency it was possible to contract additional riggers from other yards on the Thames.

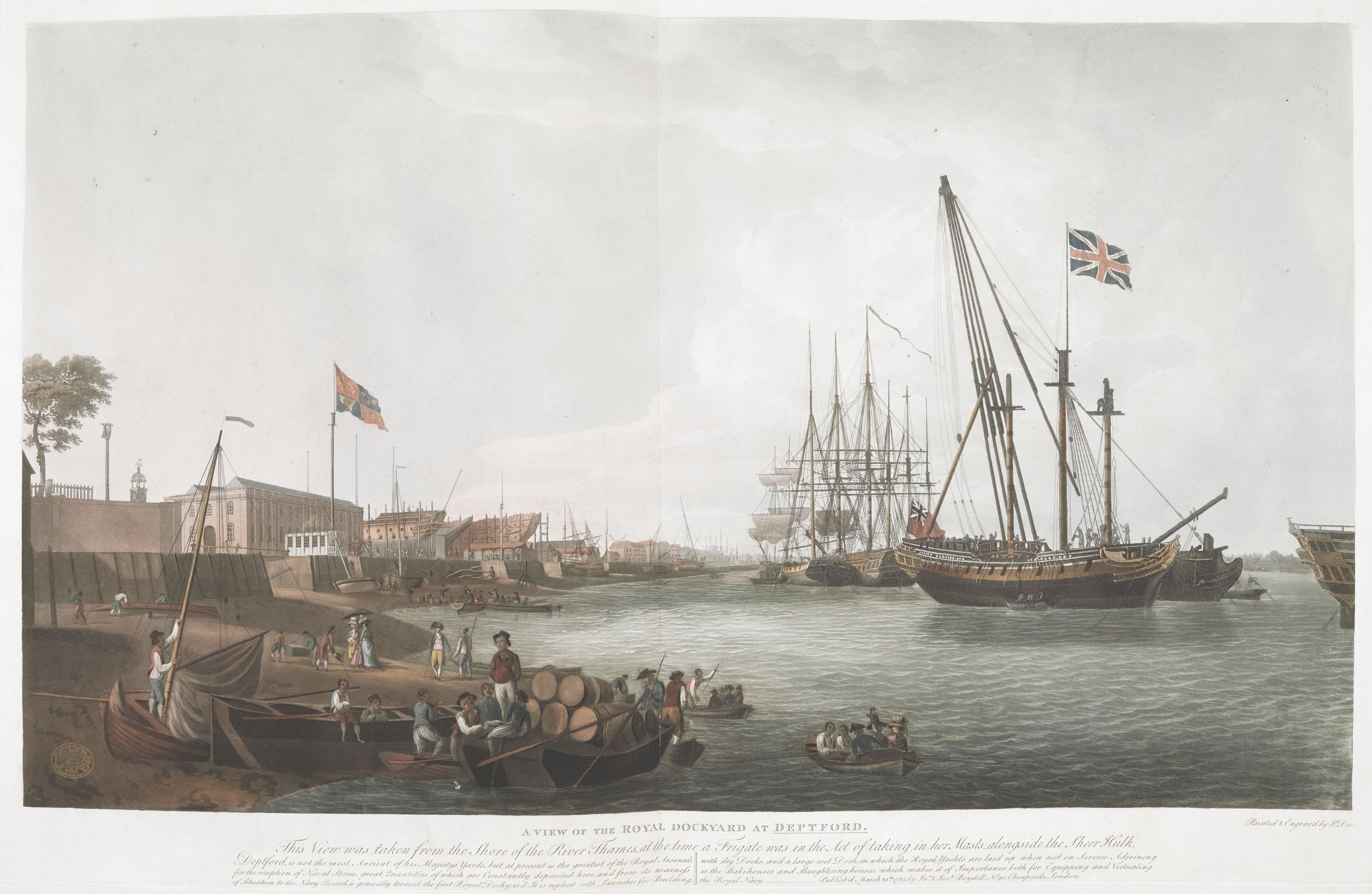
A sheer hulk pictured off Deptford Dockyard in 1789, fitting masts to a frigate.

Deptford was associated with a large number of famous ships and people. Several of the ships used by James Cook on his voyages of exploration were refitted at the dockyard, including HMS Endeavour, HMS Resolution and HMS Discovery, as were ships used by George Vancouver on his expedition between 1791 and 1795, HMS Discovery and HMS Chatham. HMS Bounty was refitted at the yard in 1787, as was HMS Providence, the vessel used by William Bligh on his second breadfruit expedition. Warships built at the yard include HMS Neptune and HMS Colossus, which fought under Nelson at the Battle of Trafalgar, and HMS Swiftsure, which was captured in 1801 and fought for the French at the battle.

=== Late-Georgian decline ===
The end of the Napoleonic Wars and the long period of relative peace that followed caused a decline in both the number of new ships demanded by the navy and the number that needed to be repaired and maintained. Deptford's location and the shallow riverine waters exacerbated the problem as work and contracts were moved to other royal dockyards. The yard had its location close to the main navy offices in London in its favour, but the silting of the Thames and the trend towards larger warships made continued naval construction there an unappealing prospect. Engineer John Rennie commented of the yard that

Ships-of-the-line which are built there cannot as I am informed with propriety be docked and coppered. Jury masts are put into them and they are taken to Woolwich, where they are docked, coppered and rigged, and I have been told of an instance where many weeks elapsed before a fair wind and tide capable of floating a large ship down to Woolwich occurred.

On 31 January 1821 the Admiralty issued an order with the effect that from that date only small maintenance work was to be carried out at Deptford. Nevertheless, Deptford continued to be used for experimental work: in 1822 HMS Comet, the Royal Navy's first steam-powered ship, was launched there. In 1827 the size of the dockyard was reduced when the mast pond and mast houses were annexed to the victualling yard (the main mast house was turned into a 'salt provision store').

The dockyard was largely shut down between 1830 and 1837, with only shipbreaking carried out there during that time; though the navy was reported to have kept a keel laid down in building slip No. 1, in apparent fulfilment of a lease from John Evelyn, who had made it one of the terms that a ship was always to be under construction at the yard. (HMS Worcester had been laid down at the yard in 1816 and was complete by 1831; but was only finally launched in 1843 when the slip was required for HMS Terrible.) The navy had to hastily lay a keel down in 1843 when it was discovered that the term was not being adhered to.

=== Victorian rebuilding ===
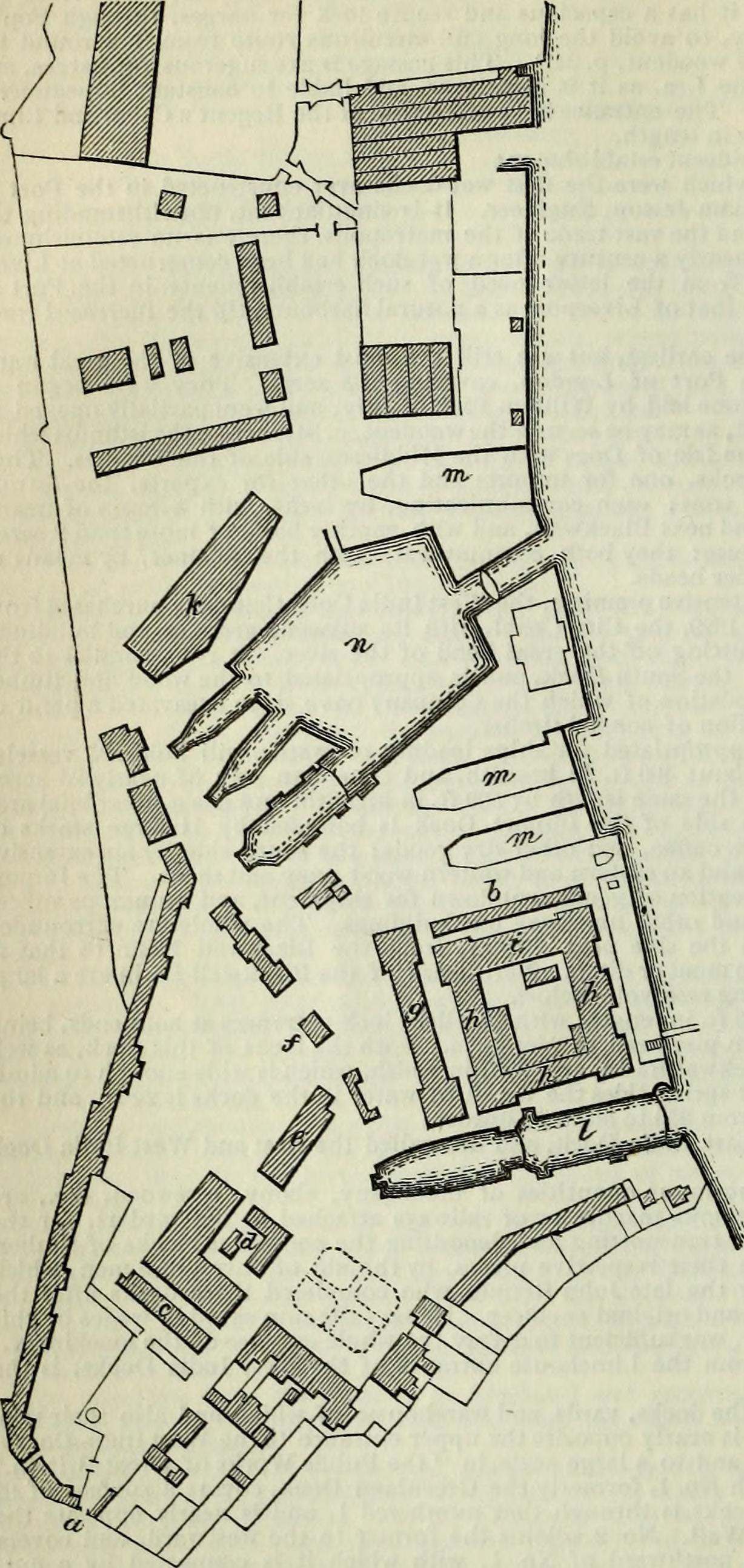
Deptford Dockyard, c.1844. Key: a) Yard gate; b) Spinning house; c) Shop; d) Smiths' shop; e) Sawpits; f) Pitch house; g) Rigging and sail house; h) Store houses; i) Ropery; k) Plank shed; l) Docks; m) Building slips; n) Basin.

The dockyard reopened in 1844 as a shipbuilding yard. (Small-scale warship construction had resumed in 1837, and continued for the next 32 years). Vessels launched at Deptford were fitted out at Woolwich Dockyard, where the navy had established its first steam factory (for building and installing marine steam engines). In 1838, Joseph Huddart's original stationary rope making machine had been installed in the north range of the storehouse quadrangle. The Great Dock was rebuilt (following a partial collapse) in 1839–41, and at the same time it was enclosed beneath a substantial timber roof. Then, from 1844 to 1846, the old shipbuilding slips were comprehensively rebuilt. The new slips were numbered: No.1 was immediately north of the basin and ran down to the river; No.2 and No.3 were adjacent to each other and ran into the basin; No.4 and No.5 were also adjacent to each other and ran down to the river just south of the basin. Nos. 4 and 5 were also roofed in timber, whereas Nos.1, 2 and 3 were all given cast iron roofs manufactured by George Baker and Sons of Lambeth. (The single dry dock linked to the basin was removed in 1844 as part of the rebuilding of the adjacent slips, Nos.2 and 3.)

In 1856, the Admiralty purchased the adjoining Sayes Court estate with a view to expanding the dockyard. In 1860 the Captain Superintendent was expressing the hope that they might soon start building larger vessels (three-deckers) in the yard. That year they were busy erecting plank sheds on the new ground to accommodate the large amounts of timber required for shipbuilding, and a new 'plank store and working shed' (with a mould loft on the upper storey) was under construction by the mast pond; however, following the introduction of ironclad warships it soon became apparent that the days of Deptford Dockyard were numbered, and in 1865 a parliamentary committee recommended the closure of the yard 'so far as shipbuilding is concerned'.

=== Closure ===
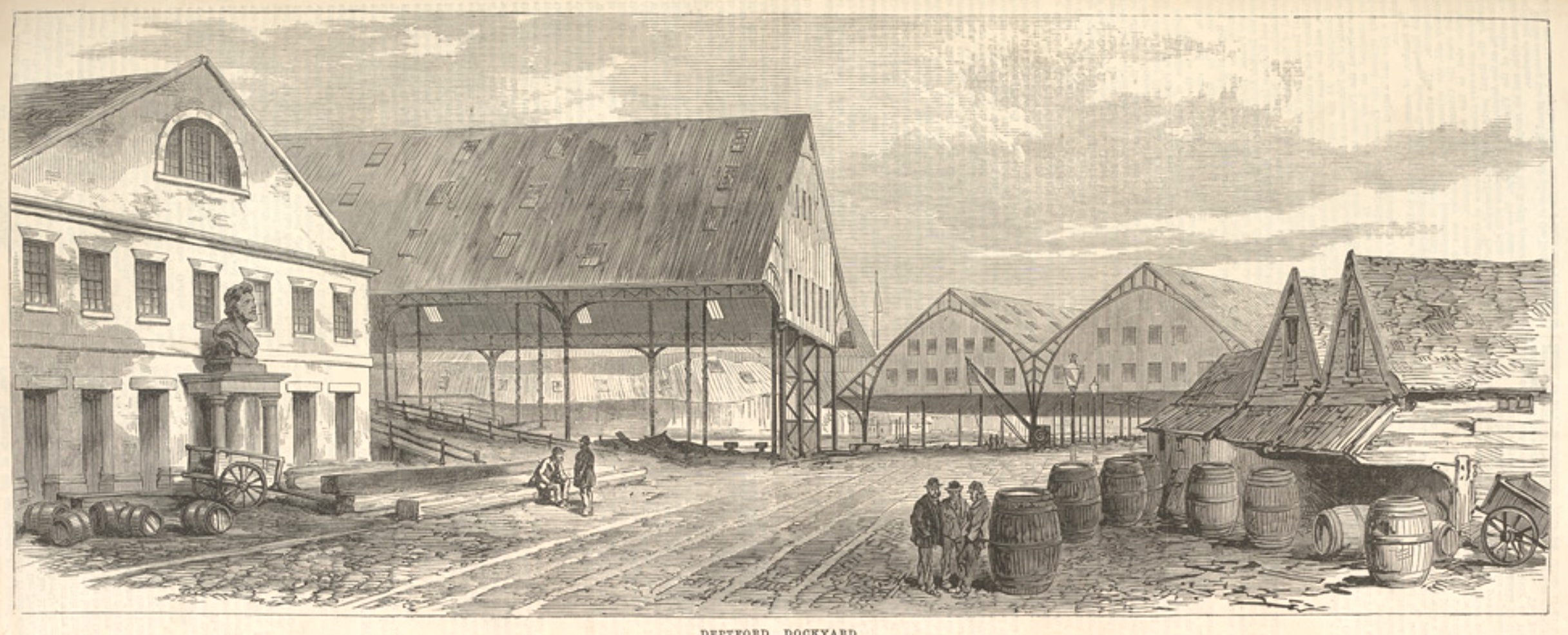
A view of the dockyard in 1869, looking towards the south-east. Seen from left to right are: plank store (with the figurehead of HMS San Josef), No. 1 covered slip, Nos. 2 & 3 covered slips, timber sheds.

Deemed surplus to requirements, Deptford Dockyard was closed on 31 March 1869. The screw corvette HMS Druid, launched on 13 March 1869, was the final ship built there.

Nevertheless, although Deptford ceased operating as a building yard, part of the site (namely everything to the north of No.1 Slip) was retained and remained in operation as a naval store depot, overseen by an Inspector of Naval Stores. As such, 'Deptford (Store Yard)' continued to be listed as a home dockyard in the 1870s-80s (albeit with a permanent workforce of just 28, plus forty or so hired labourers). Its main role was to serve as the central despatch point for all naval stores destined for overseas stations; but some manufacturing also continued on site into the 1880s, mainly in the sail loft, colour loft and joiners shop. By the mid-1890s, the management of Deptford Naval Store Yard had been fully merged into that of the neighbouring Royal Victoria Victualling Yard. In 1898, owing to a lack of available space, the naval stores were moved to new warehouse accommodation at the West India Docks (to be termed the Admiralty Depôt), and the Victualling Yard then expanded into the vacated area of the former Dockyard.

== Administration of the dockyard ==
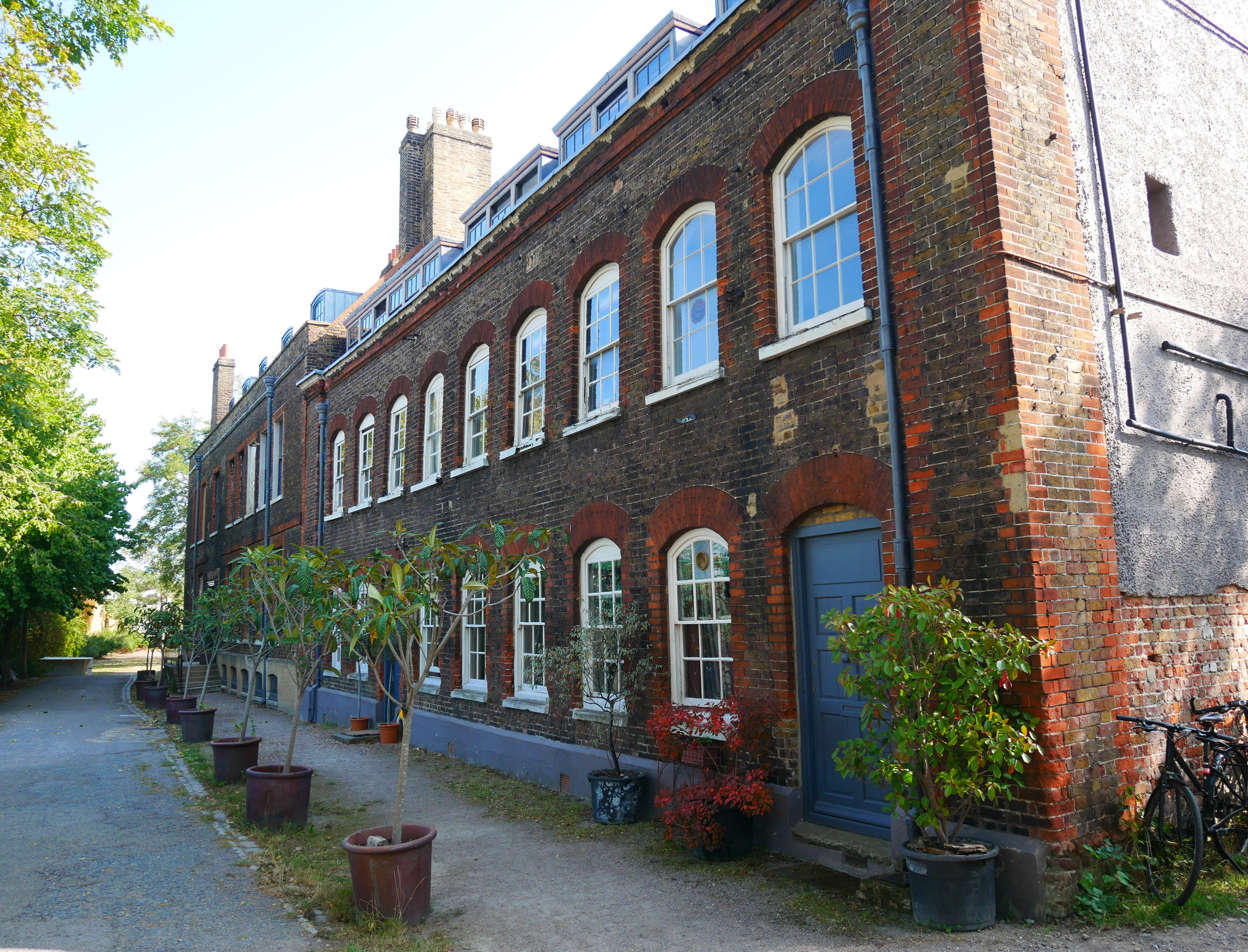
The surviving former Dockyard Office building, with the Master Shipwright's House beyond it.

The first naval administrators of dockyards during the early Tudor period were called Keepers of the Kings Marine, John Hopton was Keeper of the Kings Storehouses for Deptford and Erith dockyards as well as Comptroller of the Navy. The Master Shipwright became then the key official at the royal navy dockyards until the introduction of resident Commissioners by the Navy Board after which he became deputy to the resident commissioner. In 1832 the post of commissioner was replaced by the post of superintendent. At Deptford the Captain-Superintendent had oversight of all three local establishments: the dockyard, the victualling yard and the transport service.

=== Keeper of the Kings Storehouse at Deptford ===
Post holders included:

- 1513–1524, John Hopton (also Keeper at Erith Dockyard)
- 1524–1537, William Gonson (ditto)
- 1544–1545, William Wynter
- 1545–1546, Richard Howlett.

=== Resident Commissioner of the Navy, Deptford ===
Included:

- 1714–1739, Captain Henry Greenhill.
- 1740–1745, Captain Thomas Whorwood
- 1744–1745, Commodore Edward Falkingham (also resident commissioner of the navy at Woolwich Dockyard)
- 1746–1747, Captain James Compton. (ditto)
- 1747–1762, Captain William Davies, (ditto)
- 1806–1823, Captain Sir Charles Cunningham, KCH.

=== Captain Superintendent Deptford ===
- 1841–1851, Captain John Hill.
- 1853–1856, Captain Horatio Thomas Austin
- 1857–1863, Captain Claude Buckle.
- 1863–1876, Captain Henry Chads.

=== Master Shipwright Deptford dockyard ===
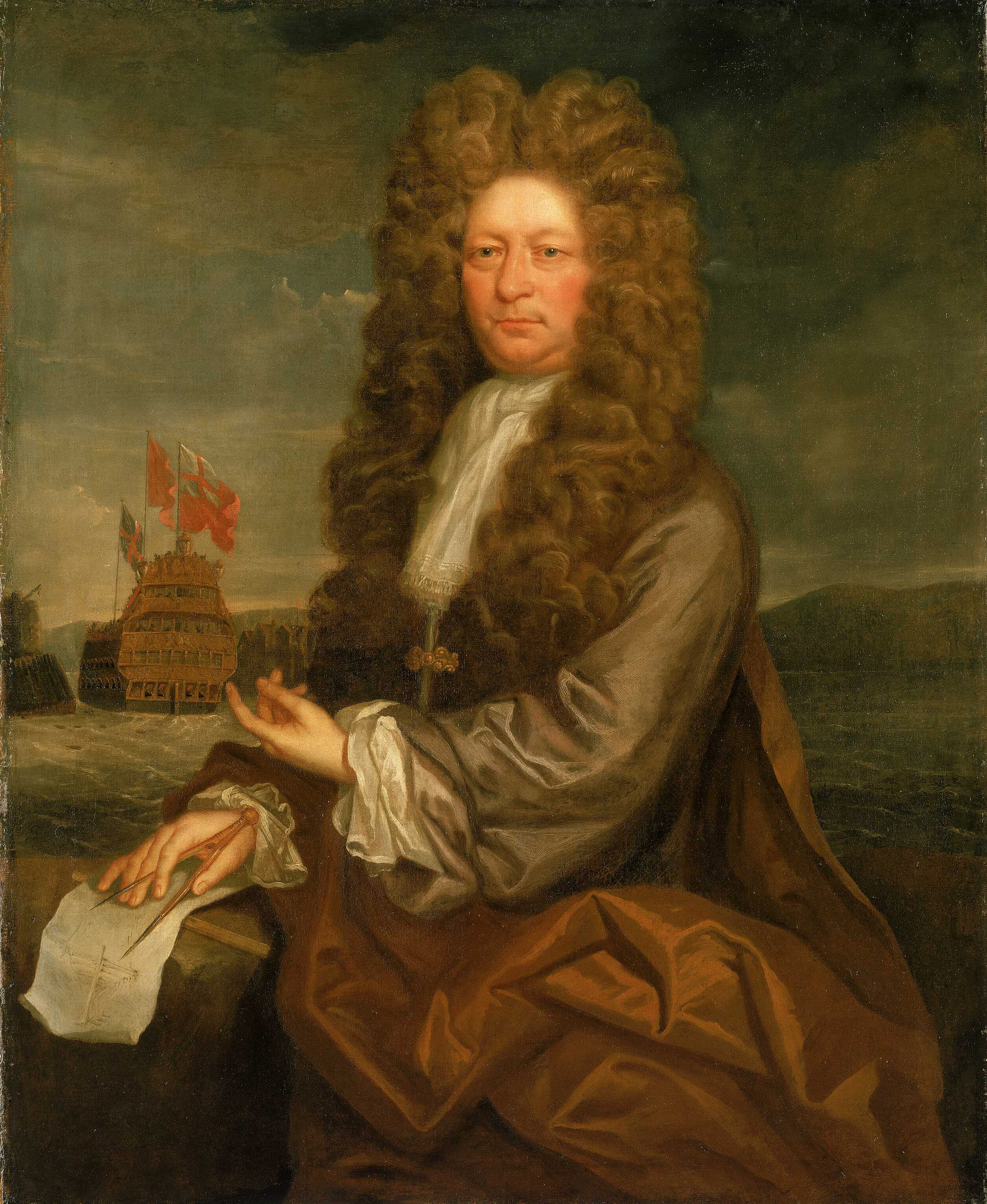
Fisher Harding built 39 ships during his time in office.

Incomplete list of post holders included:

- Peter Pett, 1550–September 1589.
- Joseph Pett, 1589–1606.
- William Burrell, 1619–1623
- Peter Pett, 1630–1652
- Christopher Pett, August 1647–March 1668.
- Jonas Shish, April 1668–November 1675.
- Fisher Harding, October 1686–November 1705.
- Joseph Allin, November–December 1705.
- Richard Stacey, July 1715–August 1727.
- Richard A. Stacey, August 1727–June 1742
- Joseph Allin, July 1742–June 1746.
- John Holland, June 1746–April 1752.
- Thomas Fellowes, May 1752–March 1753.
- Thomas Slade, March 1753–August 1755.
- Adam Hayes, August 1755–June 1785.
- Henry Peake, December 1785–March 1787.
- Martin Ware, March 1787–May 1795.
- Thomas Pollard, June 1795 – 1799.
- William Stone, July 1810–November 1813.
- Henry Chatfield, 1853–1860.

=== Master Attendant Deptford dockyard ===
This officer of the royal dockyards was appointed to assist at the fitting-out or dismantling, removing or securing of vessels of war, etc., at the port where he was resident. Post holders included:

- 1702 Feb-May, William Wright.
- 1702–1703, Thomas Jennings.
- 1703–1705, Thomas Harlow.
- 1705–1706, Richard Clarke.
- 1706–1707, John Knapp.
- 1712–1720, Thomas Harlow.
- 1720–1739, Walter Lunn.
- 1739–1744, John Goodwin.
- 1744, Nov-Dec, Piercy Brett.
- 1744–1747, Richard Dennis.
- 1747–1755, John Goodwin.
- 1755–1770, Edward Collingwood.
- 1770–1776, Thomas Cosway.
- 1776–1786, Roger Gastrill.
- 1786–1791, Benjamin Hunter.
- 1791–1803, Joseph Gilbert.
- 1803–1823, Charles Robb.
- 1823–1830, John Douglas.
- 1836–1850, George F. Morice.
- 1850–1852, Charles Wilcox.
- 1852–1864, Commander Edward J. P. Pearn.
- 1864–1867, Commander Cornelius T. A. Noddall.
- 1867–1870, Staff Captain Robert Calder Allen.

== After closure ==
Apart from the aforementioned Naval Store Yard (the northernmost part of the site, which was annexed to the Victualling Yard), the land occupied by the Dockyard was sold after its closure. Fifteen acres to the south-west (namely that part of the land that had been purchased in 1856) was sold back to William John Evelyn, who resolved to turn it into a public park. He planted the area with shrubs and trees taken from his grounds at Wotton House, erected a bandstand in the centre and another building to the side to serve as a museum to his ancestor Sir John. When he tried to place the park and museum in public ownership, however, he found that there was no appropriately constituted public body to receive the gift (the experience helped inspire his friend and contemporary Octavia Hill to found the National Trust).

=== Foreign Cattle Market ===
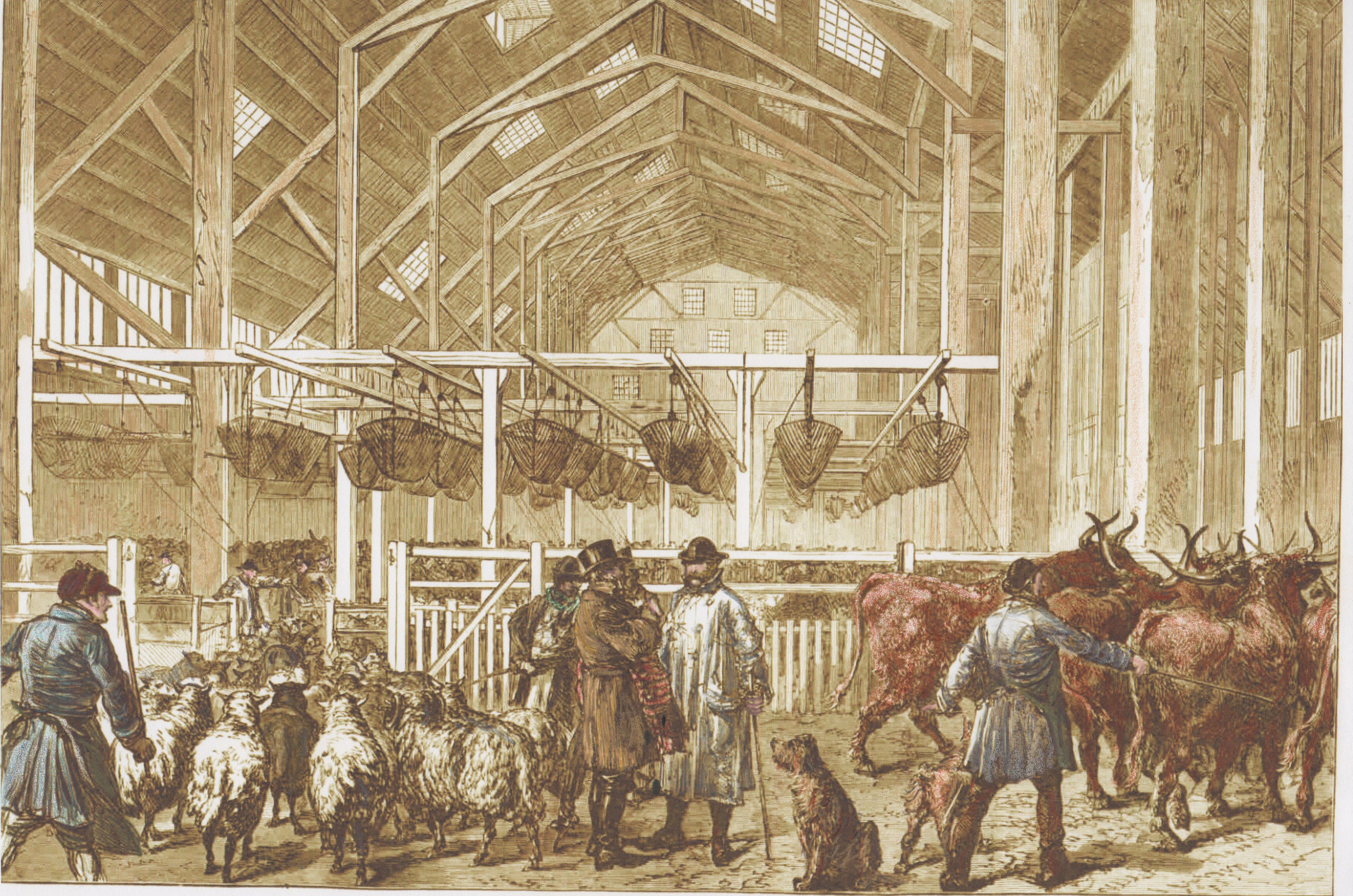
Foreign Cattle Market, 1872: the Central Shed (formerly No. 5 covered slip).

The rest of the area (amounting to about 30 acres) was bought by a Mr T. P. Austin for £70,000 in March 1869; he then 'almost immediately' re-sold 21 acres to the City of London Corporation for £91,500 (Austin was discovered to be the brother-in-law of the Solicitor to the Admiralty, and questions were asked in Parliament regarding the propriety of these transactions). The site was swiftly converted to become the Corporation of London's Foreign Cattle Market (providing space for the sale and slaughter of imported livestock, in accordance with the terms of the Contagious Diseases (Animals) Act, 1869). The old slips and docks were filled in and paved over, and the sheds covering them were joined and fitted up with animal pens, enough to accommodate 4,000 cattle and 12,000 sheep (with room, if required, for thousands more animals outside). Numerous slaughterhouses were set up, filling most of the ground floor area of the Quadrangle Storehouse and adjacent buildings. The Market opened for use on 28 December 1871. A later periodical described how "Deptford Dockyard, dismantled and degraded from its olden service to the Navy, has just been converted into a foreign cattle market and a shambles."

=== Supply Reserve Depot ===
The area's use as a Cattle Market continued until 1913, when (rendered obsolete by the advent of refrigerated transport) the market closed. Not long afterwards, in October 1914, the site was leased by the War Department to serve as a Supply Reserve Depot (SRD) for the Army Service Corps: a centralised facility for the storage and distribution of food and provisions for troops mobilised overseas. (It supplemented, and later replaced, a similar facility on the old Woolwich Dockyard site, which no longer had adequate space.) During the First World War, however, still more space was needed, and the War Department requisitioned all but 1.5 acres of W. J. Evelyn's public parkland for this purpose. The Depot and Victualling Yard were targets of a zeppelin attack in 1915. In 1924 the War Office purchased the land, which remained in use as No.1 Supply Reserve Depot.

In the mid-1930s Deptford was the Army's only Supply Reserve Depot, but it was judged to be highly vulnerable to air attacks; additional depots were hurriedly built at Barry and Taunton, but Deptford remained in operation and indeed suffered much bomb damage during the Second World War: seven V1 Flying Bombs hit the former Dockyard area in June–August 1944, and a V2-rocket hit, doing further damage, the following March.

After the closure of the Royal Victoria Victualling Yard in 1961, the Navy retained a small parcel of land adjoining the SRD to serve as a Royal Naval Store Depot (RNSD Deptford). Comprising 134,000 sq ft of covered and 75,000 sq ft of open accommodation, the depot handled the sending of naval freight through London's docks and airports and it contained warehouses for naval stores of stationery, furniture and other items, and garages and workshops housing the London area naval motor transport organisation. The RNSD continued in operation until 1984 (when it was closed in the wake of the cost-cutting Defence Review of 1981).

=== Disposal of the site ===
In 1984 the site was sold by the Ministry of Defence to Convoys Ltd (newsprint importers) and so became known as Convoys Wharf; later taken over by News International, it was used for the importing and storing of paper products. 28 years later they vacated the site, which now awaits redevelopment as a residential complex.

== Legacy ==
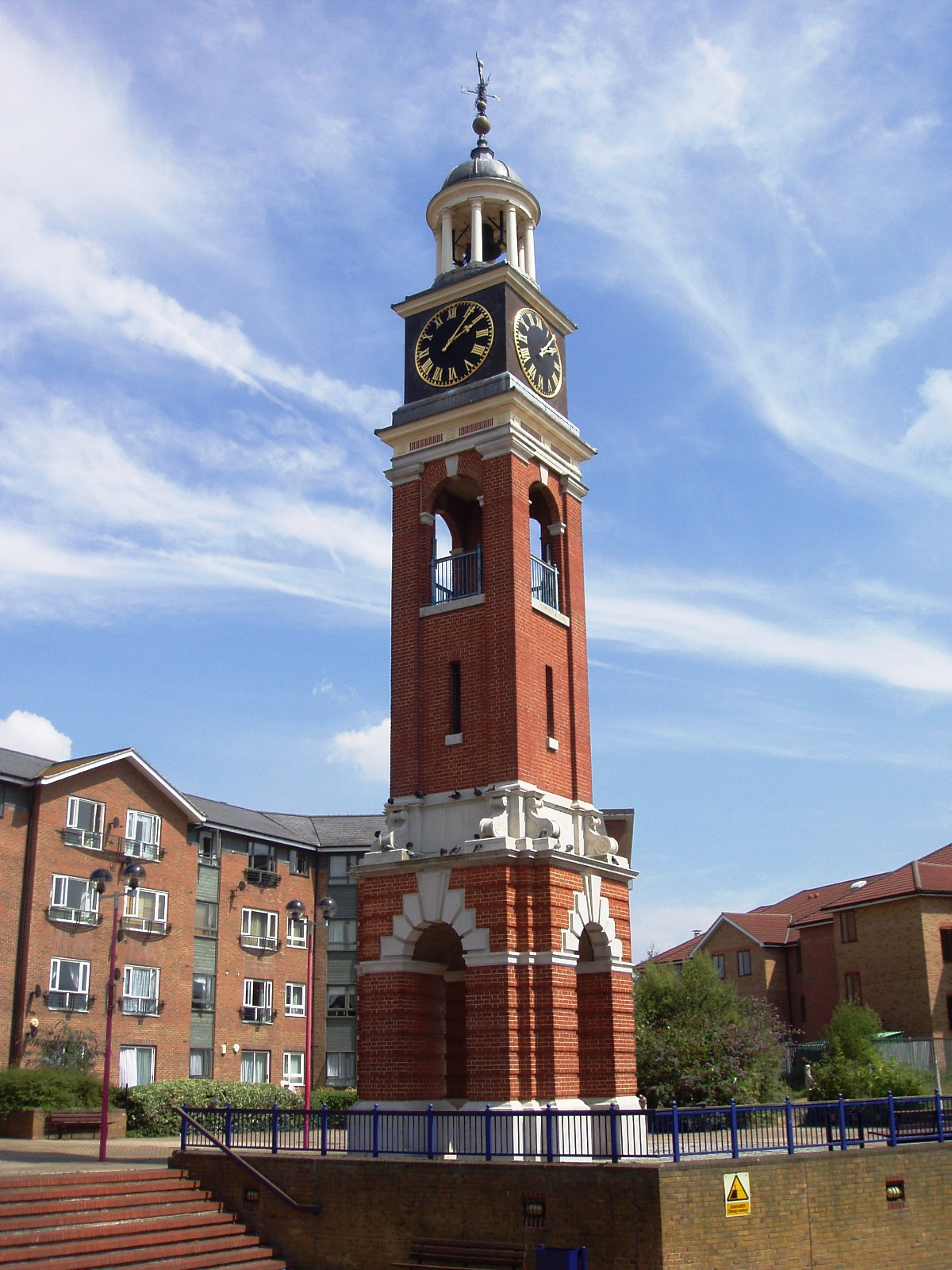
The clock and cupola from the old Storehouse (1720, demolished 1984) now stand in Thamesmead.

Many of the Royal Dockyard's buildings and features survived until the 1950s, but they have since almost entirely been lost or destroyed and the waterways have been infilled. Henry VIII's Great Storehouse of 1513 was demolished in 1954 (its bricks were used for repairs to Hampton Court Palace); and demolition of the adjacent eighteenth-century Storehouse buildings followed likewise in 1984.^{[d]} A few buildings have survived, however, most notably the Master Shipwright's House of 1708 (built by Joseph Allin), the nearby Office Building of 1720 and (from a late period of the dockyard's existence) the prominent Olympia Warehouse of 1846. (This building, of distinctive iron construction, was originally a double shed, built over dual slipways alongside the main Basin to enable shipbuilding to take place under cover). Moreover, remains of many of the yard's core features, including the slipways, dry docks, basins, mast ponds and building foundations, still exist below ground level and have been studied in archaeological digs. The subterranean remains of the Tudor Great Storehouse are now a Scheduled Ancient Monument.

=== The Lenox Project ===
In 2013 the Lenox Project put forward a formal proposal to build a full-size sailing replica of HMS Lenox, a 70-gun ship of the line originally built at Deptford Dockyard in 1678. The ship would actually be constructed on the dockyard site, and would form the centrepiece of a purpose-built museum which would remain as a permanent part of the development of Convoys Wharf.

By late 2015 the project had gathered momentum, with more detailed plans fitting the building of the Lenox into the overall development of this part of Deptford. The 2015 Feasibility Study identified the Safeguarded Wharf at the Western end of the Convoys Wharf site as the most suitable place for the dry-dock where the ship herself would be built; the existing but disused canal entrance could then be modified to provide an entrance for the dock as well as a home berth for the finished ship.

It is hoped that the Lenox will provide a focus for the regeneration of the area as the comparable replica ship Hermione did for Rochefort in France.

== The Victualling Yard ==
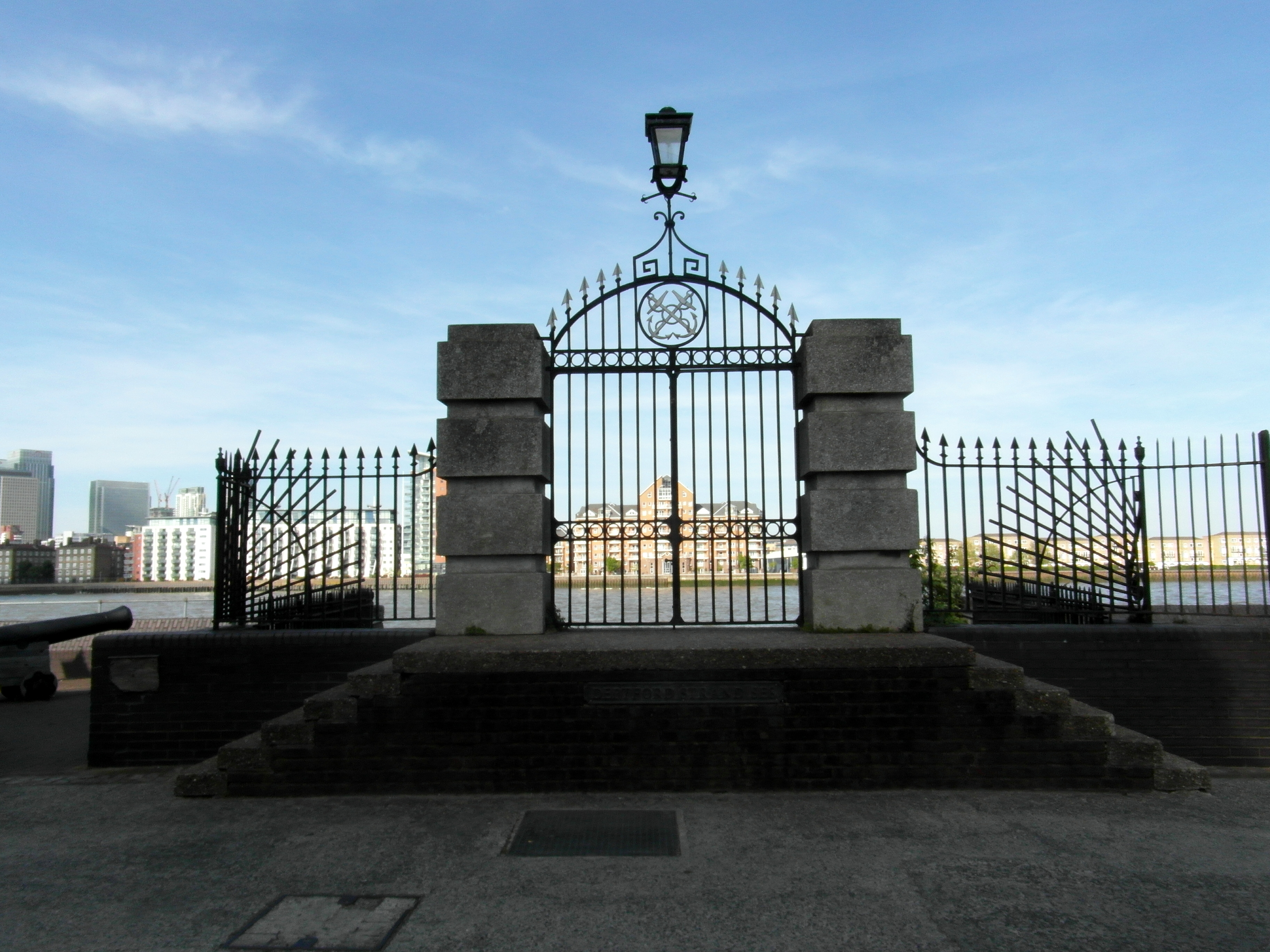
The Victualling Yard's river gate.

In the 17th century a Victualling Yard was established, independent of but adjacent to the main dockyard, to supply and victual the navy's warships. In 1743 the Victualling Commissioners took the decision to move their main depot to Deptford from Tower Hill, and they embarked on the construction of new facilities on the site: a cooperage, storehouses, slaughterhouses and facilities for baking and brewing.^{[c]} After a series of fires the yard was comprehensively rebuilt to a cohesive plan in the 1780s. In 1858 it was renamed the Royal Victoria Victualling Yard. As well as directly supplying ships in the Thames and the Medway, Deptford served as the main supply and manufacturing depot for the other Victualling Yards both at home and abroad.

The Royal Victoria Victualling Yard continued in operation for almost a century after the closure of the dockyard, dedicated to the manufacture and storage of food, drink, clothing and furniture for the navy. It closed in 1961 and a council estate was built on the site. A number of its buildings and other features were retained and can still be seen in and around the Pepys Estate, mostly dating from the 1770-80s.

Surviving buildings and structures of the Victualling Yard
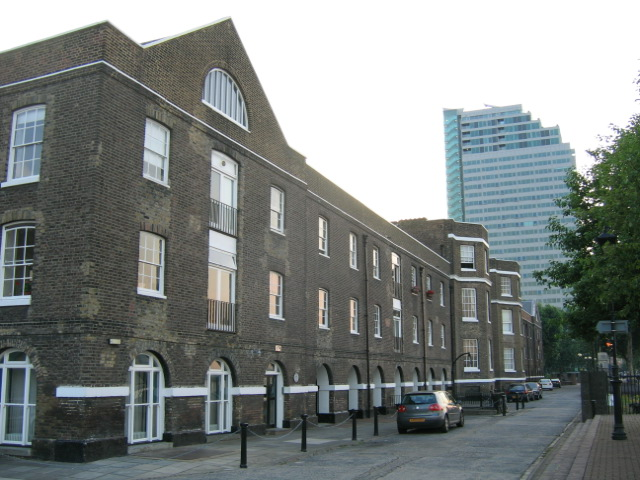
Riverside storehouse and administrative office.

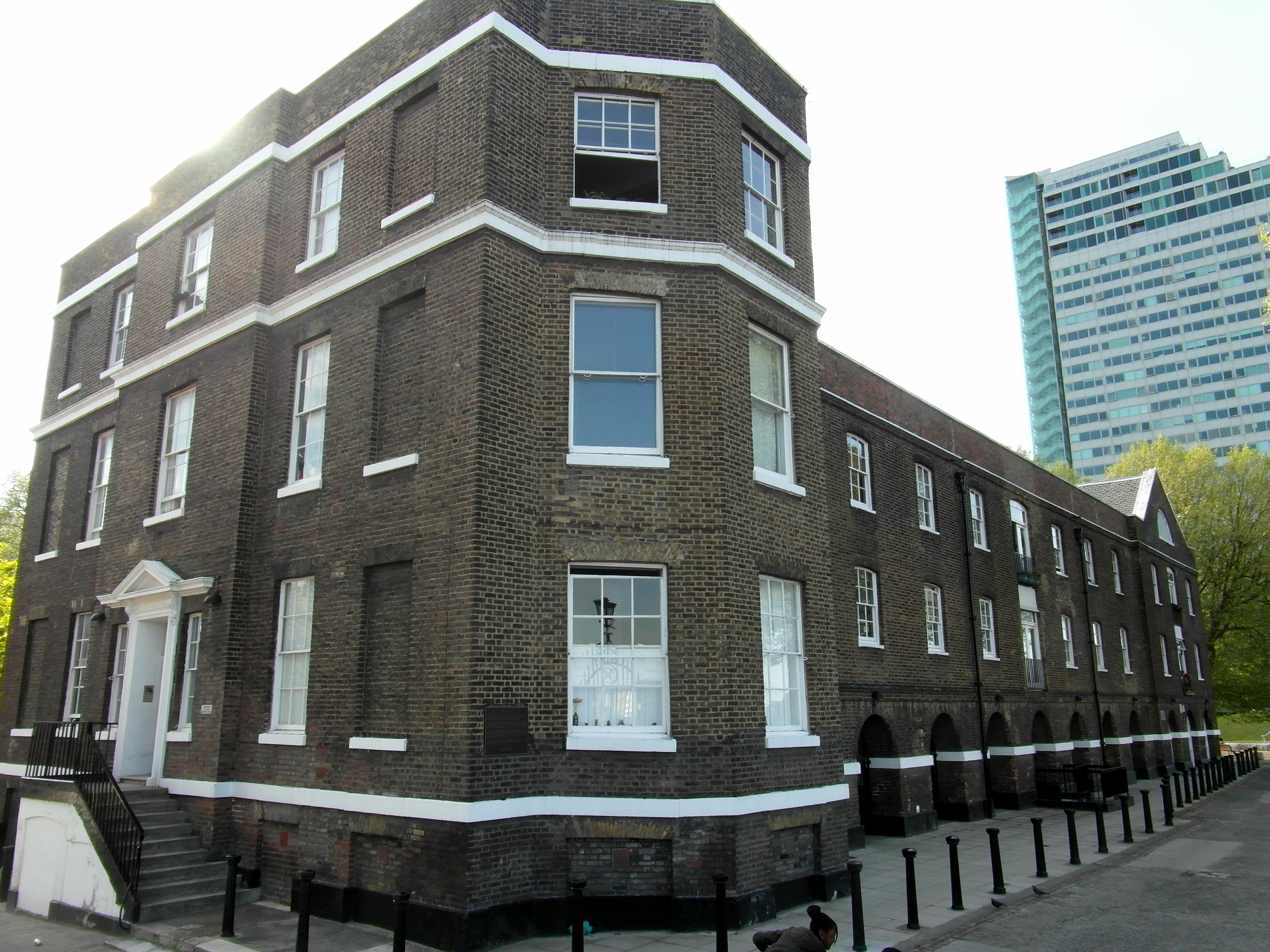
Superintendent's House and riverside storehouse.

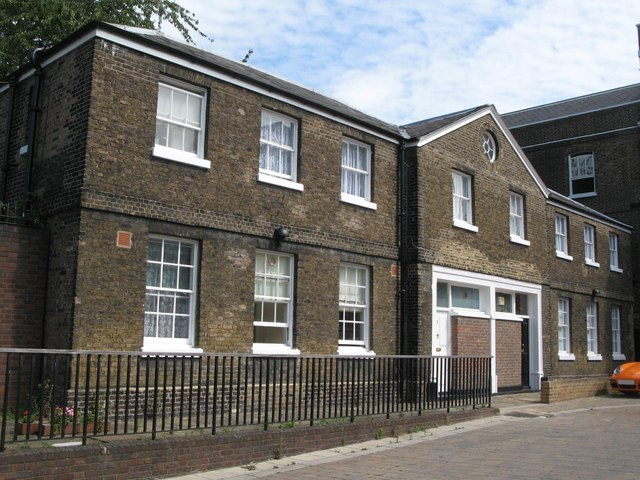
Stable block (behind the Superintendent's house).

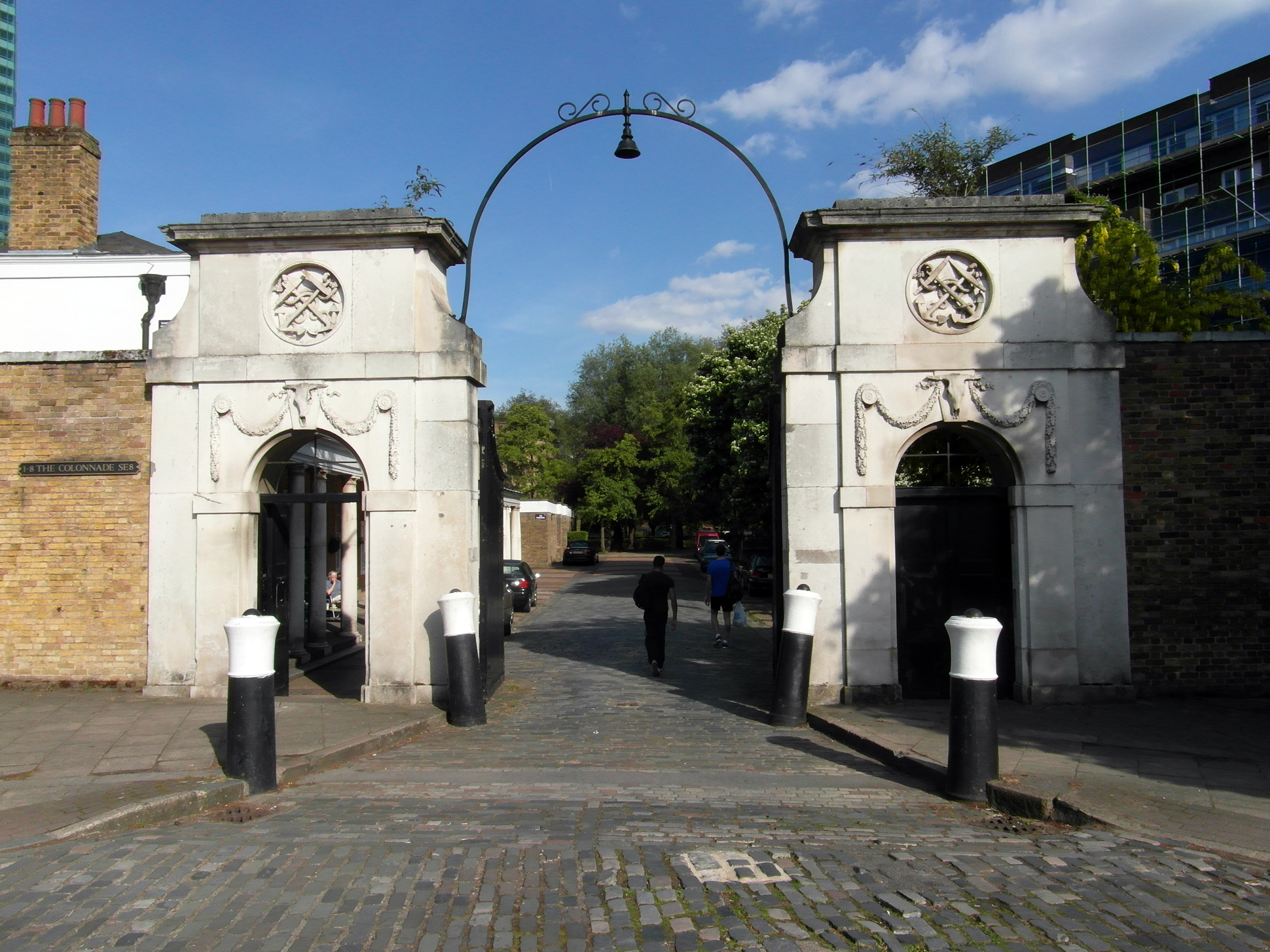
The Main Gate to the Victualling Yard (on Grove Street).

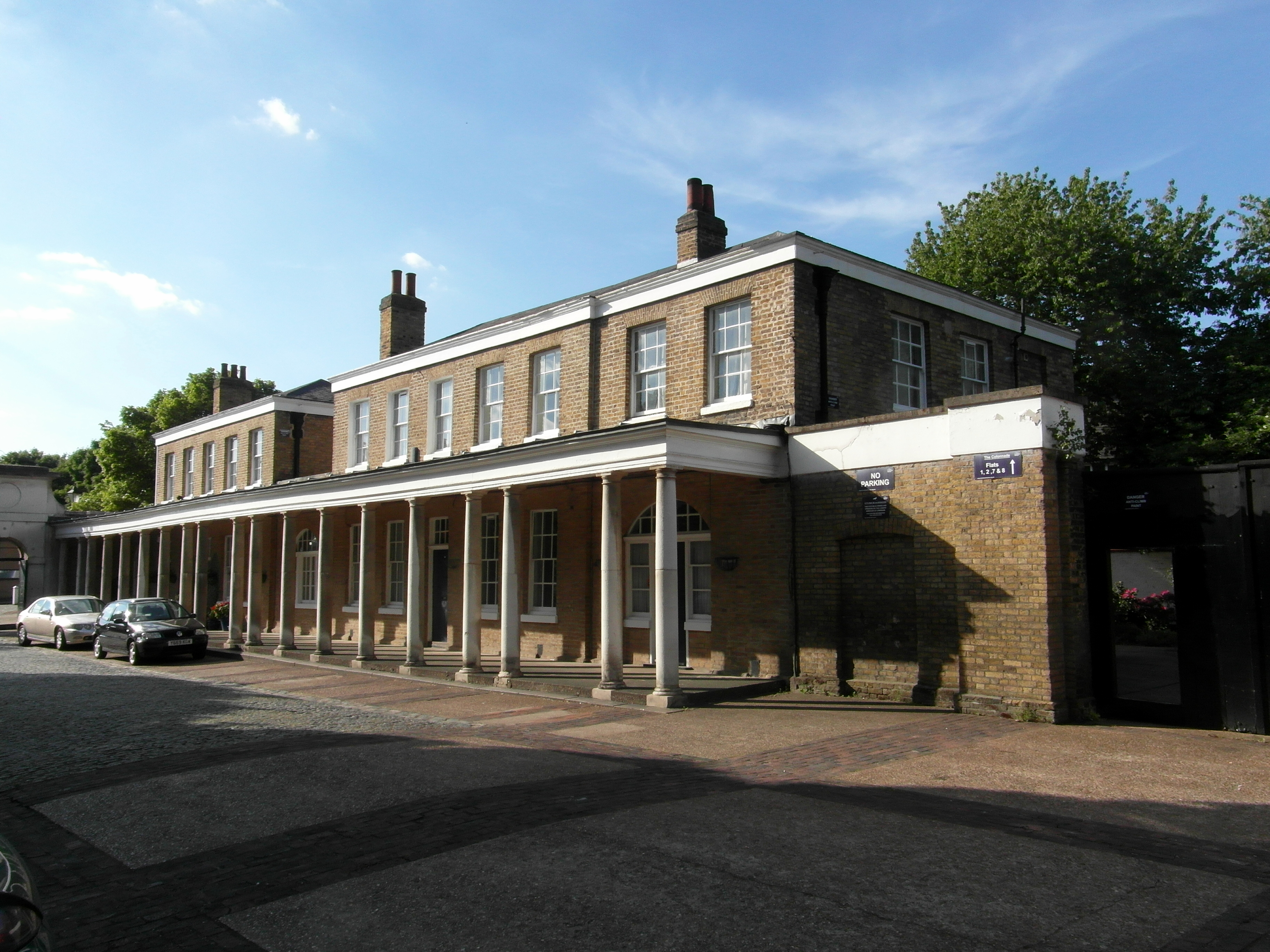
The Colonnade (houses and offices) by the main gate.

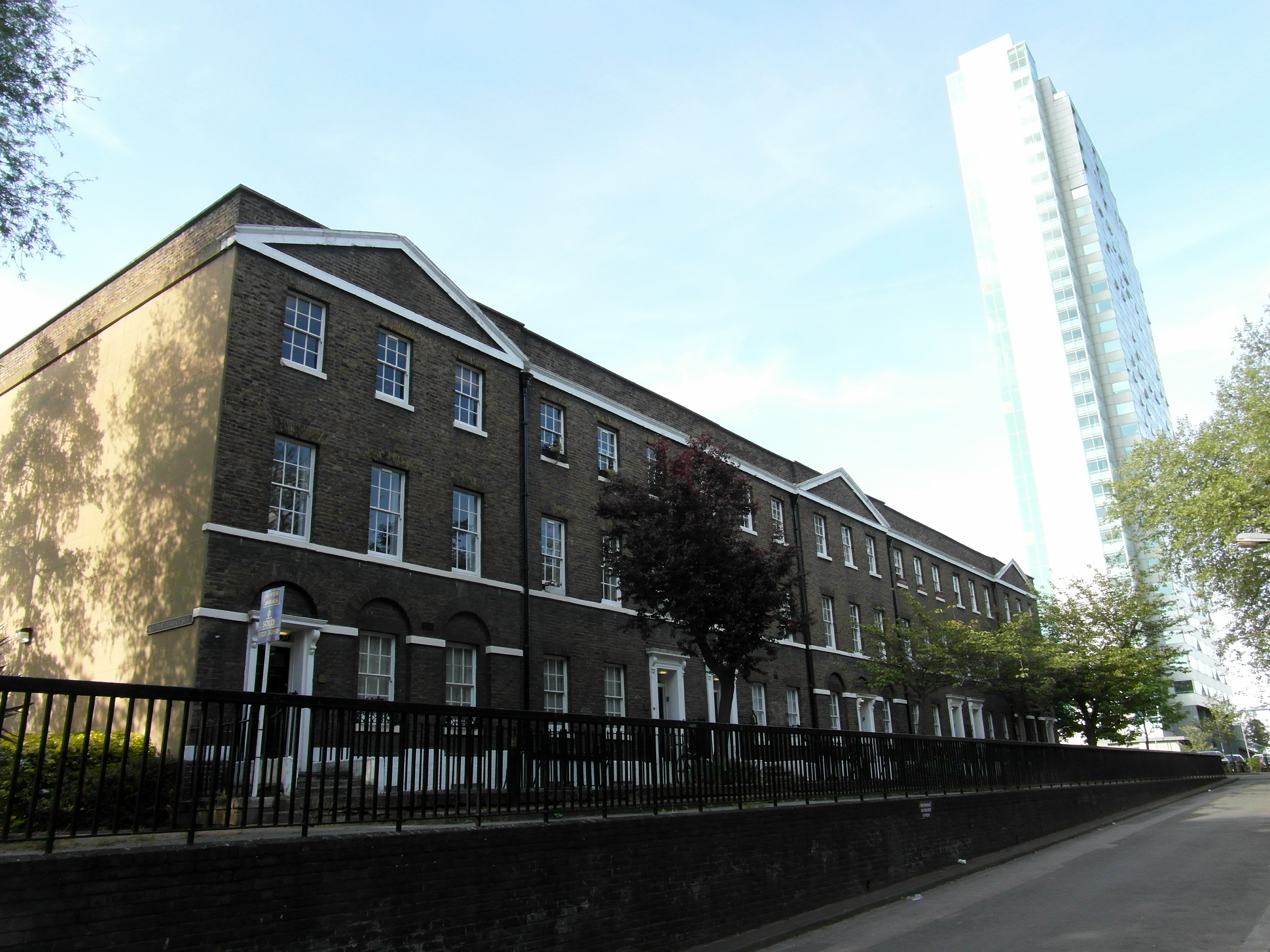
The Terrace (houses for senior officers of the yard).

== The Transport Yard ==
The Commissioners of the Board of Transport had their headquarters in Westminster, just off Canon Row; but they also maintained an office at Deptford which played a key role in the practical administration of their work. This involved providing such ships as might be required by the Army, the Navy, the Ordnance Board, the Commissariat, the Victualling Commissioners and others for the overseas transport of troops, horses, stores, supplies, ammunition and artillery (e.g. to a distant theatre of war, anchorage or military base). As well as procuring ships (merchant vessels) for the task, the Transport Office was responsible for seeing that they were skippered, crewed, loaded and prepared for the voyage (as well as managing the logistics of their ongoing and return voyages, and any manoeuvres that might be required in the interim). In 1808–09, during the Napoleonic Wars, the Board was managing a fleet of over a thousand vessels. For certain periods of time it also had responsibility for wounded servicemen and for prisoners of war.

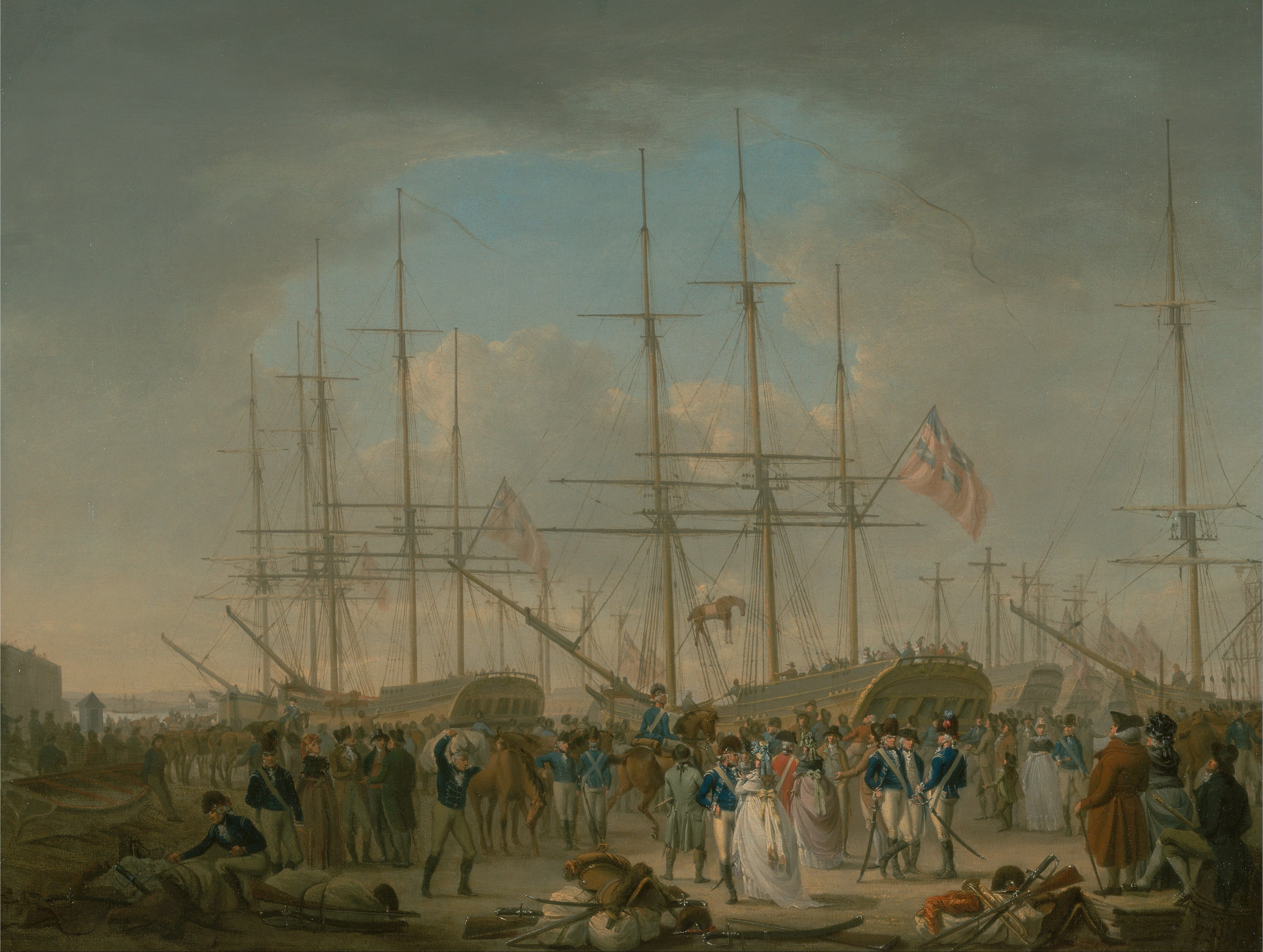
Hussars Embarking at Deptford by William Anderson (1793). The painting shows transport ships lined up across the river from the dockyard, ready to convey horses and cavalrymen to the French Revolutionary Wars.

For the most part, vessels required by the Transport Board were chartered, and the contract usually stipulated that they be brought to Deptford in the first instance to be presented there to the Board's representatives. The office at Deptford was staffed by a Resident Agent, an Inspecting Agent, a Shipwright Officer and a Storekeeper; these worked closely with the Master Shipwright and other officers of the Dockyard to inspect, value and prepare the ships for service. The Resident Agent corresponded daily with the Transport Board in Westminster, keeping them informed of all ship movements and transactions.

By 1800 the Transport Board was renting premises at Dudman's Dock (immediately to the north of the Victualling Yard), including a storehouse and wharf, a storekeeper's house, and offices for the Agents and storekeeper; they also had use of the dock (which was a large basin directly connected to the Thames) and other on-site amenities. This arrangement enabled transports to come alongside and be loaded with supplies (previously, the vessels had had to remain moored in the river while smaller craft brought them their stores and provisions). Purchase of the freehold of the site was discussed, but this did not proceed; instead the premises were leased from Mr Dudman (along with a pair of dwelling-houses for the senior officers, on the other side of the main road). In 1828 it was announced that, following the cessation of shipbuilding, the Royal Dockyard was to be 'reduced to a transport yard and a depôt for receiving stores'. The Agent for Transports and his staff duly relocated to the nearby dockyard, and in 1831 the Navy Board offered up for sale the remainder of the lease on the Dudman property, describing it as 'valuable Waterside Premises, lately the Transport-Yard, adjoining His Majesty's Victualling-Yard at Deptford'.

Later the Resident Transport Officer was accommodated in the Victualling Yard; by 1860 the Transport Establishment, Dockyard and Victualling Yard were all overseen by the Captain-Superintendent.

== Plan of the Georgian Dockyard ==
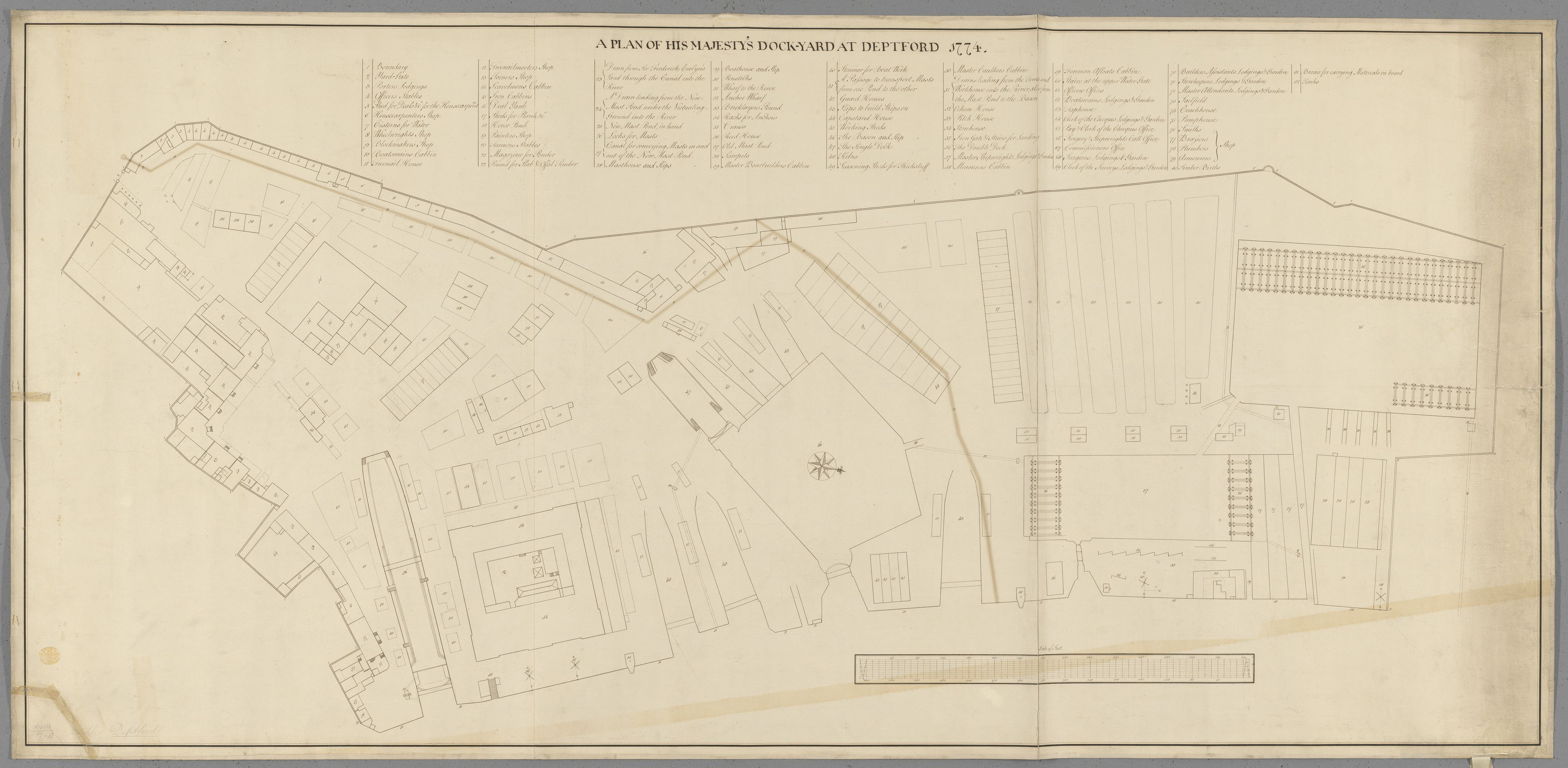
Plan of the Dockyard dated 1774. The wet dock is in the centre, with its own dry dock and three building slips. To the left of the wet dock are two more slips, the Quadrangle Store and the double dry dock (bottom left). To the right of the wet dock is another slip, the old mast pond, boat house and mast house, with the new larger mast pond top right. Plank sheds, timber berths and saw pits cover much of the rest of the site; various workshops are to be found in the area inside the main gate (top left) and the officers' houses, gardens and offices stand along the south boundary (far left).

== Notes ==
a. Dry dock gates existed at Chatham and Woolwich by the early part of the seventeenth century. Nicholas Rodger considers the introduction of dock gates as marking "...the invention of the true dry dock [which was] a very important development. It was to become one of the key technical achievements underpinning English sea power." The first foreign true dry dock, described as 'a l'anglaise', was ordered at by the French at Rochefort in 1666, nearly a century after the English.

b. Evelyn was able to convince the Treasury to pay him £350 to cover the necessary repair work to his house after the Russians' stay, after a survey of the damage was made by Sir Christopher Wren, the Surveyor of the King's Works.

c. By the 1790s the Victualling Board had its headquarters at Somerset House, together with the Navy and Transport Boards.

d. Storehouses were required for storage of all the raw materials and goods necessary for building and fitting out a ship. The 1513 Storehouse was a rectangular building of brick construction c.50m x 10m and two stories high. It stood parallel to the river, on the river front, some 40 metres upstream of the (extant) Master Shipwright's House. (Both buildings are visible in Cleveley's painting of HMS St Albans, above.) The original Storehouse was added to, bit by bit over time, and in the early part of the 18th century it became the north range of a quadrangle of Storehouse buildings. This Storehouse complex, with cupola and clock atop the southern range, formed a prominent landmark for ships on this part of the river for over 200 years.
