= HMS Royal Sovereign (1786) =

Ship of the line of the Royal Navy

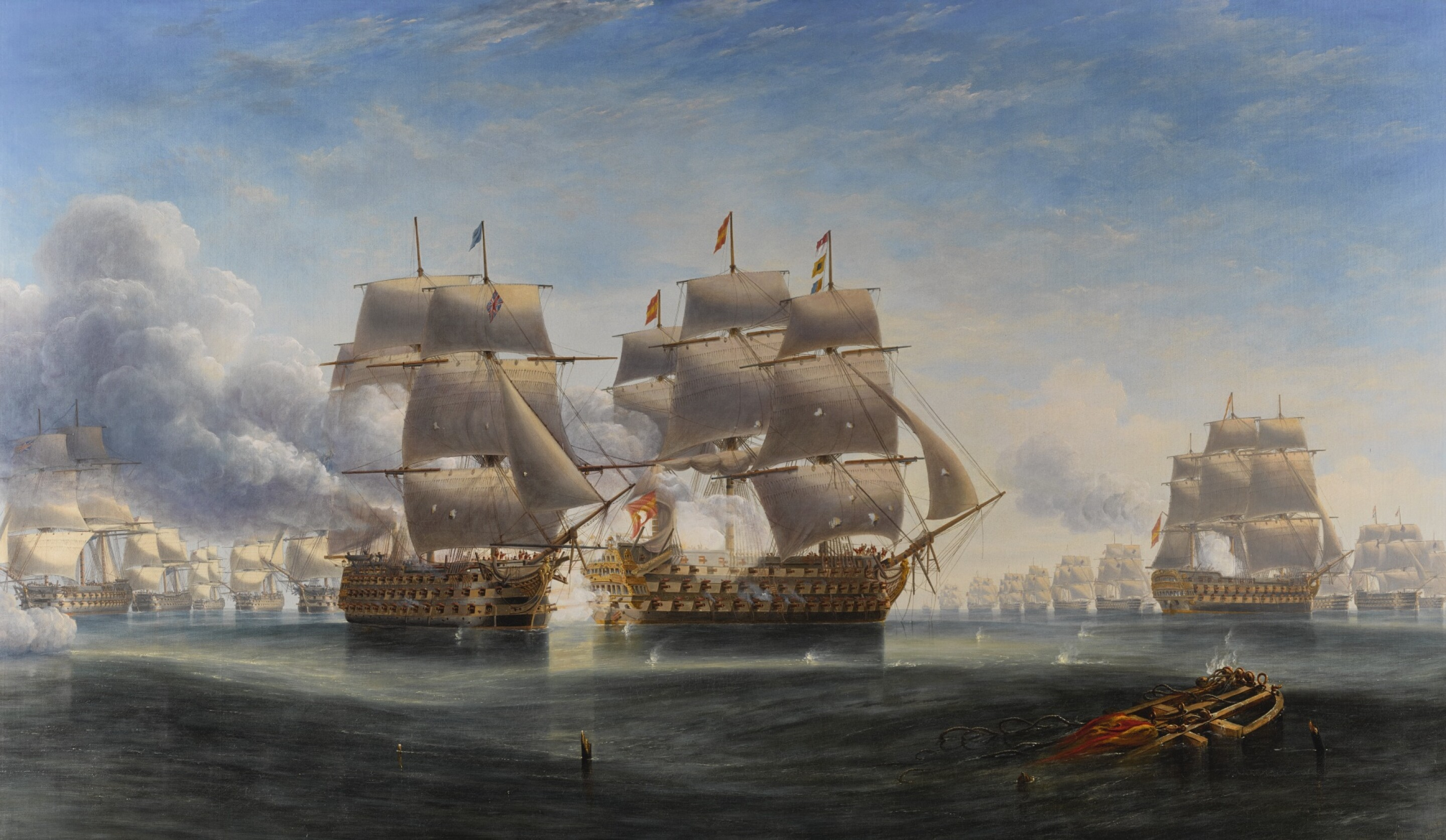
- Royal Sovereign (centre-left) at the Battle of Trafalgar

History

Great Britain
- Name: Royal Sovereign
- Ordered: 3 February 1772
- Builder: Plymouth Dockyard
- Laid down: 7 January 1774
- Launched: 11 September 1786
- Renamed: Captain, 17 August 1825
- Honours and awards: Participated in: Glorious First of June; Cornwallis's Retreat; Battle of Trafalgar
- Fate: Broken up, 1841
- Notes: Harbour service from 1826

General characteristics
- Class & type: 100-gun first-rate ship of the line
- Tons burthen: 2175 (bm)
- Length: 183 ft 10 1/2 in (56.0 m) (gundeck)
- Beam: 52 ft 1 in (15.88 m)
- Depth of hold: 22 ft 2 1/2 in (6.8 m)
- Propulsion: Sails
- Sail plan: Full-rigged ship
- Armament: Gundeck: 28 × 32-pounder guns; Middle gundeck: 28 × 24-pounder guns; Upper gundeck: 30 × 12-pounder guns; QD: 10 × 12-pounder guns; Fc: 4 × 12-pounder guns

HMS Royal Sovereign was a 100-gun first-rate ship of the line of the Royal Navy, which served as the flagship of Vice-Admiral of the Blue Cuthbert Collingwood at the Battle of Trafalgar. She was the third of seven Royal Navy ships to bear the name. She was launched at Plymouth Dockyard on 11 September 1786, at a cost of £67,458, and was the only ship built to her design. Because of the high number of Northumbrians on board the crew were known as the Tars of the Tyne.

== Construction ==
Royal Sovereign was a 100-gun first rate ship of the line, designed by the John Williams (Surveyor of the Navy) in 1772.

Royal Sovereign was ordered on 3 February 1772 to be built at Plymouth Dockyard by the Master Shipwright Thomas Pollard. The long nature of her construction meant that the master shipwright changed twice, with Pownoll being replaced by John Henslow in February 1775, and Henslow in turn handing over to Thomas Pollard in November 1784. She was laid down on 7 January 1774 and launched on 11 September 1786 with the following dimensions: 183 feet 10 1/2 inches (56 m) along the gun deck, 150 feet 9 1/8 inches (46 m) at the keel, with a beam of 52 feet 1 inch (15.9 m) and a depth in the hold of 22 feet 2 1/2 inches (6.8 m). She measured 2,175 29/94 tons burthen. The fitting out process for Royal Sovereign was completed in September 1787, but she was still only partly fitted for sea.

== In service ==
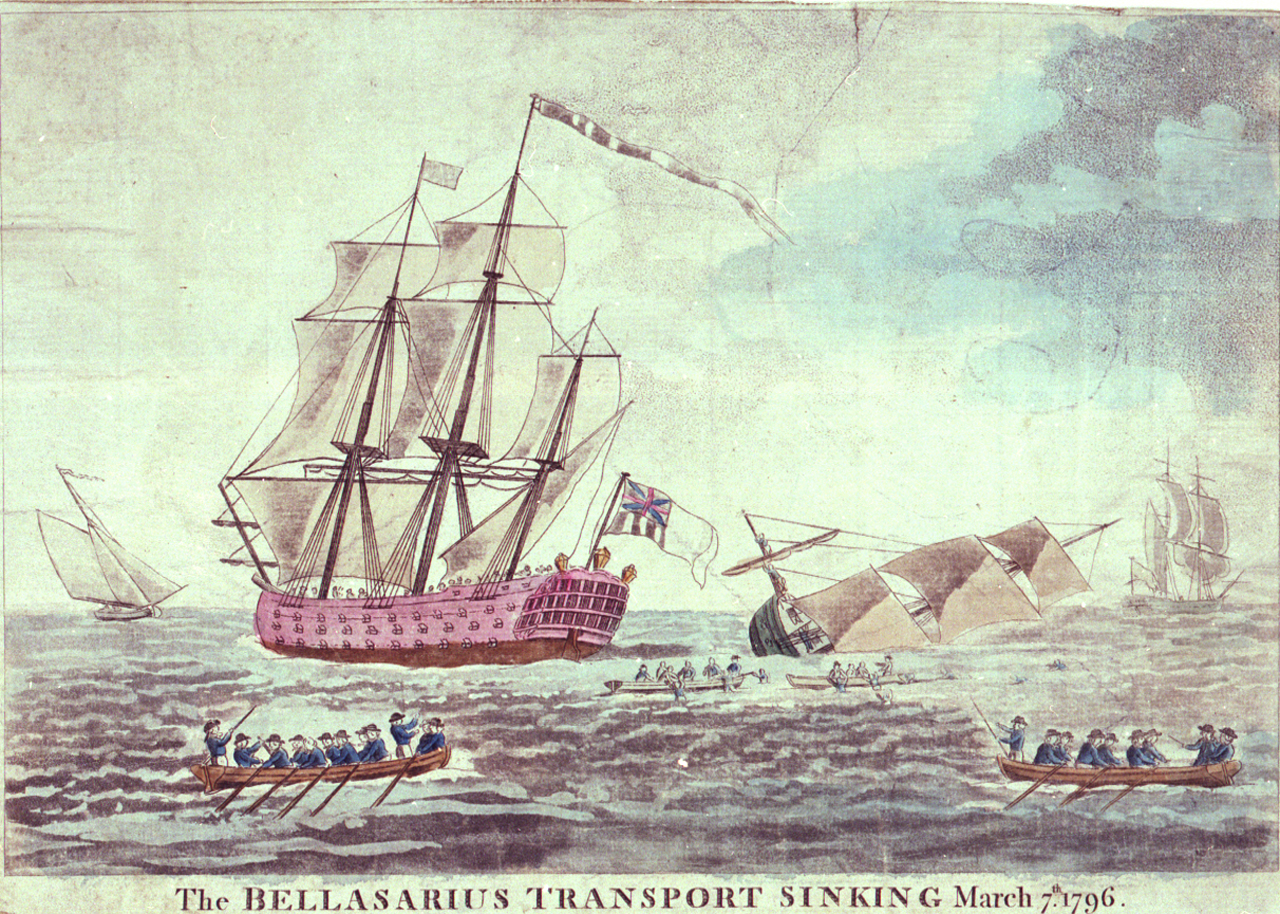
Royal Sovereign immediately after her collision with Bellisarius on 17 March 1796

Royal Sovereign was part of Admiral Richard Howe, Earl Howe fleet at the Glorious First of June, where she suffered 14 killed and 41 wounded. On 16 June 1795, as the flagship of Vice-Admiral William Cornwallis, she participated in Cornwallis's Retreat. On 17 March 1796 the transport ship Bellisarius collided with her and sank. With a Mr Barge as her master, Belisarius was carrying troops and their dependents to the West Indies. Barge and about 110 persons were saved. Royal Sovereign arrived at Gibraltar, under command of Capt. Malcome, on 20 February 1804 after an 8-day voyage from off Ushant.

== Trafalgar ==
At the Battle of Trafalgar on 21 October 1805 Royal Sovereign, under Vice-Admiral of the Blue Cuthbert Collingwood, led the lee column of the British fleet commanded by Vice-Admiral of the White Lord Nelson which engaged a Franco-Spanish fleet. Royal Sovereign was the first ship in the British fleet to go into action due to her hull being recently re-coppered just prior to the battle; in the light winds present that day she pulled well ahead of the rest of Nelson's fleet. Fougueux fired the first shots of the battle when she began firing at the approaching Royal Sovereign at 11:50 am. At exactly midday Royal Sovereign broke through the Franco-Spanish line of battle between Santa Ana and Fougueux, during which Nelson, leading the weather column on HMS Victory, pointed to Collingwood's ship and said "See how that noble fellow Collingwood carries his ship into action!" At roughly the same moment Collingwood remarked to his flag captain, Captain Edward Rotheram: "What would Nelson give to be here?"

As she passed by Santa Ana, Royal Sovereign under Collingwood's orders raked the Spanish ship of the line with a devastating double-shotted broadside. The two ships proceeded to engage in an intense hours-long duel for most of the battle, with Santa Ana taking fire from other British ships passing through the Franco-Spanish line, including HMS Mars and HMS Tonnant, while nearby French and Spanish warships fired on Royal Sovereign. Santa Ana ultimately suffered 97 killed and 141 wounded after battling Royal Sovereign and HMS Belleisle, while Collingwood's ship lost her mizzenmast and mainmast while the vessel's foremast was badly damaged and much of Royal Sovereign's rigging was shot away. At about 2:20 pm Santa Ana struck her colours to Royal Sovereign.

Shortly after Santa Ana's surrender a boat came from Victory carrying Lieutenant Alexander Hills, who reported that Nelson had been badly wounded. Collingwood realised that he might have to take command of the rest of the British fleet, and with his ship being "perfectly unmanageable" by 3:00 pm he signalled for Euryalus to take Royal Sovereign in tow. Euryalus towed her round to support the rest of the British fleet with her port side guns, and Royal Sovereign engaged the Franco-Spanish vanguard under Counter-admiral Pierre Dumanoir le Pelley as it came about to support the allied centre. Fire from the lead Franco-Spanish ships shot away the cable between Royal Sovereign and Euryalus, and the latter proceeded to sail towards Victory. Royal Sovereign exchanged fire with the arriving vanguard until Collingwood rallied several relatively undamaged British ships around Royal Sovereign, and Dumanoir gave up any attempt to recover some of the British prizes and sailed away with his ships at 4.30pm.

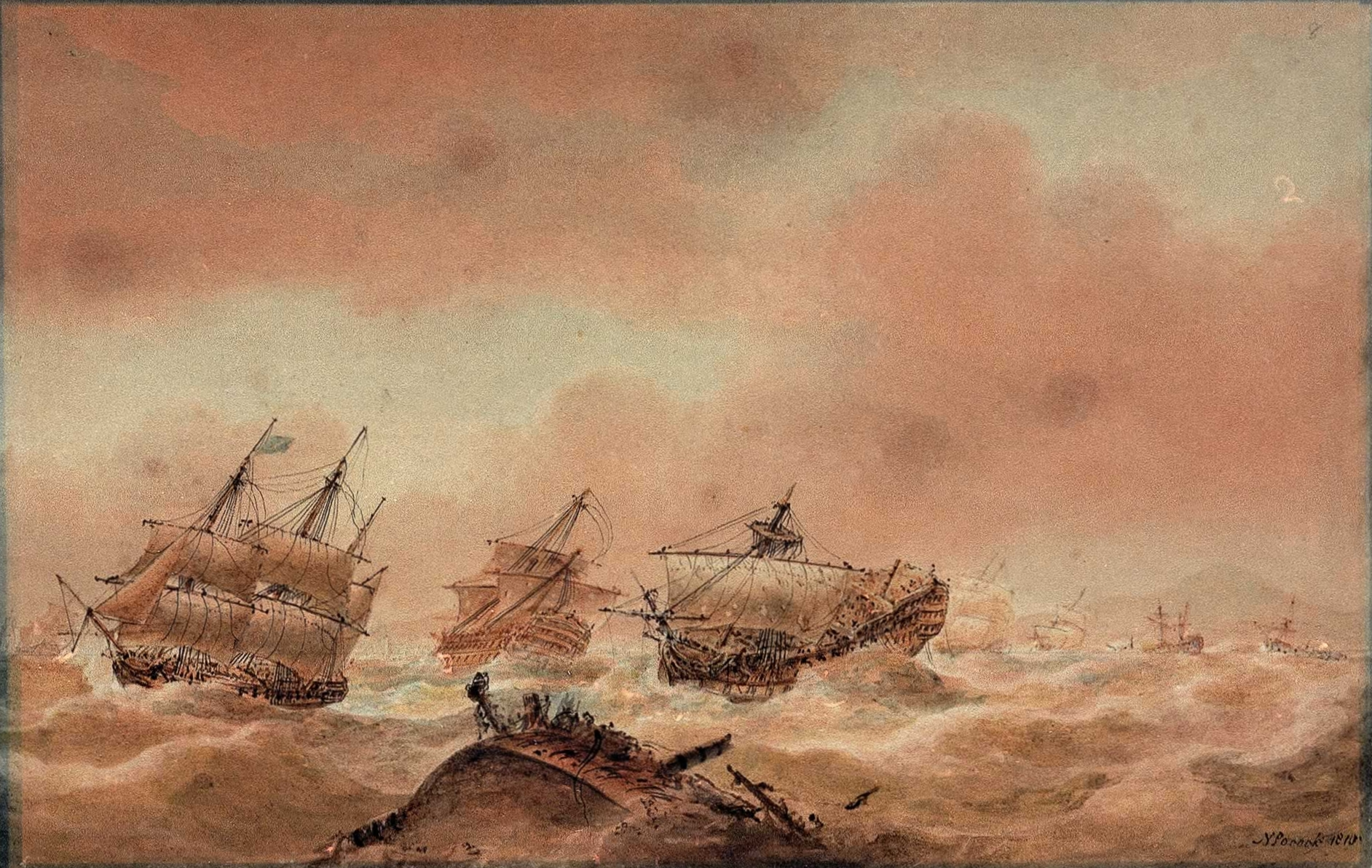
Royal Sovereign disabled and under tow by Euryalus on 22 October 1805

At 4.40 pm one of Victory's boats, carrying Captain Henry Blackwood and Hills, came alongside Royal Sovereign. Blackwood reported Nelson's death to Collingwood. This left Collingwood in command of the British fleet. With a storm approaching, Collingwood disregarded Nelson's final order to bring the fleet to anchor and ordered Blackwood to hoist the signal to all ships to come to the wind on the starboard tack and to take all prizes and disabled British vessels in tow. Royal Sovereign was by now virtually uncontrollable and as she had most of her masts shot away was unable to make signals. As a result just before 6:00 pm Collingwood transferred himself and his flag to Euryalus which sent a cable across and took Royal Sovereign in tow for second time. At the end of the battle Collingwood signalled from Euryalus for the rest of the fleet to prepare to anchor. HMS Neptune took over the tow on 22 October and was replaced by HMS Mars on 23 October. At Trafalgar Royal Sovereign lost one lieutenant, her master, one marine lieutenant, two midshipmen, 29 seamen and 13 marines killed, along with two lieutenants, one marine lieutenant, one master's mate, four midshipmen, her boatswain, 69 seamen and 16 marines wounded.

== After Trafalgar ==
Royal Sovereign returned to duty in the Mediterranean the next year and remained on the blockade of Toulon until November 1811, when she was ordered to return home to the Channel Fleet. In 1812 and 1813 she was under the command of Rear Admiral James Bissett serving under Admiral Keith.

She was credited with the capture on 5 August 1812 of the American ship Asia, of 251 tons, which had been sailing from St. Mary's to Plymouth with a cargo of timber. Royal Sovereign shared the proceeds of the capture with all the vessels in Keith's squadron, suggesting that what happened was that Asia sailed into Plymouth unaware that the War of 1812 between Britain and the United States had broken out and was seized as she arrived, the formal credit going to the flagship. (Note: A first-class share was worth £9 10s 10d; a sixth-class share, that of an ordinary seaman, was worth 2s 6d.)

== Fate ==
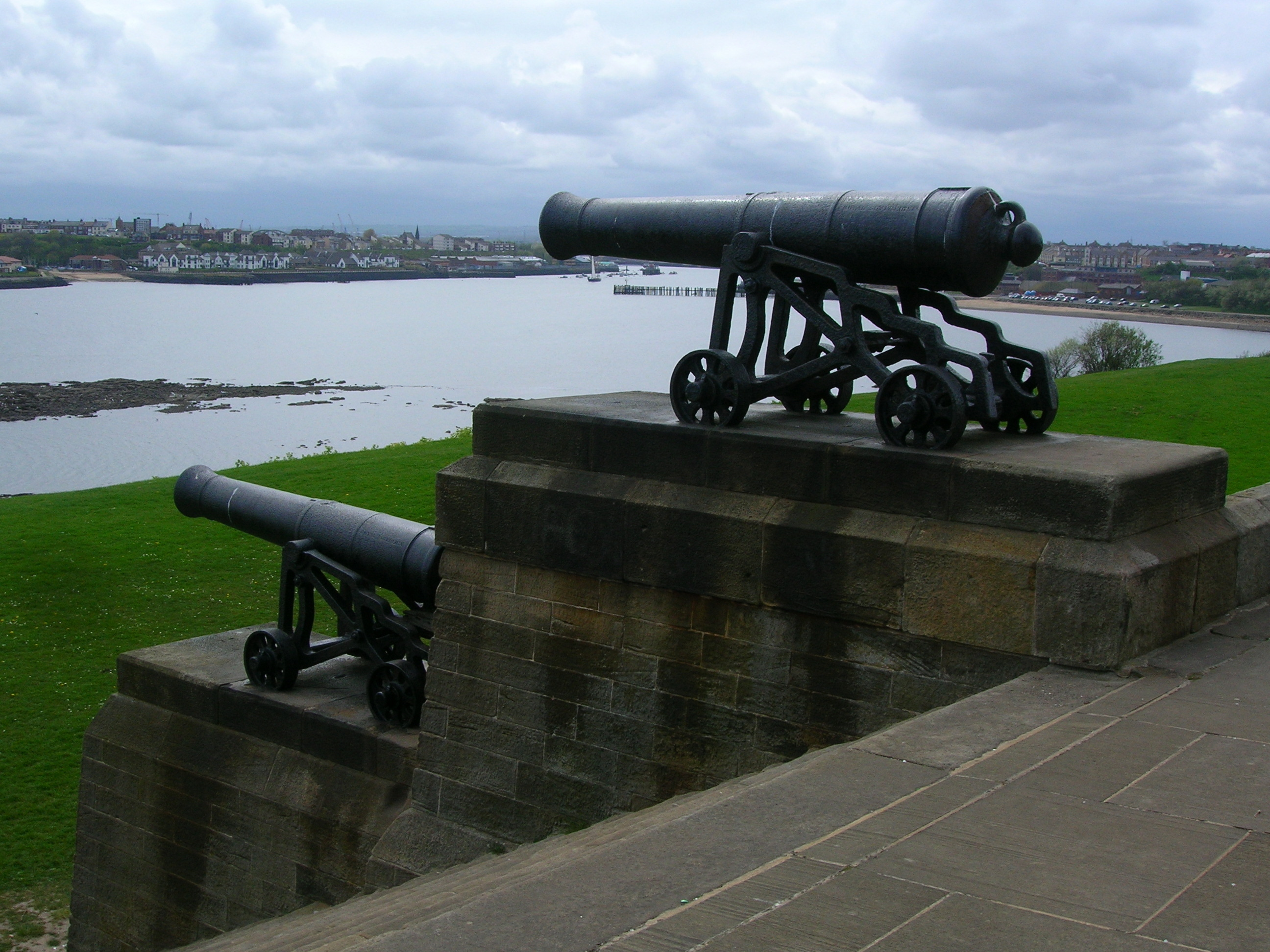
Guns from Royal Sovereign installed in the Collingwood Monument on Tyneside

After her useful active life she was converted to harbour service as a receiving ship at Plymouth before being renamed HMS Captain on 17 August 1825. Hulked in June 1826, Captain was finally broken up at Plymouth, with work being completed on 28 August 1841. Four of her guns were saved and are incorporated in the Collingwood Monument in Tynemouth.
