= HMS Comet (1822) =

History

United Kingdom
- Name: Comet
- Namesake: Comet Encke
- Builder: Deptford Dockyard
- Laid down: 21 November 1821
- Launched: 23 May 1822
- In service: 1822–1869

General characteristics
- Displacement: 239 long tons (243 t)
- Length: 35.1 m (115 ft 1.9 in) overall 30.8 m (101 ft 0.6 in) PP
- Beam: 3.7 m (12 ft 1.7 in)
- Propulsion: Steam engine with paddle wheels
- Speed: 7.5 knots (13.9 km/h; 8.6 mph)

HMS Comet, a wood-hulled paddle tug completed in 1822, was the first steam ship built for the Royal Navy.

Comet was built by Boulton, Watt & Co at the yards in Deptford, just outside London. She was ordered as a tug, for towing ships out of harbour when the wind was not enough to allow them to move by themselves, specifically "to be employed in towing HM ships in the Thames and Medway". The ship was designed by Oliver Lang, the master shipwright at Woolwich Dockyard. She was fitted with a two-mast schooner rig, as well as a twin cylinder side-lever engine, which produced 80 nominal horsepower.

Humphry Davy travelled to Norway on the Comet in the summer of 1824 to test his zinc protectors for ships' copper bottoms.

On 10 December 1868 Comet was ordered to be broken up in Portsmouth Dockyard.
