= Bellisarius (1795 ship) =

History

Great Britain
- Name: Bellisarius
- Launched: 1783, Sweden
- Acquired: 1795
- Fate: Foundered 17 March 1796

General characteristics
- Tons burthen: 396 (bm)

Bellisarius was launched in Sweden in 1783, possibly under another name. She first appeared in Lloyd's Register (LR) in 1795. She was lost on 17 March 1796 in a tragic collision with a large Royal Navy warship.

Year	Master	Owner	Trade	Source
1795	T.Barge	Mount & Co.	London–Gibraltar	LR

From Gibraltar, Bellisarius sailed to Barbados, and then back to England. She also sailed to and from Jamaica.

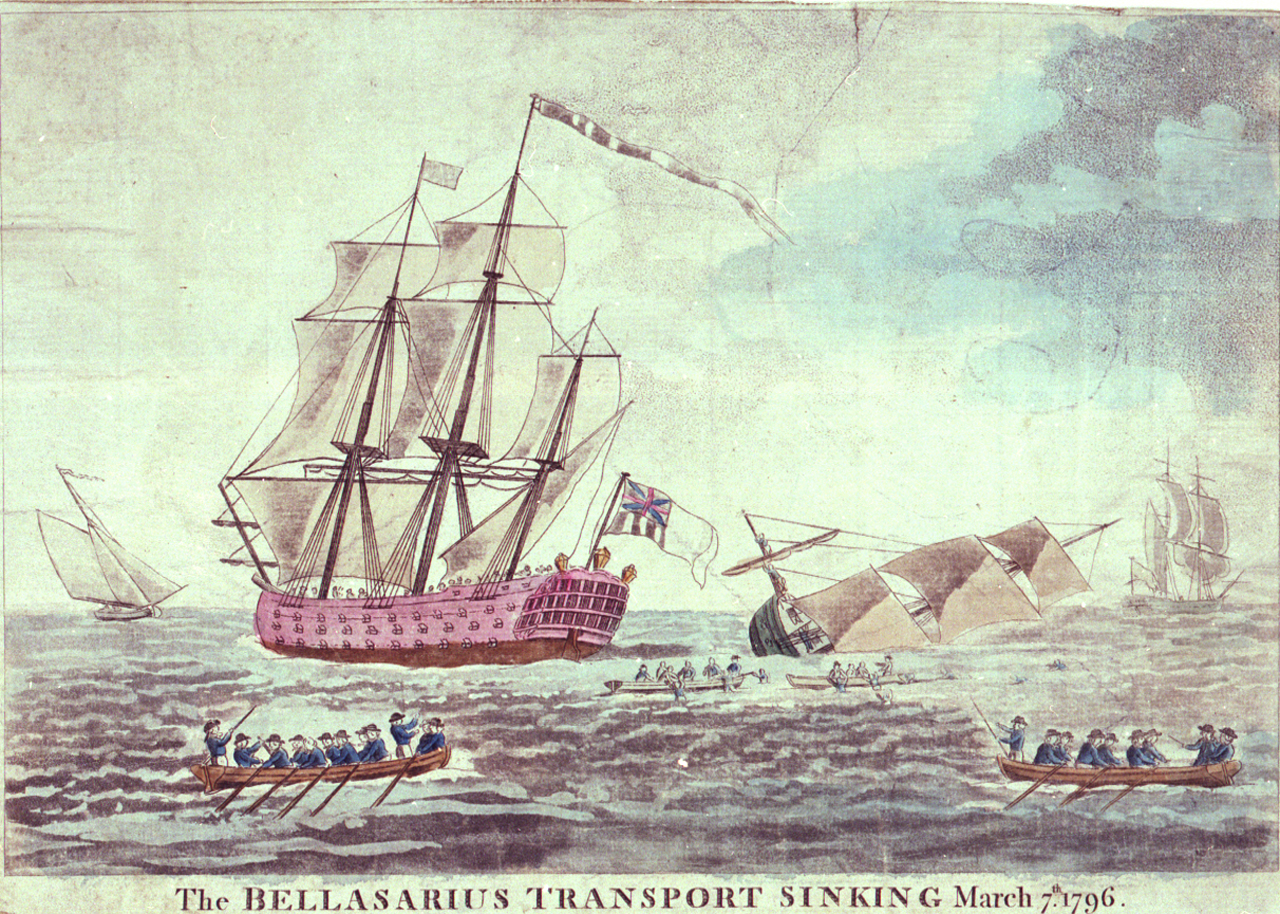
Royal Sovereign was involved with a tragic collision with the transport Bellisarius which promptly sank on 17 March 1796

On 17 March 1796 Bellisarius collided with HMS Royal Sovereign, one of the largest vessels in the Royal Navy, and sank. Belisarius was carrying troops and their dependents to the West Indies. Captain Barge and about 110 persons were saved.

A witness on Mars wrote in a letter to The Observer newspaper that the accident was "occasioned by a dispute between the Master and the second Mate [of the Bellisarius] when wearing ship; by which, not paying proper attention, they fell athwart the Royal Sovereign, when the Sovereign's gib-boom and bowsprit took their main-mast, and struck her amid ship, by which she almost instantly sunk. To add to the distress of this dreadful scene, an unhappy woman, with her infant in her arms, who stood on the quarter-deck of the Bellisarius, attempted to save the life of her infant by throwing it on board the Royal Sovereign at the instant of the two ships meeting, but unfortunately it fell between the two ships sides, and was crushed to atoms before the eyes of its unhappy mother, who, in her distraction of mind, instantly precipitated herself into the sea, and shared the grave of her child."

Royal Sovereign, which was carrying Vice-Admiral William Cornwallis, had left Portsmouth on 1 March with a squadron and a large convoy, bound for the West Indies. She had to return on 14 March to Spithead because of the damage she had sustained in the accident.
