= Thomas Pollard (shipwright) =

English shipwright (1745–1799)

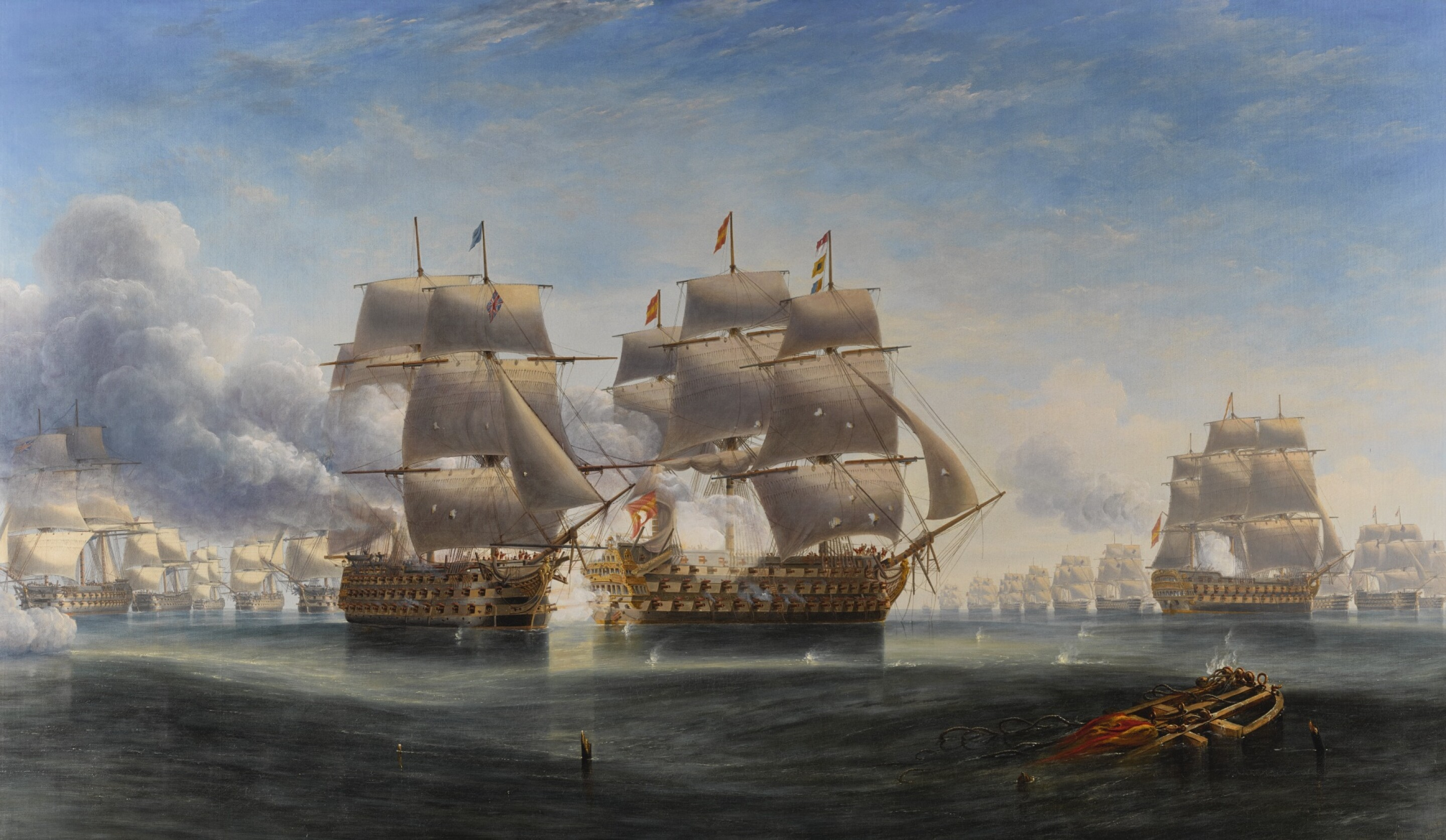
HMS Sovereign at Trafalgar

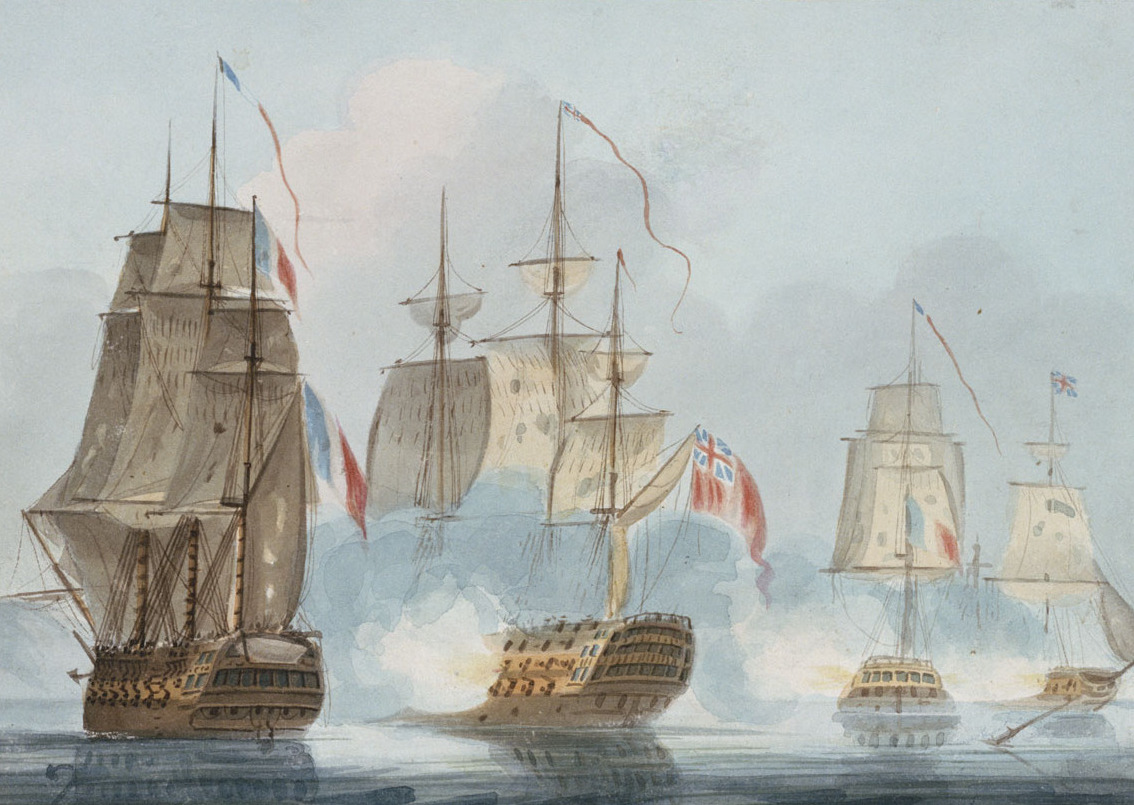
HMS Caesar engaging the French ship of the line Mont Blanc

Thomas Pollard (1731 – November 1799) was an English shipwright who worked at Deptford, Sheerness, Portsmouth, Woolwich, Plymouth and Chatham Royal Dockyards during the course of his career. He was responsible for HMS Royal Sovereign which played a vital role in the Battle of Trafalgar. Apprenticed as a Shipwright to John Rosewell of the notable Rosewell family at Deptford Dockyard in 1747 for a premium of £52. 10s 0d, his father was recorded as being Robert Pollard. Apprentices were usually 16 years old at this time (see National Archives ref(IR1 series)18f82 Britain county apprentices). It seems probable therefore that he was born during or before 1731.

== Life ==
Thomas was possibly the second son of Robert and Mary Pollard who was Christened at St Clements Hastings on 4 August 1731(vital. England births and christenings) Robert was possibly the shipwright who had contracted a lease from Hastings corporation for 15 years in 1727 (East Sussex record office HAS/E/A/B/14. and later in 1747 is recorded as a shipwright of Hastings, buying oak trees to the value of £207.(East Sussex Record office SAS/PN637 counterpart bill of sale February 1747) Thomas completed his apprenticeship with John Rosewell in Deptford around 1754. John Rosewell died the following year(Nat Burial Index Chatham 9th Nov. 1755). On 20 August 1757 Thomas married Sarah Hargood in Chatham (English Parish Marriages). The Hargood family were connected to the Rosewells by marriage. Thomas moved to Sheerness Dockyard by 1757 as here he took his first apprentices one in 1757 and another in 1763 (Britain county Apprentices 21f55 and 23f201) At this point in his career he was a Quarterman to the shipwrights and later a foreman. He subsequently achieved promotion and in July 1765 moved to Portsmouth as a "Master Boat Builder" a title usually requiring a minimum age of 20. He began work in Portsmouth. In 1775 he moved to Woolwich Dockyard. In 1778 he moved to Plymouth Docks and in 1779 returned to Portsmouth. Not until 1782 did he obtain the title Master Shipwright, and at this point took overall control of the projects. His first role at this level was at Sheerness building HMS Mermaid. On completion of this project in 1784 he was moved to have overall control of the far larger Plymouth Dockyard and thereafter plied between Plymouth and the naval dockyard at Chatham Docks as the government required. From 1795 he was also required to oversee Deptford Dockyard.

He died at Deptford Dockyard in November 1799.

== Main ships built ==
- HMS Mermaid (1784) of 32 guns (Sheerness)
- HMS Medusa (1785) of 50 guns (Plymouth) - Pollard in November 1784 replaced John Henslow, who began this ship in March 1776
- HMS Royal Sovereign (1786) of 100 guns (Plymouth) - Pollard in November 1784 replaced John Henslow, who was responsible for this ship from February 1775
- HMS Serpent (1789) of 16 guns (Plymouth)
- HMS Chatham, dockyard yacht (1793) (Chatham)
- HMS Caesar (1793) of 80 guns (Plymouth)- until April 1793, when replaced by Edward Sison, who completed the work
- HMS Stag (1794) of 32 guns (Chatham) - Pollard replaced John Nelson, who began this ship in March 1792 but died in March 1793
- HMS Unicorn (1794) of 32 guns (Chatham) - Pollard replaced John Nelson, who began this ship in March 1792 but died in March 1793
- HMS Maidstone (1795) of 32 guns (Deptford)- Pollard in June 1796 replaced Martin Ware, who began this ship in March 1795
- HMS Shannon (1796) of 32 guns (Deptford) - Pollard in June 1796 replaced Martin Ware, who began this ship in April 1795
- HMS Stork (1796) of 16 guns (Deptford)
- HMS Diomede (1798) of 50 guns (Deptford) - Pollard in June 1796 replaced Martin Ware, who began this ship in October 1792
- HMS Amethyst (1799) of 36 guns (Deptford)

Other works: refit of HMS Viper in 1786 at Plymouth

== Surviving works ==
A plan for a 41 foot punt/barge, signed "Thomas Pollard", capable of carrying a 30 ton load is held at the National Maritime Museum in Greenwich.
