= Navy Office (Royal Navy) =

British government office, 1576–1832

Navy Office (1576-1832)
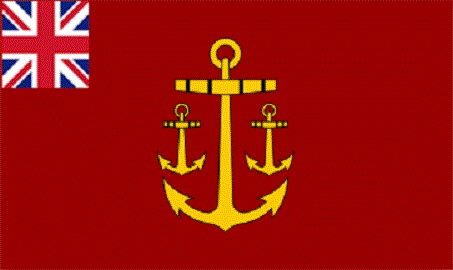
- Flag of the Navy Office in 1832

Government office overview
- Formed: 1576
- Preceding Government office: Office of the Council of the Marine
- Dissolved: 1832
- Jurisdiction: Kingdom of England; Kingdom of Great Britain
- Headquarters: Deptford (1576-1600); Tower Hill, City of London (1600-1654); Seething Lane, City of London (1654-1788); Somerset House (1789-1832); Whitehall, City of Westminster, London
- Government office executive: Comptroller of the Navy (1576-1660) Clerk of the Acts (1660-1796) Committees for Accounts, Correspondence, Stores, Transports and Victualling (1796-1832)
- Parent department: Department of Admiralty

The Navy Office was the government office responsible for the civil administration of the English, then British Royal Navy from 1576 to 1832. It contained all the members of the Navy Board and various other departments and offices. The day-to-day business of the Navy Office was headed by the Clerk of the Acts from 1660 until 1796. When this position was abolished duties were assumed by separate committees for Accounts, Correspondence, Stores, Transports and Victualling presided over by the Comptroller of the Navy. The Navy Office was one of two government offices (the other being the Department of Admiralty) that were jointly responsible for directing naval affairs. In 1832 following reforms of the naval service the Navy Office was abolished and its functions and staff taken over by the Admiralty.

== History ==
In 1576 the Navy Office replaced the Office of the Council of the Marine.

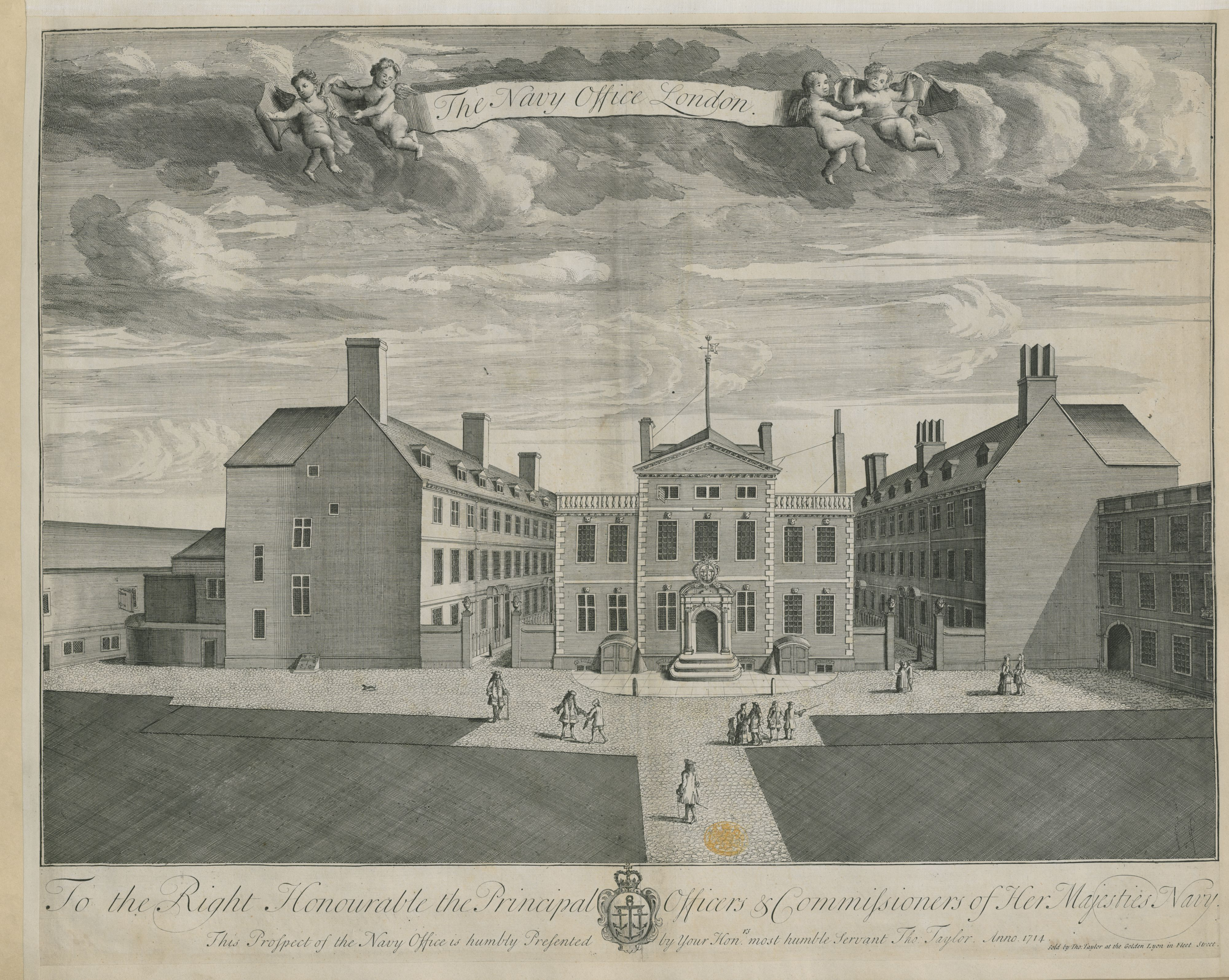
The Navy Office, Crutched Friars, 1714

Based at Deptford for most of the sixteenth century, the Navy Office later moved to the Tower Hill area of London. In 1655 it relocated to a site at the crossroad of Crutched Friars and Seething Lane but in 1673 the office building was destroyed by fire. A new building designed by Christopher Wren was opened on the site in 1684. The Navy Office continued to be based in Tower Hill until its move in 1786 to Somerset House.

Until 1628 the Navy Office was an independent advisory office to the Admiralty and Marine Affairs Office but upon the creation of the Board of Admiralty it became a subsidiary yet autonomous component of that office. The primary organisation within the office was the Navy Board and the various offices of its principal commissioners. However, the Treasurer of the Navy although a principal member of the board administered a separate Navy Pay Office. From 1567 until 1660 the office was administered by the Comptroller of the Navy. In 1660 the Clerk of the Acts became responsible for the organisation of the Navy Office. In 1796 administration of the Navy Office was placed under the supervision of three Committees, of Correspondence, Accounts and Stores. Throughout its history its clerical supporting staff consisting of chief clerks then first, second and third class clerks were assigned to the various offices and departments within the Navy Office. In 1808 the Naval Works Department was relocated from the Admiralty to the Navy Office. A Ticket and Wages Branch was formed in 1829. In 1832 the Navy Office and subsequently the Navy Board were abolished and its functions transferred to the Department of Admiralty under supervision of the Board of Admiralty.

== Organisation and structure of the Navy Office ==
The Navy Office provided accommodation for the Commissioners of the Navy Board and senior clerical and secretarial staff, as well as office space. Different branches, departments and offices were located within different parts of the Navy Office in London, England. Royal Navy Dockyards both in the United Kingdom and overseas were also part of this office.

=== Components of the Navy Office ===
The Navy Office consisted of a number of specific component parts that included:

==== Boards ====
The Navy Board and formerly known as the Council of the Marine or Council of the Marine Causes was the organisation with responsibility for the day-to-day civil administration of the Royal Navy between 1546 and 1832. Its principal officers and commissioners were headquartered in the Navy Office.

1. Navy Board

==== Branches and Offices ====
1. Allotment Office (1795-1822)
2. Bill Office
3. Contract Office (1803-1832) later became the Contract and Purchase Department
4. Draftsmen Office
5. Fee Office (controlled by the Receiver of Fees and Paymaster of Contingencies)
6. Office for Current Business (1686-1688)
7. Office for Examining Accounts Incurred (1686-1689)
8. Office for Examining Storekeepers’ Accounts (1671-1796)
9. Office for Examining Treasurers Accounts (1667-1796)
10. Office for Examining Victualling Accounts (1667-1796)
11. Office for Foreign Accounts (1807-1829)
12. Office for Old Accounts (1686-1688)
13. Office of Bills and Accounts (1686-1832)
14. Office of the Clerk Comptroller of the Navy (1546-1561)
15. Office of the Comptroller of the Navy of the Navy (1561-1832)
16. Office for Seamen's Wages (1688-1829)
17. Office of the Assistant Comptroller of the Navy (1682-1691)
18. Office of Assistant Clerk of the Acts and Secretary to the Navy Board (1680-1832)
19. Office of the Clerk of the Acts
20. Office of the Deputy Comptroller of the Navy (1793-1816, 1829–1832)
21. Office of the Committee for Accounts
22. Office of the Committee for Correspondence
23. Office of the Committee for Stores
24. Office of the Committee for Transports
25. Office of the Committee for Victualling
26. Office of the Counsel to the Navy Board (1673-1696)
27. Office of the Counsel for the Affairs of the Admiralty and Navy (1696-1832)
28. Office of the General-Surveyor of Victuals
29. Office of the Messenger to the Navy Board (1660-1832)
30. Paymaster of the Marines (1831-1832)
31. Office of the Paymaster of Widows Pensions (1732-1834)
32. Office of the Private Secretary to Controller (1794-1832)
33. Office of the Superintendent of Transports (1829-1831)
34. Slop Office
35. Office of the Solicitor for the Affairs of the Admiralty and Navy (1692-1698)
36. Office of the Solicitor to the Admiralty and Navy (1703-1828)
37. Stores Office (1796-1832)
38. Surveyors Office
39. Transport Branch (1817-1832)
40. Ticket Office (1660-1829)
41. Ticket and Wages Branch (1829-1832)

==== Departments ====
1. Accounts Department
2. Department of the Accountant-General of the Navy (1829-1832)
3. Department of the Storekeeper-General of the Navy (1829-1832)
4. Department of the Surveyor of Buildings (1807-1832)
5. Naval Works Department (1807-1813)
6. Payments Department

==== Dockyards ====
Oversight of all Royal Navy Dockyards that were part of the Navy Office were normally supervised by a resident commissioner of the navy board at their respective yards, these commissioners did not normally attend Navy Board meetings in London; nevertheless, they were full members of the Navy Board. After the abolition of the Navy Board and subsequently the Navy Office in 1832 responsibility for the management of the dockyards passed to the Board of Admiralty.

===== United Kingdom and Ireland dockyards =====
1. Portsmouth Dockyard (1496-)
2. Woolwich Dockyard(1512-1832)
3. Deptford Dockyard (1513-1869)
4. Chatham Dockyard (1567-1983)
5. Harwich Dockyard (1652-1829)
6. Sheerness Dockyard (1665-1960)
7. Plymouth Dockyard renamed Devonport Dockyard in 1823 (1689-)
8. Pembroke Dockyard (1815-1947)

Other minor yards (with some permanent staff and minor repair/storage facilities, but without dry docks etc.) were established in a number of locations over time, usually to serve a nearby anchorage used by naval vessels.

1. Deal Dockyard (1672- )
2. Falmouth Dockyard
3. Great Yarmouth Dockyard
4. Kinsale Dockyard and supply base, Cork, Ireland (1647-1812)
5. Leith Dockyard
6. Milford Haven Dockyard (1797-1814) shipbuilding and repairs transferred to Pembroke Dockyard

===== Overseas dockyards =====
1. Jamaica Dockyard, Port Royal, Jamaica (1675-1729, 1749–1905)
2. Cádiz Dockyard (1694)
3. Gibraltar Dockyard (1704-1984)
4. Port Mahon Dockyard, Menorca, Spain (1708-1812)
5. Antigua Naval Dockyard (1728-1882)
6. Port Antonio Dockyard, Jamaica (1729-1749)
7. Royal Naval Dockyard, Halifax, Canada (1759-1905)
8. Navy Island Royal Naval Shipyard, Canada (1763-1822)
9. Barbados Dockyard (1779-1783, 1810)
10. Kingston Royal Naval Dockyard, Canada (1788-1853)
11. Malta Dockyard (1791-1979)
12. Simons Town Dockyard, Simon's Town, South Africa (1790-1898)
13. York Naval Shipyard, Canada (1793-1813)
14. Ajaccio Dockyard, Ajaccio, Corsica (1794-1799)
15. Bermuda Dockyard, Bermuda (1795-1951)
16. Amherstburg Royal Naval Dockyard, Canada (1796-1813)
17. Madras Dockyard, India (1796-1813) (staff and work transferred to Trincomalee)
18. Cape of Good Hope Dockyard (1808-1822)
19. Bombay Dockyard, India (1813-1947)
20. Trincomalee Dockyard, Ceylon (1813-1957)
21. Penetanguishene Naval Yard, Canada (1813-1856)
22. Ascension Dockyard on Ascension Island (1816-1922)

==== Services ====
1. Transport Service (1817-1832) the service was provided as part of the Transport Board.

=== Autonomous components of the Navy Office ===
1. Navy Pay Office (1546-1832)
2. Sick and Hurt Office (1653-1806)
3. Transport Office (1686-1817)
4. Victualling Office (1653-1832)

== Sources ==
1. Admiralty Office (1814) The Navy List. Navy Office. John Murray. London. England.
2. https://www.british-history.ac.uk/office-holders/vol7
3. Collinge, J. M. (1978). "Index of offices: British History Online". www.british-history.ac.uk. Institute of Historical Research, University of London.
4. "Index of offices," in Office-Holders in Modern Britain: Volume 7, Navy Board Officials 1660–1832, ed. J M Collinge (London: University of London, 1978), 153. British History Online, accessed January 2, 2019, http://www.british-history.ac.uk/office-holders/vol7/p153.
5. Rodger, N. A. M. (2004). "Administration 1509 to 1574". The safeguard of the sea: a naval history of Britain. Vol 1., 660–1649. London, England: Penguin. ISBN 9780140297249.
