= St Peter's Dyrham =

Grade I listed parish church in South Gloucestershire, England

Coordinates: 51°28′50.16″N 2°22′25.356″W

St Peter's Church, Dyrham
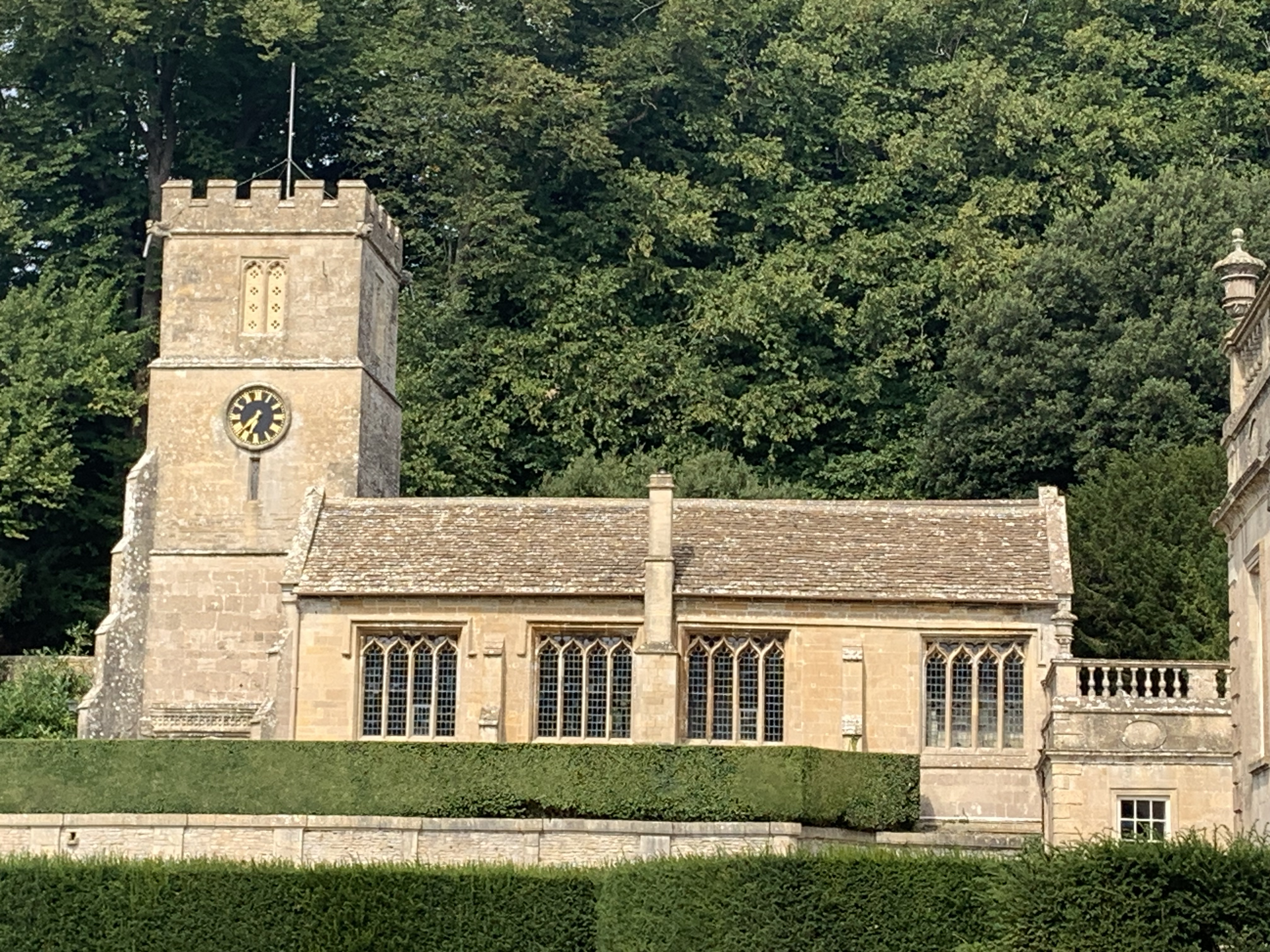
- St Peters Church, Dyrham
- St Peter's Church, Dyrham
- Location: Dyrham, South Gloucestershire, England
- Country: England
- Denomination: Church of England
- Website: www.achurchnearyou.com/church/11796/

History
- Status: Parish church

Architecture
- Functional status: Active

Administration
- Province: Province of Canterbury
- Diocese: Diocese of Bristol
- Archdeaconry: Malmesbury
- Deanery: Kingswood and South Gloucestershire
- Parish: Doynton & Dyrham

St Peter's Church, Dyrham is the Anglican parish church of Dyrham, South Gloucestershire, England. Dating from the mid-13th century, the church is listed Grade I for its exceptional architectural and historic interest. The church stands immediately beside Dyrham Park, with which it has long-standing historical connections and to which it is linked by a private doorway from the south aisle. Notable among its burials is the elaborate tomb of George Wynter, Clerk of the Ships and one of the investors in Sir Francis Drake's 1577 circumnavigation of the globe.

== History and architecture ==
The oldest fabric of the church dates from the mid-13th century, likely around 1280. The three-stage west tower and the south porch are early 15th century, and the church was altered and enlarged about 1470. The south aisle was restored after 1688 for the statesman William Blathwayt when the neighbouring mansion at Dyrham Park was rebuilt; the interior was redecorated in 1964 by E. F. Tew.

Built of limestone rubble with freestone dressings and Cotswold stone-slate roofs, the plan comprises west tower, south-west porch, nave and chancel with north and south aisles. The Perpendicular tower has diagonal buttresses, a parapet with gargoyles, and a west door beneath a three-light window; the second stage has lancets and a clock on the south face, and the belfry has paired two-light openings with trefoil heads.

== Fittings and monuments ==
Notable fittings include a late Norman font in the nave, a second 17th-century font in the south aisle, a Jacobean wooden pulpit with sounding-board, a 16th-century Flemish altar triptych, medieval encaustic floor tiles, and nine heraldic hatchments (early 18th century to 1872) associated with the Blathwayt family.

Among the monuments are large brasses to Sir Maurice Russell (d. 1416) and his wife Isabel in the south aisle; the canopied tomb with recumbent effigies of George Wynter (d. 1581) and his wife Anne; a hanging marble monument to Mary Blathwayt and her parents by John Harvey (contract dated 1710); and later tablets including that to William Blathwayt (1839) by Peter Rouw’s pupil Edward Hodges Baily’s associate William Sievier. A private doorway at the east end of the south aisle gives access towards Dyrham House.

== Parish ==
St Peter’s serves the parish of Doynton & Dyrham within the benefice of Wick with Doynton and Dyrham, in the Deanery of Kingswood and South Gloucestershire, the Archdeaconry of Malmesbury, and the Diocese of Bristol.

== Churchyard and Dyrham Park ==
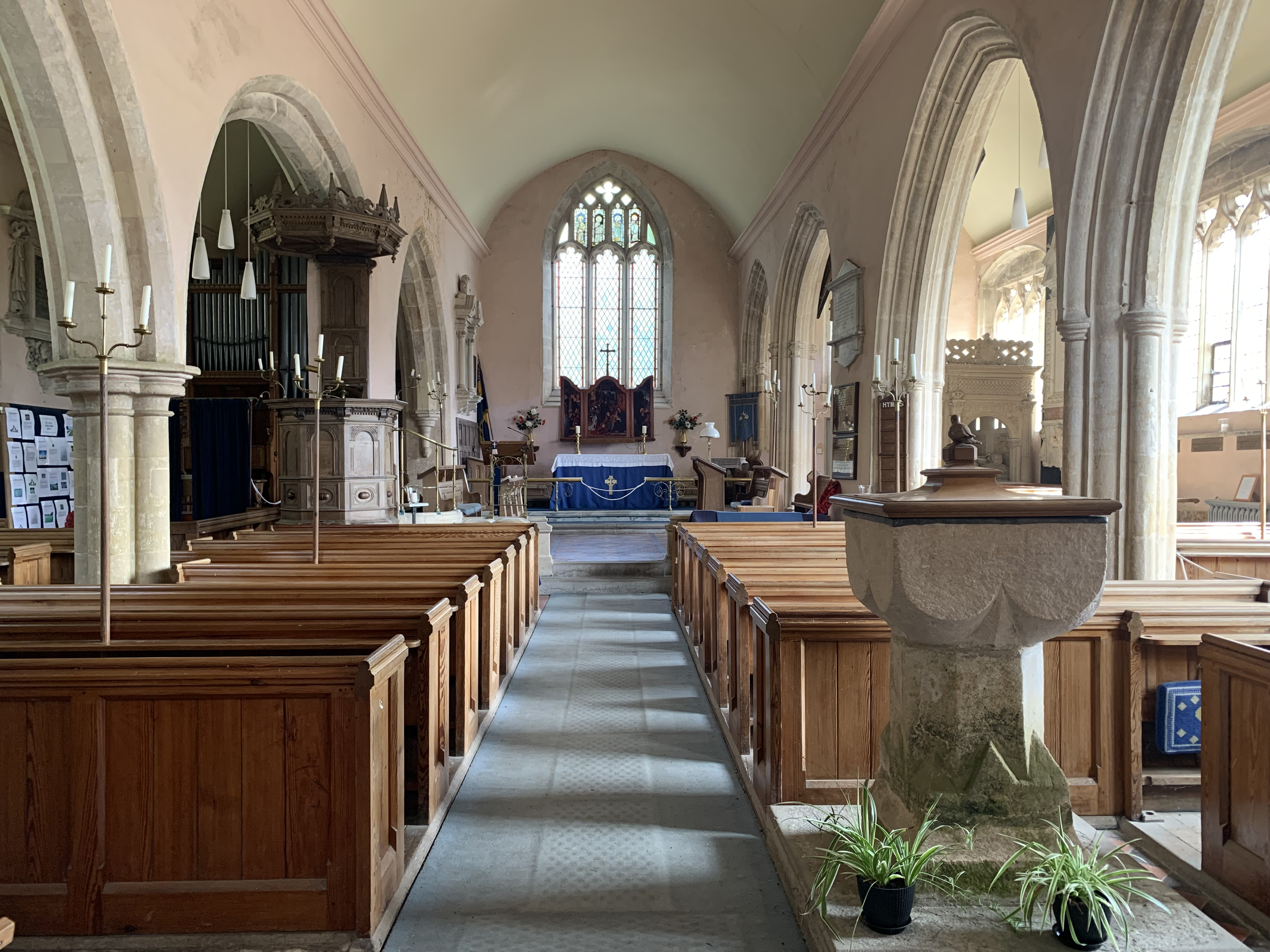
St Peter's Dyrham Interior

The church stands immediately beside Dyrham Park, a baroque country house and estate now in the care of the National Trust.The churchyard contains several listed monuments, including the late-18th-century Toghill chest tomb about 5 m west of the north aisle (Grade II). A parish war memorial stands within the grounds, with additional commemorations inside the church.

== Gallery ==
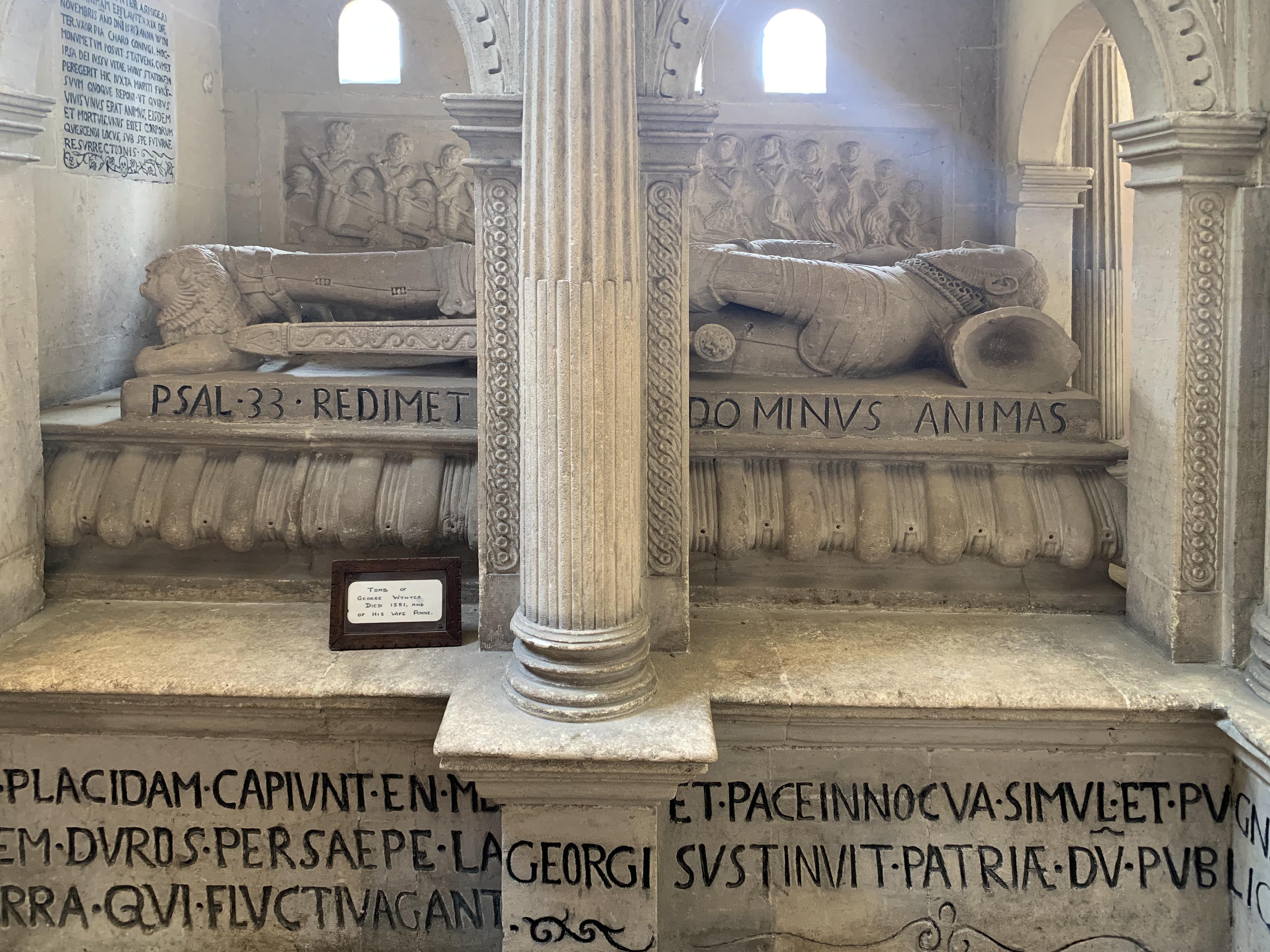

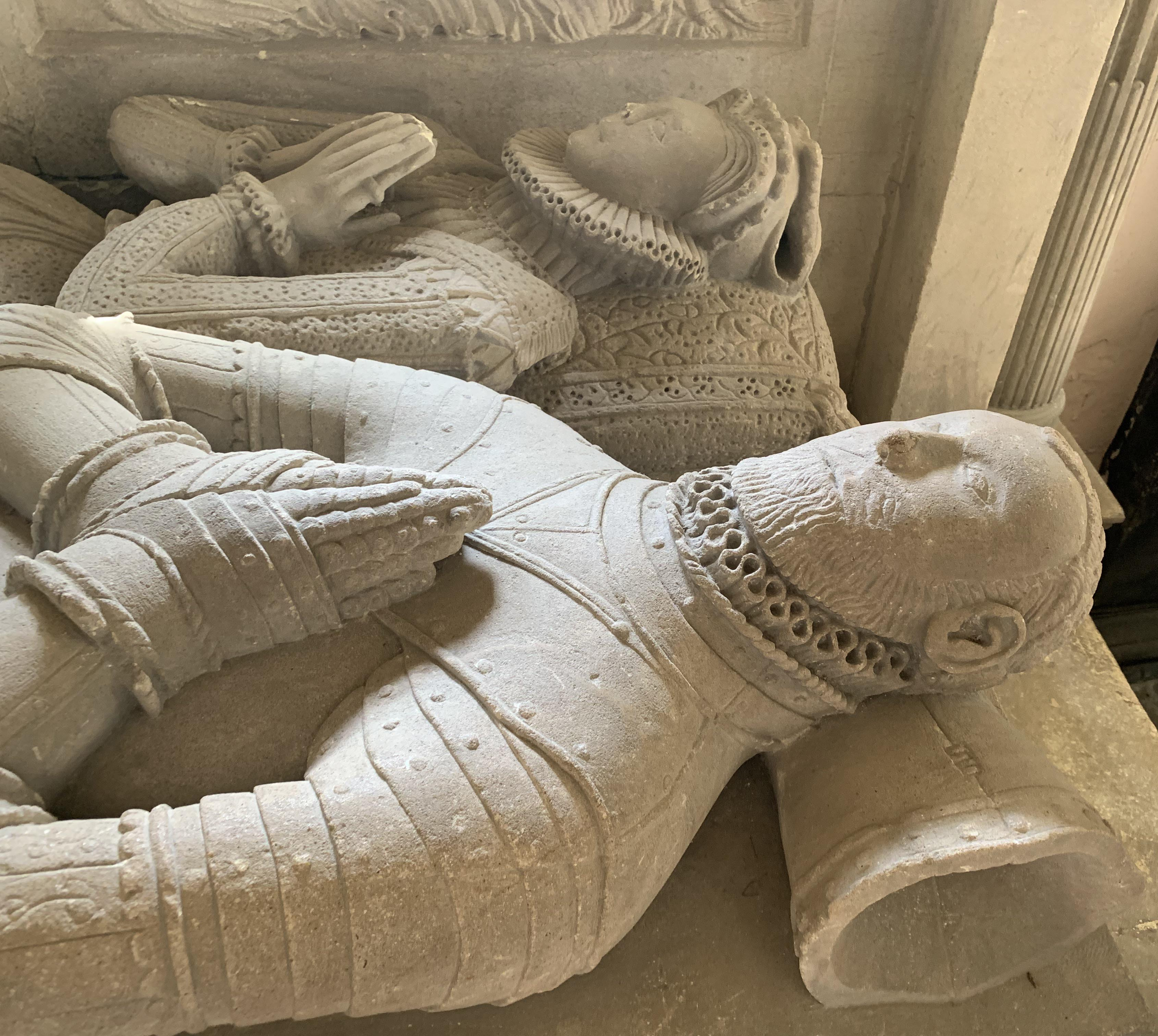

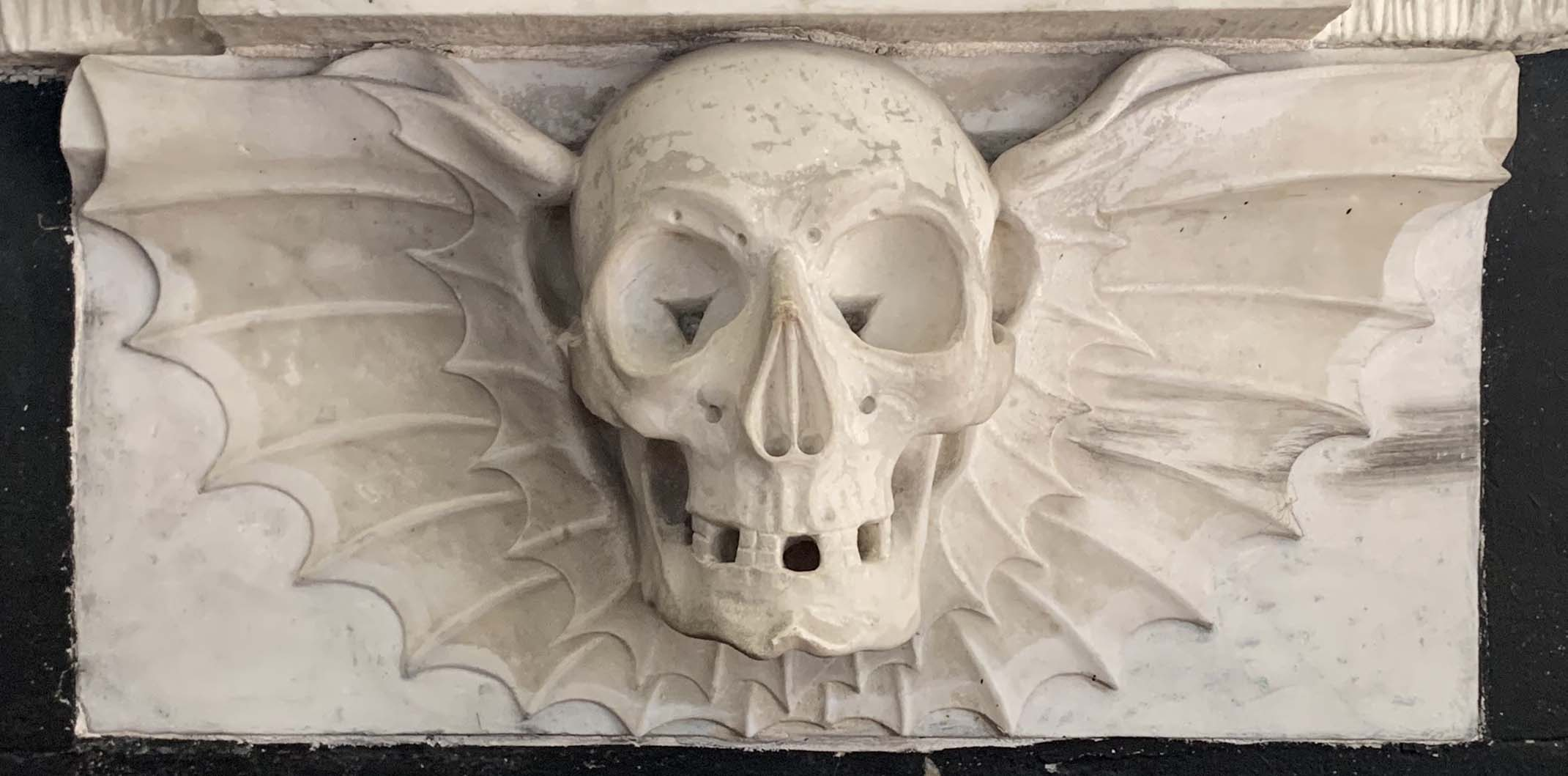

== See also ==
- George Wynter
- Grade I listed buildings in Gloucestershire
- List of churches in Gloucestershire
