= Ticket Office (Navy Office) =

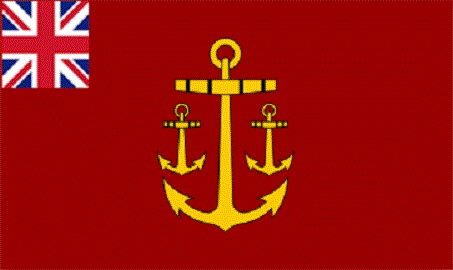

Office overview
- Formed: 1660
- Preceding Office: None
- Dissolved: 1829
- Superseding Office: Ticket and Wages Branch
- Jurisdiction: Government of the United Kingdom
- Headquarters: Admiralty London
- Office executive: Manager of Ticket Office (1673-1674), Chief Clerk, Ticket Office (1674-1829)
- Parent department: Navy Office

The Ticket Office was established in 1660 as part of the Navy Office. It administered the payment of naval wages in conjunction with the Navy Pay Office until 1829, when it was merged with the Office for Seamen's Wages where it became the Ticket and Wages Branch.

The office was administered by the Manager of Ticket Office, later by the Chief Clerk, Ticket Office.

== History ==
The Ticket Office was established in 1660 and was part of the Comptroller of the Navy's department until 1668. It then became part of the office of Controller of Treasurer Accounts until 1672 when it became part of the Office of Extra Commissioners of the Navy. In 1673 the distinct office of Manager of the Ticket Office was established until 1674. In 1682 it was transferred back under the Comptrollers department until 1691. In 1691 it again became part of the Controller of Treasurer Accounts department. In 1829 the office was amalgamated with the Office for Seamen's Wages and was renamed the Ticket and Wages Branch.

== Head of office ==
=== Manager Ticket Office ===
Included:

1. 1673-1674, T. Lewis

=== Chief Clerk Ticket Office ===
Included:

1. 1674-1682, W Whitfield
2. 1682 Jan-Nov, T.
3. 1682-1686, M. Hale
4. 1686-1689, D. Lyddell
5. 1689-1692, W. Whitfield
6. 1692-1727, M. Howen
7. 1727-1732, W. Burton
8. 1732-1739, J. Phillipson
9. 1739-1750, J. Rossington
10. 1750-1774, E. Bentham
11. 1774-1789, W. Paynter
12. 1789-1808, J. Hunter
13. 1808-1821, G. Daysh
14. 1821-1826, S. Inman
15. 1826-1829, J. Lance

== Sources ==
1. 'Chief Clerks and Clerks: Chief Clerks', in Office-Holders in Modern Britain: Volume 7, Navy Board Officials 1660-1832, ed. J M Collinge (London, 1978), pp. 34–45. British History Online https://www.british-history.ac.uk/office-holders/vol7/pp34-45 [accessed 6 January 2019].
2. 'Manager of Ticket Office 1673-4', in Office-Holders in Modern Britain: Volume 7, Navy Board Officials 1660-1832, ed. J M Collinge (London, 1978), p. 26. British History Online http://www.british-history.ac.uk/office-holders/vol7/p26 [accessed 6 January 2019].
