= Marine Department =

Marine Department is a term for a variety of departments, in marine science, military and maritime transport and authorities:

== Government bodies and authorities ==
- Department of Marine and Fisheries and the Naval Service, Canada
- Department of Marine and Fisheries, Canada
- Department of Agriculture, Food and the Marine, Ireland
- Marine Department (Hong Kong) - manages the Hong Kong harbour
- Marine Department (Malaysia), a federal agency in Malaysia
- Marine Department (New Zealand)
- Marine Fisheries Department, Pakistan
- Singapore Marine Department, now merged into the Maritime and Port Authority of Singapore

== Military organisations ==
- Marine Department (Royal Navy), British Admiralty
- State Department Marines, USA
