= William Brouncker (Wiltshire MP, died 1596) =

Member of the Parliament of England

Sir William Brouncker (c. 1547 – 1596) was an English landowner with estates in Wiltshire, and a Member of Parliament for Westbury.

He was the eldest son of Henry Brouncker of Melksham and Erlestoke by his second wife Ursula Yate. He was trained in the law, entering the Middle Temple in 1566. He succeeded his father in 1568, becoming a wealthy landowner with estates near Chippenham and Devizes, and property in Westbury. He married Martha, the daughter of Sir Walter Mildmay, the following year

As a substantial local landowner, he secured his own election and that of his younger brother Henry as MP for Westbury in 1572. He represented Westbury again in 1584. He was a member of the Wiltshire bench as a justice of the peace from 1573 and was appointed High Sheriff of Wiltshire for 1581–82. His status in the county was sufficient for him to be elected as a knight of the shire for Wiltshire in 1586, 1589 and 1593. He was knighted in 1592. As an MP he was active as a committee-man and is recorded as having spoken three times in his last parliament.

He died in 1596. Martha died in 1614.

== Children ==
He and Martha had a son and four daughters:

- Henry, married Gertrude, daughter of Henry Sadler of Everleigh, Wiltshire
- Mary, married John Wynter of Dyrham, Gloucestershire
- Grace, married Sir Francis Wortley, 1st Baronet
- Anne, married Sir John Jennings
- Elizabeth, married Hugh Halswell
