= Alfred Chalmers =

British mariner (1845–1937)

Sir Alfred Chalmers
- Born: 5 November 1845; Bishopwearmouth, Tyne and Wear, U.K.
- Died: 24 June 1937 (aged 91); Hammersmith, London, U.K.
- Occupation: Mariner
- Years active: 1860 – 1911
- Employers: Merchant Navy; Board of Trade

Sir Alfred John George Chambers (5 November 1845 – 24 June 1937), more commonly known as Captain A. J. G. Chalmers prior to his knighthood, was a British master mariner and a professional adviser to the Marine Department of the Board of Trade.

== Biography ==
=== Early life ===
Chalmers was born on the 5 November 1845 in Bishop Wearmouth, Durham, the son of James M. and Jane Chalmers, with his father being a classical and commercial trader.

=== In the merchant navy (1860 – 1877) ===
He was apprenticed to the merchant navy on 29 June 1860 on one of the famous ships then trading between Blackwall and the East Indies and Australia. In 1863, he became third officer of one of these vessels and in the following year he was shipwrecked on the north-west coast of Australia. After this adventure he became second mate and, later, first mate, of a vessel engaged in surveying the west coast of Australia.

In 1866 Chalmers went into steam, and was employed in a vessel engaged in the carrying of emigrants between Copenhagen and New York City. In that year he was shipwrecked for the second time, when his vessel came to grief in the Gulf of Bothnia. For a time he served with the Diamond Line of Steamers, when was then maintained between London and South Africa. Reverting to sail, he became chief mate of a large iron clipper of the Kolkata trade. On his return to steamships he served, first as chief officer, and then as master of steam ships in the coasting and home trades, an in the Baltic, Mediterranean, Atlantic, and Easter services.

=== Marine Department of the Board of Trade (1877 – 1911) ===
With a varied experience of the sea behind him, Captain Chalmers joined the Marine Department of the Board of Trade in 1877, and was stationed, in turn, at various ports throughout the country. From being principal district officer for South Wales at Cardiff, he was transferred in 1896 to Whitehall. Captain Chalmers served on 15 Board of Trade's departmental committees, including those appointed in connexion with tonnage laws and workmen's compensation. He was the chief British delegate at the conferences held in many countries to secure uniformity in the equipment of ships regard safety of life at sea and other matters, and in 1910 he was one of five British delegates to the International Conference on Aerial Navigation held in Paris. He retired from the Board of Trade in August 1911, it being delayed from 1910 due to his participation in international negotiations, and following his retirement he gave evidence to the inquiry of the sinking of the Titanic on the provision of lifeboats.

== Personal life ==
Chalmers married Mary Henrietta Johnson (c.1850-1927), daughter of Frederick. H. Johnson, surgeon, on 3 September 1874 in Lambeth, and they were the parents of Alfred Arthur Albert Chalmers and Evelyn Maud Mary Chalmers. He was knighted in the New Year's Honours, on 1 January 1911. He died at Latymer Court, Hammersmith on 24 June 1937.
