= Marine Pay Department (Royal Navy) =

UK Royal Marine Office department (1755–1831)

Accounting Department overview
- Formed: 1755
- Preceding Accounting Department: Marine Pay Office
- Dissolved: 1831
- Jurisdiction: United Kingdom
- Headquarters: New Street, Spring Gardens, City of Westminster, London
- Accounting Department executive: Paymaster of the Marines (1755–1803), Paymaster and Inspector General of Marines (1803–1831)
- Parent department: Royal Marine Office

The Marine Pay Department was formed in 1755, and replaced the earlier Marine Pay Office that was established in 1702. It was responsible for processing marines' pay to the Royal Marine Divisions located at Chatham, Portsmouth, Plymouth and Woolwich. The department was initially administered by the Paymaster of the Marines whose title later changed to the Paymaster and Inspector General of Marines. In 1809 it absorbed the secretariat duties of the Marine Department. The department existed until 1831 as part of the Royal Marine Office when it was abolished and its duties transferred to the Navy Pay Office.

== History ==
The Marine Pay Department was created in 1755. It succeeded the earlier Marine Pay Office that was established in 1702. The department was responsible for processing marines' pay to the Royal Marines Division's at Chatham, Portsmouth and Plymouth. The department was initially administered by the Paymaster of the Marines, whose title later changed to the Paymaster and Inspector General of Marines. In 1809 it absorbed the secretariat duties of the Marine Department. The department existed as a separate organisation from the military command of the Royal Marine Forces that were under direct control of the Board of Admiralty until 1825 when the Deputy Adjutant General was appointed to administer the Royal Marines and his office became known Royal Marine Office. This department existed until 1831 as department of the Royal Marine Office of the Department of Admiralty when it was abolished and its duties transferred to the Navy Pay Office of the Treasurer of the Navy. Following the abolition of the Marine Pay Department, a second class clerk in this Department William Robinson transferred to the Navy Board and promoted to Paymaster of the Marines to the Navy Board.

== Location ==
The department was based at:

Based at	Date/s	Ref.
Upper Grosvenor Street, Mayfair, London	1797 to 1805	
Buckingham Street, Strand, London	1820 to 1827	
New Street, Spring Gardens, London	1827 to 1831	

== Head of department ==
=== Paymaster of the Marines ===
Included:

1. 1755–1756, William Adair
2. 1756–1757, George Campbell
3. 1757–1778, John Tucker
4. 1778–1792, Gabriel Steward
5. 1792–1803, The Hon. George Villiers

=== Paymaster and Inspector General of Marines ===
Included:

1. 1803–1810, The Hon. George Villiers
2. 1810–1812, The Hon. Edmund Phipps
3. 1812–1813, The Hon. Edward Richard Stewart
4. 1813–1815, Francis Hastings Doyle
5. 1815–1818, The Hon. Granville Anson Chetwynd Stapylton
6. 1819–1831, Sir James Cockburn

== Structure and offices under the Paymaster and Inspector General of Marines ==
Following the creation of the pay department the Paymaster of Marines was supported by a clerical staff consisting of the First Clerk Marine Pay Department later Chief Clerk of the Marine Pay Department who in turn was assisted by a Second Class Clerk who in turn was assisted by a Third Class Clerk. To this structure was added additional extra clerical staff. There also existed a Messengers Office and also an Office Keeper or in modern terms an Office Manager. Another group within this organisation were the Agents of the Marine Office reporting to this department but these based at the various Royal Marine Divisions regional headquarters.

=== First Class/Chief Clerks Office ===
Included:

1. 1755–1795, J. Madden
2. 1795–1797, E. Waters
3. 1797–1807, D. C. Webb
4. 1807–1808, E. Waters
5. 1808–1831, Thomas Hind

==== Second Class Clerks Office ====
Included:

1. 1795–1797, D. C. Webb
2. 1797–1807, T. Waller
3. 1807–1819, G. Gardner
4. 1819–1827, William Robinson (promoted to Paymaster of the Marines (Navy Board) in 1829
5. 1827–1831, J. Edwards

===== Third Class Clerks Office =====
This office usually consisted of three clerks holding the position at the same time and included:

1. 1819–1824, W. Brixey
2. 1819–1824, J. Edwards
3. 1819–1824, W. Gardner
4. 1824–1827, C. Cooper
5. 1827–1830, W. Bartmore
6. 1827–1830, H. Cooper
7. 1827–1830, R. Edwards
8. 1830–1831, C. W. Hind

=== Extra Clerks Office ===
Included:

1. 1800–1801, W. Robinson
2. 1801–1803, W. Brixey
3. 1803–1807, J. Edwards
4. 1807–1819, W. Gardner

=== Messengers Office ===
Included:

1. 1800–1809, T. Hayward
2. 1809–1813, R. Leader
3. 1813–1826, R. Pitts
4. 1826–1831, R. Elbourn

=== Office Keeper ===
Included:

1. 1824–1827, R. Glendenning
2. 1827–1831, W. H. Weaver

=== Agents of Marines ===
The Agent of Marines were officers of the Marine Pay Office established in 1756, one assigned to each of the three divisions and included:

1. 1756–1760, M. Guerin, (Plymouth)
2. 1756–1760, J. Winter, (Portsmouth)
3. 1756–1760, J. Baird, (Chatham)
4. 1760–1763, J. Clevland, (Plymouth)
5. 1763–1767, J. Clevland, (Chatham, Plymouth and Portsmouth)
6. 1767–1791, G. Williams, (Chatham, Plymouth and Portsmouth)
7. 1791–1800, C. Cox, (Chatham, Plymouth and Portsmouth)

== Sources ==
1. Archives, National (1688–1983). "Records of Royal Marines". nationalarchives.gov.uk. London, England: The National Archives.
2. 'Marine pay department', in Office-Holders in Modern Britain: Volume 4, Admiralty Officials 1660–1870, ed. J C Sainty (London, 1975), pp. 85–90. British History Online http://www.british-history.ac.uk/office-holders/vol4/pp85-90 [accessed 3 January 2019].
3. Office, Admiralty (January 1820). The Navy List. London, England: John Murray.
4. Office, Admiralty (December 1827). The Navy List. London, England: John Murray
5. Parliament, Great Britain. (1797) The Royal Kalendar and Court and City Register for England, Scotland, Ireland and the Colonies. W. March. London. England.
6. Parliament, Great Britain. (1805) The Royal Kalendar and Court and City Register for England, Scotland, Ireland and the Colonies. W. March. London. England.
