= George Wynter =

English Naval Administrator (died 1581)

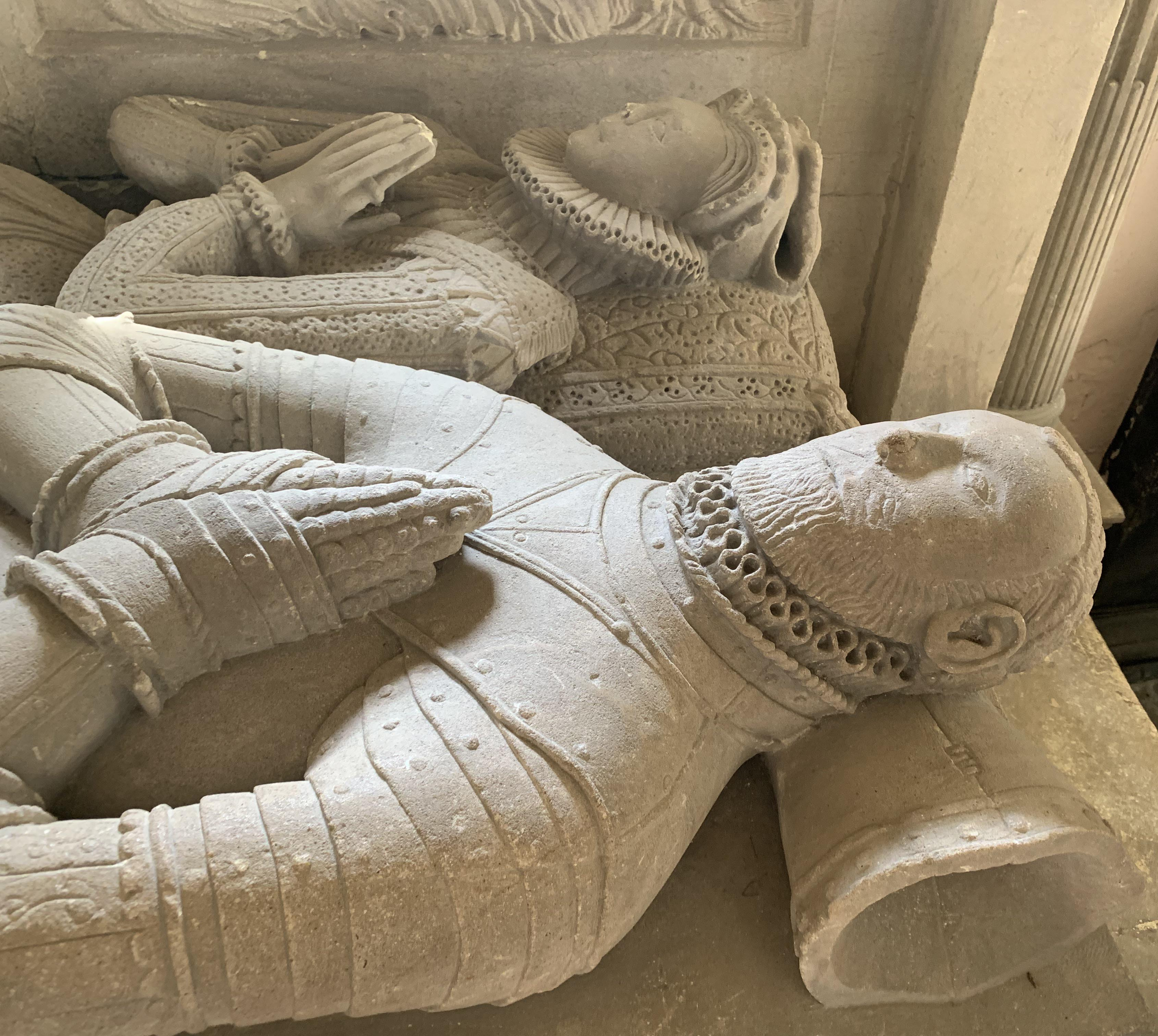
- Effigy of George Wynter

Clerk of The Ships
- Incumbent
- Assumed office 1560

Personal details
- Born: c. 1520 Gloucestershire, England
- Died: 29 November 1581 Gloucestershire, England
- Spouse: Anne Wynter
- Relations: Admiral Sir William Wynter (brother)
- Children: Thomasine Wynter, Robert Wynter, Benedict Wynter, Mary Huntley, William Wynter, Elizabeth Joyce, Bridget Wirrall, Margaret Weekes, Anne Price, Eleanor Wynter, Sir John Wynter
- Occupation: Naval administrator, adventurer, landowner

George Wynter (c1520-1581) was an English naval administrator, adventurer and landowner from Gloucestershire. George Wynter served in the Queen's navy, alongside his brother Admiral Sir William Wynter (1521 – 1589) who held the office of Surveyor and Rigger of the Navy for 40 years. George Wynter was appointed Clerk of the Ships to the Queen's navy in 1562, a position he held until his death in 1581. Wynter was an investor in the voyage of Sir Francis Drake to circumnavigate the globe in 1577, on which journey Drake was accompanied by Wynter's son John Wynter. George Wynter's elaborate stone effigy and tomb are located in the church of St Peter's Dyrham, adjacent to Wynter's home at Dyrham Park.

== Biography ==
=== Early life ===
George Wynter was born into the Wynter family of Gloucestershire, a prominent local lineage with significant estates and influence in the region during the Tudor period. George Wynter was born in around 1520, the son of Alice and John Wynter, the latter a Bristol merchant and naval commander who served Henry VIII as Paymaster of the King's Navy from 1544-45.

=== Naval Career ===
The Wynter family fortune was made through trade and piracy, sending ships to Africa in the 1560s. The brothers also invested in the voyages of John Hawkins, as well as privateering voyages to the West Indies led by Sir Francis Drake. On 10 October 1560 George Wynter was appointed Clerk of the Ships for life by patent, with an annual salary of £33, 6s and 8d.

In 1571 George Wynter and his brother Admiral Sir William Wynter purchased Dyrham Park in Gloucestershire for £1,800 from Sir Walter Denys, whose health was declining.

George Wynter invested £500 in the voyage of Sir Francis Drake to circumnavigate the globe in 1577. George Wynter’s son John Wynter also joined the expedition, serving Drake as vice-admiral and captain of the 80 ton ship Elizabeth. Unfortunately John Wynter was forced to return to England after being pushed back by violent storms at the Strait of Magellan, leaving Drake to continue alone on the Golden Hind; on his return he was imprisoned in the Tower of London. Despite this setback, the voyage was a success for the Wynter family. Drake's ships returned to England in 1580 stuffed with Spanish treasure, John Wynter was released from the Tower, and Drake's investors were well rewarded; earning £47 for every £1 invested. As a result of his maritime endeavours, George Wynter was regarded by the Spanish as being as notorious a pirate as Hawkins and Drake.

== Death and legacy ==
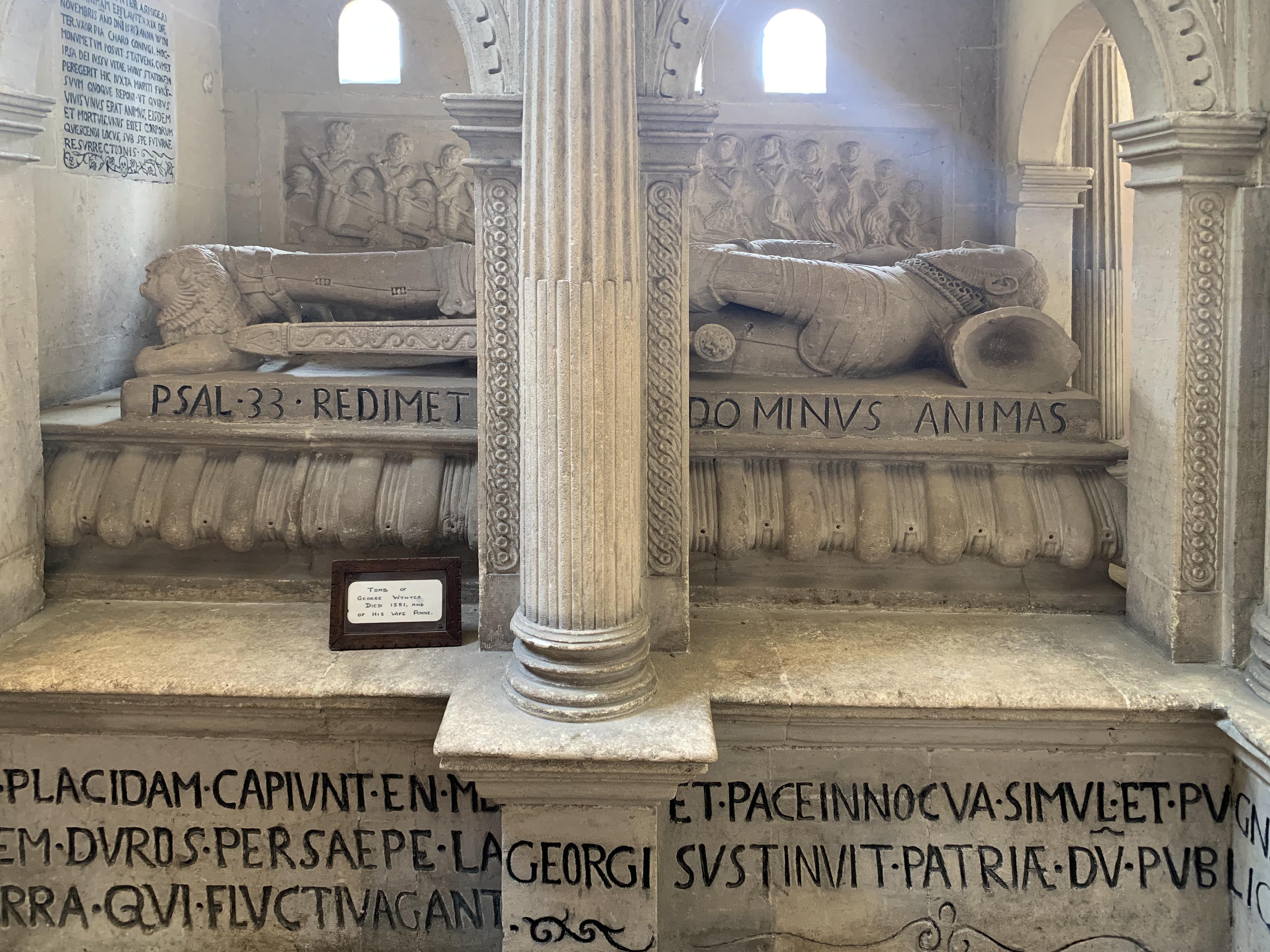
Tomb of George Wynter at St Peter's Dyrham

In 1581, a year after Drake's circumnavigation, George Wynter died, and his estate was inherited by his son John Wynter. George Wynter's elaborate carved stone tomb is located in the church of St Peter's Dyrham in Gloucestershire. The Wynter family continued to play a role in Gloucestershire affairs into the early Stuart period.

After the death of his father in 1581, John Wynter inherited Dyrham Park. An inventory dated 1601 lists a richly furnished house of 22 rooms.

== See also ==
- Dyrham Park
- St Peter's Dyrham
