= Robert de Crull =

Sir Robert de Crull
- Born: 1329
- Died: September 22, 1378 (aged 48–49)
- Military career
- Allegiance: England
- Service years: 1359–1378
- Commands: Clerk of the King's Ships; Minister of the King

Sir Robert de Crull (or Sir Robert Crull) (1329–1378) was Clerk of the King's Ships (former title 'Keeper and Governor of the King's Ships and Warden of the Sea and Maritime Parts') under Edward III of England, the first English monarch to declare England to be "the Sovereign of the Seas", and during the first year of Richard II's reign.

== Early life ==
Sir Robert de Crull was born into one of the numerous Anglo-French noble families with the same surname that were part of the Anglo-French aristocracy who formed the majority of the English nobility from the time of the Norman Conquest. Crull served as a page and then as a valet (varlet) or esquire in the royal household.

An insight into the role of the royal valet is given by one of the missions Crull's nephew, John de Crull, performed as one of Edward III's valets at time when one of his contemporaries Geoffrey Chaucer was also serving in the same capacity as royal valet. King Edward had sent him on a mission to Scotland to direct Henry Le Scrop, Ralph de Hastyngs and Roger de Fulthorp to settle the dispute between Henry Percy, 1st Earl of Northumberland and William Douglas, 1st Earl of Douglas respecting the custody of the marches of the Kingdom of England near Scotland. Already in 1367, Henry Percy had been entrusted, as Chief Warden, with the supervision of all castles and fortified places in the Scottish marches. Douglas had been made a March Warden when he negotiated a peace with the English after having taken up arms with the French. Percy therefore never trusted him and more so when he joined David II of Scotland in seeking a treaty with England to write off Scotland's debt. With the English in the midst of a war with France again, there was open hostility between Percy and Douglas.

Such a mission was common for a royal valet or esquire. Being one was a common early step for a young nobleman, especially one pursuing a career as a courtier and on the ladder to higher offices, such as the one held by Robert de Crull, John de Crull's uncle. It also led to the granting of privileges if a royal valet was in the king's favour. For John de Crull, the king granted exemptions for life "... from being put on assizes, juries or recognitions, and from appointment as mayor, sheriff, escheator, coroner or other bailiff or minister of the King, against his will".

== Historical context ==
The years of Crull's service as administrator of the navy (1359–78) were difficult ones for England. Edward III had achieved a succession of victories in France enabling him to secure great possessions. This had been another chapter in the ongoing Hundred Years' War. His claim to the French throne seemed to be about to be realised. In 1359, he began a campaign to complete that undertaking. However, after a number of battles well into 1360 the outcome was still in doubt, and Edward was forced to accept the Treaty of Brétigny wherein he renounced his claim to the French throne so that he could secure full sovereignty of the possessions he had in France.

Peace for England did not last long, for problems arose with the Anglo-Irish lords in Ireland. Lionel of Antwerp, Edward's second son, was sent with a force to subdue them which proved to be a failed venture, mainly because these lords had become powerful since England over time had allowed them to be largely autonomous. The only lasting mark on Ireland that this venture left was the Statutes of Kilkenny, which did not impede the Anglo-Irish lords notwithstanding the fact that the Statutes could be viewed as suppressive.

On 8 April 1364, King John II of France died in captivity in England. Charles V came to the French throne, and by 1369 the war with England had started anew. John of Gaunt, Edward's third son, conducted the war effort against France, which became disastrous for England. With the Treaty of Bruges in 1375, all the great English possessions in France were lost, with only the coastal towns of Bayonne, Bordeaux and Calais remaining in English hands. Edward would die of a stroke on 21 June 1377 and be succeeded by his ten-year-old grandson, Richard II.

== Stewardship of the navy ==
Crull served as Edward III's Clerk of the King's Ships from 6 October 1359 to the day he died, 22 September 1378 (the first year of Richard II of England)'s reign.

Besides facing the demands and effects of warfare on the English fleets, Crull had to deal with the costs of that warfare. The financial demands were enormous. Edward III and his ministers relied on various means to raise money which increased the taxation of his subjects. Levy and customs became the two primary ways of raising revenue. The king had to justify a levy in terms of benefits to the realm. Since the House of Commons of England had the right to grant taxes, it gained political influence; and it was during the reign of Edward III that the foundations were laid for the English brand of constitutional monarchy. Although great monies were raised through such levies and a steady source of income was derived from customs, the king and his ministers often had to rely on their own monies or take out loans from domestic and continental financiers to meet expenses. Considered as one of the king's ministers, Robert de Crull was no exception to this. That is why in 1380, John of Gaunt Duke of Lancaster's ship the Dieulagarde, and also the Graedieu, the Mighel and the New St. Mary along with the king's last galley were ordered to be sold with the proceeds to be used "to pay the debt of Sir Robert Crull who had been Clerk of the King's Ships", a debt incurred by paying bills for the king's ships in advance. This sale, according to Sherborne, also marked the dissolution of the "fourteenth century royal navy".

To man the king's ships and the ones arrested (privately owned ships pressed into service for the kingdom) also became a severe problem for Crull because of the ravages of the Black Death. There was a shortage of manpower. Men would be pressed into service at the cost to them of losing such things as their land while serving at sea. Consequently many did not want to serve, and men often fled from their ships. For example, sixty-five men absconded from the Bon Ahanja Somersett, and thirty-one men, who all came from the Medway towns, fled the Thomas de la Tour while it was docked in Kent. Lists of absconding mariners would be given to Crull's office which would then circulate them to the sheriffs for arrest. There were also problems with piracy by English crews which led to more than an occasional diplomatic faux pas, such as the men of Southampton burning a friendly Spanish target.

== The office of Clerk of the King's Ships ==
King John had developed a royal fleet of galleys. He and his successor Henry III were the first to establish an administration for these vessels and arrested ships (the defence of the realm of the sea fell upon England's merchant marine and its "arrested ships" composed most of every English fleet). The daily administration was in the hands of priests. King John and King Henry wanted a powerful and efficient administration for these vessels. Their efforts produced ones which were more informal and ad hoc. It was in Edward III's reign when a formal naval administration by lay people evolved. Initially, there were two clerks and then one. William de Clewre, Matthew de Torksey and John de Haytfield preceded Crull in the office, with Crull's tenure being the longest. Crull laid the foundations for the office and administration that would appear in subsequent centuries, such as the Council of the Marine and the Navy Board under Henry VIII and the Board of Admiralty under Charles I.

By the time of Robert de Crull's appointment, the duties of the office had been clearly defined. His chief concern was the state of the Crown's ships: the payment of the crews, the welfare of the crews (such as victualling), the repair of the ships, their safekeeping, and the state and conditions of the harbours. Depending upon the circumstances, he would also have a responsibility for non-Crown ships which had been arrested into service. Whether the ships were royal or privately owned, their operation at sea was not his responsibility. In modern terms, he was the attendant general, not an admiral; his responsibility was for the dockyards and harbours. That is why there are numerous accounts of Crull buying supplies for the King's navy, e.g. on 26 February 1366 he bought "... 7000 plus pounds of cables and cords which were paid for in gold English Nobles".
