= Controller of Treasurer Accounts =

Office of the Controller of Treasurer Accounts
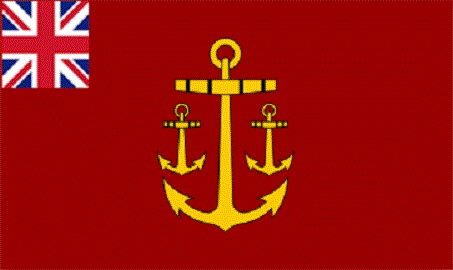
- Flag of the Navy Board shown for illustrative purposes
- Department of the Admiralty
- Member of: Navy Board (1667-1679), (1691-1796)
- Appointer: Prime Minister; Subject to formal approval by the King-in-Council
- Term length: Not fixed (usually for life)
- Inaugural holder: Viscount Brouckner
- Formation: 1667-1679, 1691-1796

The Controller of Treasurer Accounts also called Comptroller of Treasurer Accounts was the civilian officer in the Royal Navy who was a principal member of the Navy Board initially from 1667 to 1679 and then again from 1691 until 1796, he was responsible for inspecting the accounts of the money received by and paid out of the Treasurer of the Navy's department on behalf of the Navy Board. He was based in the Navy Office

== History ==
The post was created in 1667 to relieve the Comptroller of the Navy of one of his original duties. In 1668 The Ticket Office was managed by one of the members of the Navy Board. Its management was taken out of the hands of the Comptroller in 1668 and given to the Controller of Treasurer's Accounts. The Comptrollers of Treasurers' Accounts respectively inspected all the accounts of the money received and paid by the Treasurer of the Navy. In December 1679 the commissioners of the Navy Board ordered a thorough inquiry into naval expenditure resulting in the Controller of Treasurer's Accounts was abolished, and its duties reverted to the Comptroller. In 1691 after a period of internal auditing the office was restored though this time supported by an Assistant Comptroller Treasurers' Accounts. In May 1692 superintendence of the Ticket Office once again relieved the Comptroller of one of his duties and was placed back under the Controller of Treasurer's Accounts office. The post existed until 1796 when the Navy Board was restructured: the post of the three Controllers of Accounts were abolished along with the Clerk of the Acts following recommendations put forward by the Commissioners on Fees who conducted an internal audit within the Navy Office. In 1832 when the Navy Board was abolished responsibility for all accounts and accounting were now administered by the new Department of the Accountant-General of the Navy under the Board of Admiralty.

== List of controllers of treasurer accounts ==
Included:

- Viscount Brouckner, 16 January 1667 – 1679
- Office in abeyance 1679 – 1691
- Dennis Lyddell, 1 May 1691- 22 December 1717
- Richard Burton, 23 December 1717 – 14 January 1729
- Sir George Saunders, 15 January 1729 – 26 February 1735
- George Purvis, 27 February 1735 – 20 March 1741
- John Phillipson, 21 March 1741 – 29 December 1743
- William Corbett, 30 December 1743 – 31 July 1753
- Richard Hall, 1 August 1753 – 19 March 1761
- Timothy Brett, 20 March 1761 – 18 October 1782
- George Rogers, 19 October 1782 – 1796

== Sources ==
- Baugh, Daniel A. (2015). British Naval Administration in the Age of Walpole. Princeton University Press. ISBN 9781400874637.
- Office-Holders in Modern Britain: Volume 7, Navy Board Officials 1660-1832, ed. J M Collinge (London, 1978), British History Online http://www.british-history.ac.uk/office-holders/vol7 [accessed 25 March 2017].
