= Clerk of the Acts =

Former civilian officer (position) in the Royal Navy

Office of the Clerk of the Acts
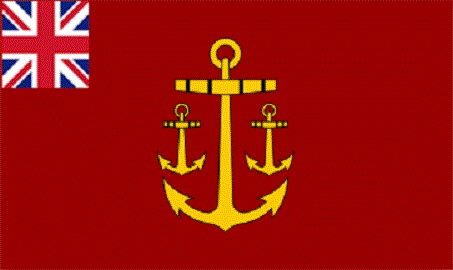
- Flag of the Navy Board
- Department of the Admiralty
- Member of: Navy Board (1546–1796)
- Reports to: First Lord of the Admiralty
- Nominator: First Lord of the Admiralty
- Appointer: Monarch, with advice from council/ministers
- Term length: Not fixed (usually for life)
- Inaugural holder: Samuel Pepys
- Formation: c. 1660–1796

The Clerk of the Acts, originally known as the Keeper of the King's Ports and Galleys, was a civilian officer in the Royal Navy and a principal member of the Navy Board. The office was created by King Charles II in 1660 and succeeded the earlier position of Clerk of the Navy (1546 to 1660). The Clerk was responsible for the organisation of Navy Office, processing naval contracts and coordinating the administrative and secretarial side of the Navy Board's work. The post lasted until 1796, when its duties were merged with that of the Second Secretary to the Admiralty later known as the Permanent Secretary to the Admiralty.

== History ==
The ultimate origins of the office lie in the reign of King John, who developed a royal fleet and the earliest known administrative structure for the English Navy, through his appointment of William of Wrotham as Keeper of the King's Ports and Galleys in the early 13th century. According to modern historians, William had a "special responsibility for ports, customs, and the navy". Murray (1935), Oppenheim (2014), Lloyd (1970) and Runyan (1987) support the view that his office continued until the creation of the Navy Board in 1546 and is therefore a direct predecessor of the later Clerk of the Acts and the Secretary of the Admiralty. However, a clear definition of Wrotham's office is not conclusive and has been viewed by other sources such as Turner (1994) to be similar to that of the First Lord of the Admiralty. King John's son and successor Henry III continued to refine the administration the royal fleet. However it was during Edward III's reign that a formal naval administration really began to evolve when the Keeper was succeeded by the office of Clerk of the King's Ships, according to naval historian Nicholas A. M. Rodger in his book The Admiralty (1979) states "Insofar as mediaeval Kings of England possessed a permanent administrator of their navies, he was the 'Clerk of the Kings Ships'. The post first appears in a distinct form under King John with William de Wrotham as Keeper of the Kings Ports and Galleys, the Clerk of the Kings Ships was not a one man department of state but a permanent agent of the crown" For a period of over 300 years this official was responsible, sometimes really and sometimes nominally, for control of naval organisation until the formation of the Navy Board in 1546. During the course of the following centuries the title changed its name. In the fifteenth century the post was known as the Clerk of Marine Causes and during the sixteenth century the office was known as the Clerk of the Navy, in the seventeenth century, Clerk of the Acts. Between the years 1673 and 1677 the office was held jointly by two clerks of the acts, and then again from 1702 until 1706. Between 1673 and 1680 the post was held simultaneously with the Secretary of the Admiralty. In the same year the Clerk of the Acts was appointed an assistant to alleviate him of some of his secretarial duties and thus separating those responsibilities from the office of the secretary. In 1796 the offices of Clerk of the Acts and three other offices, those of Comptroller of Storekeepers Accounts, Comptroller of Treasurer Accounts and Comptroller of Victualling Accounts, were abolished and the Board reconstituted; the function of the Navy Office was then supervised by three Committees, of Correspondence, Accounts and Stores.

== Responsibilities ==
The Clerk of the Acts' official responsibility's were:

- As head of the Navy Office staff
- Administering and processing of all Naval contracts.
- Coordinating the secretarial side of the Navy Board's work.
- Framing and writing answers to letters, orders, and commands from the Board of Admiralty.
- Management of Navy Board records.
- Processing of petty cash payments
- Provision, equipment and victualing of all ships.
- Superintending and organising the business of the Navy Board.

The Clerk of the Kings Ships' responsibilities were:

- Administration of ships of the Crown.
- Repair of ships of the Crown.
- Payments to all crews of the Crown's ships
- Safekeeping of ships of the Crown.
- Victualling of ships of the Crown.

The Keeper of the Kings Ports and Galleys' responsibilities were:

- Carrying out the King's orders regarding the Navy.
- Organization and general conduct on the Navy.
- Supervision of repairs of ships.
- Requisition merchant shipping in relation to meet abnormal demands of transport and supply.
- Process mariners' payments.

== List of office holders ==
Included:

Note this an incomplete list

Keeper of the King's Ports and Galleys

- William of Wrotham, 1206–1216.
- Reginald de Cornhill, 1216–?
- William de Formell ?
- Geoffrey de Lucy, 1224–?
- Hamo de Crevequer ?
- Waleran Tuetonicus, 1235–?

Note: The post is assumed to have been left vacant, this is because no official court records have been found after this date listing any other similar office holders until the appearance of the clerk of the kings ships at the beginning of the fourteenth century

Clerks of the King's Ships (also referred to as Keeper of the King's Ships or Clerk of the Ships)

- Alexander le Peyntour, 1320–?
- William de Clewre, 1336–1358, (at various times individually or jointly with de Torskey and de Snetesham)
- Thomas de Snetesham, 1336–1358 (at various times individually or jointly with de Torskey and Haytfield)
- Matthew de Torksey, 1336–1358, (at various times individually or jointly with Snetesham and Haytfield)
- John de Haytfield, 1358–1378, (at various times individually or jointly with de Crull)
- Sir Robert de Crull, 1359–1378, (at various times individually or jointly with de Haytfield)
- John Chamberlyn, 1398–1405

Clerk of Marine Causes (in official court circulars also referred to as Clerk of the Ships)

- John Elmeton, 1409–1413
- William Catton, 18 July 1413 – 3 February 1420
- William Soper, 3 February 1420 – 7 April 1442
- Richard Clyvedon, 7 April 1442 – 1460
- Piers Bowman, 1461–1479
- Thomas Rogers, 12 December 1480 – 1488
- William C'omersall, 1488 – 18 May 1495

Clerks of the Navy (in official court circulars also referred to as Clerk of the Ships)

- Robert Brygandine, 19 May 1495 – 1523
- Thomas Jermyn, and William Gonson, 1523–1533, (jointly)
- Leonard Thoreton 1533–1538
- Sir Thomas Spert, 1538–1543
- Edmund Wynter, 1544–1545
- John Wynter 1545–1546
- Richard Howlett, 24 April 1546 – 10 October 1560.
- George Wynter, 10 October 1560 – 2 June 1567.
- John Hawkins, 2 June 1567, (appointed but did not succeed).
- George Wynter, 2 June 1567 – 24 March 1582.
- William Borough and Benjamin Gonson, 24 March 1582 – 6 July 1596.
- (Sir) Peter Buck and Benjamin Gonson, 6 July 1596 – 17 April 1604.
- John Legatt, 17 April 1604, (appointed but did not succeed).
- Sir Peter Buck and Benjamin Gonson, 17 April 1604 – 24 March 1605.
- Denis Flemming, 24 March 1605 – 15 February 1639.

From June 1639 to August 1706 two clerks of the acts were occasionally appointed jointly to the office

- Denis Flemming and Thomas Barlow, 16 February 1639 – 13 July 1660, (jointly)

Note: Title of Clerk of the Navy is changed to Clerk of the Acts in 1660

Clerks of the Acts

- Samuel Pepys, 13 July 1660 – 19 June 1673
- Samuel Pepys and T. Hayter, 19 June 1673 – 14 April 1677 (jointly)
- T. Hayter and James Sotherne. 14 April 1677 – May 1679 (jointly)
- James Southerne, May 1679 – 5 February 1690.
- Charles Sergison, 6 February 1690 – 10 February 1702.
- Charles Sergison and S. Atkins, 11 February 1702 – 24 August 1706 (jointly)
- Charles Sergison, 25 August 1706 – 20 May 1719.
- T. Holmes, 21 May 1719 – 10 October 1726.
- T. Pearse, 11 October 1726 – 14 April 1743.
- John Clevland, 15 April 1743 – 15 August 1743.
- R. Osborn, 16 August 1743 – 26 July 1747.
- Daniel Devert, 27 July 1747 – 2 February 1761.
- Timothy Brett, 3 February 1761 – 19 March 1761.
- Edmund Mason, 20 March 1761 – 15 July 1773.
- George Marsh, 16 July 1773 – 1796.

== Sources ==
- Runyan, Timothy J. (1987). Ships, Seafaring, and Society: Essays in Maritime History. Wayne State University Press. ISBN 0814319912.
- Turner, Ralph V. (1994). King John (Repr. ed.). London [u.a.]: Longman. ISBN 9780582067264.
- Collinge, John Michael, ed. (1978). Office-Holders in Modern Britain. Vol. 7, Navy Board Officials 1660–1832. London: University of London – via British History Online.
- Navy Clerk of the Acts c. 1546–1660. A provisional list compiled by J C Sainty, Institute of Historical Research, University of London, January 2003.
