= Sir William Bellingham, 1st Baronet =

British politician (1756–1826)

Sir William Bellingham, 1st Baronet (c. 1756 – 27 October 1826) was an Irish-born British politician and the Controller of Storekeepers Accounts for the Royal Navy. Bellingham was charged with organizing and procuring provisions for the Vancouver Expedition. Though he never saw the Pacific Ocean, Bellingham Bay and the city of Bellingham, Washington, are named for him.

== Early life ==
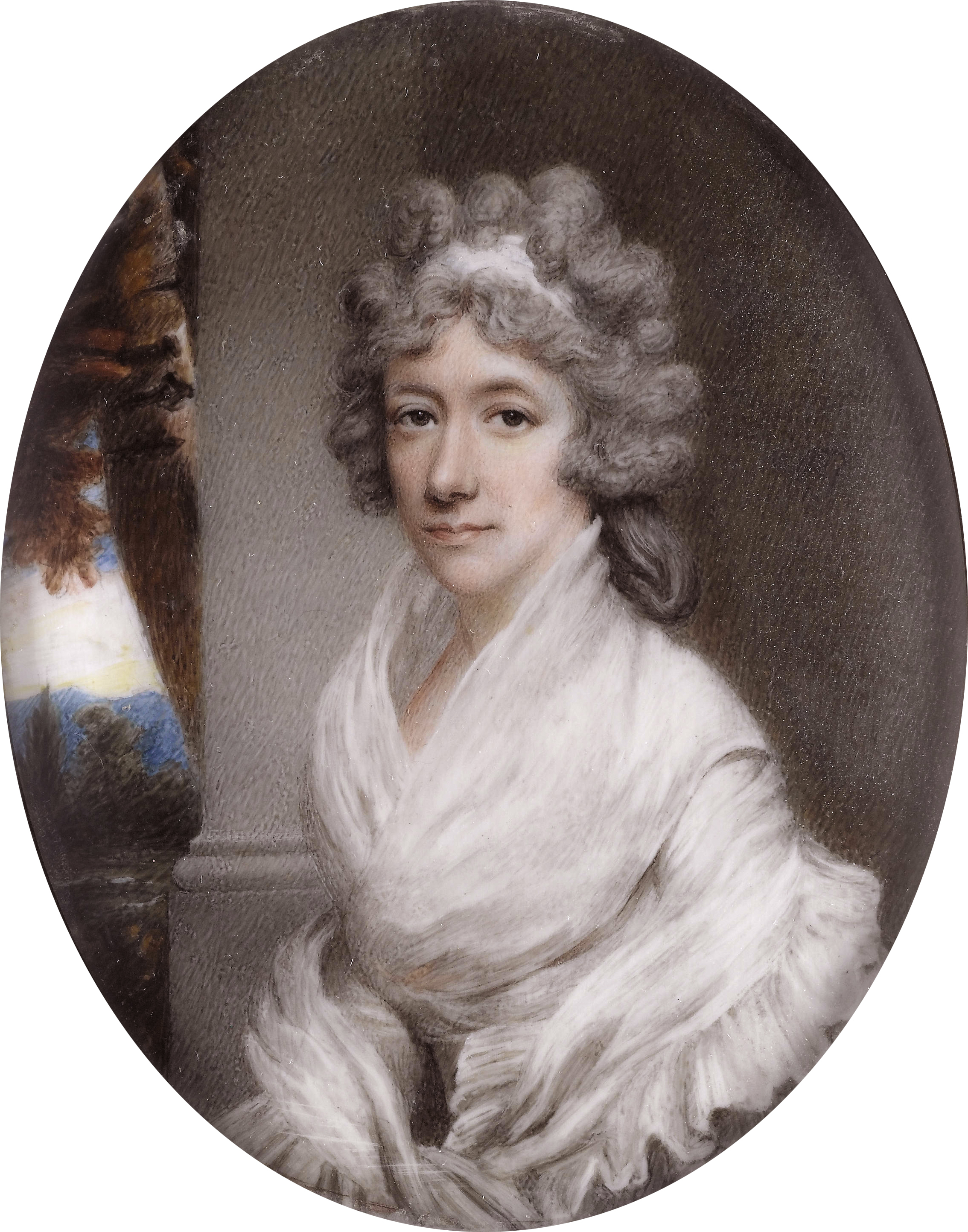
Hester Bellingham (Henry Edridge)

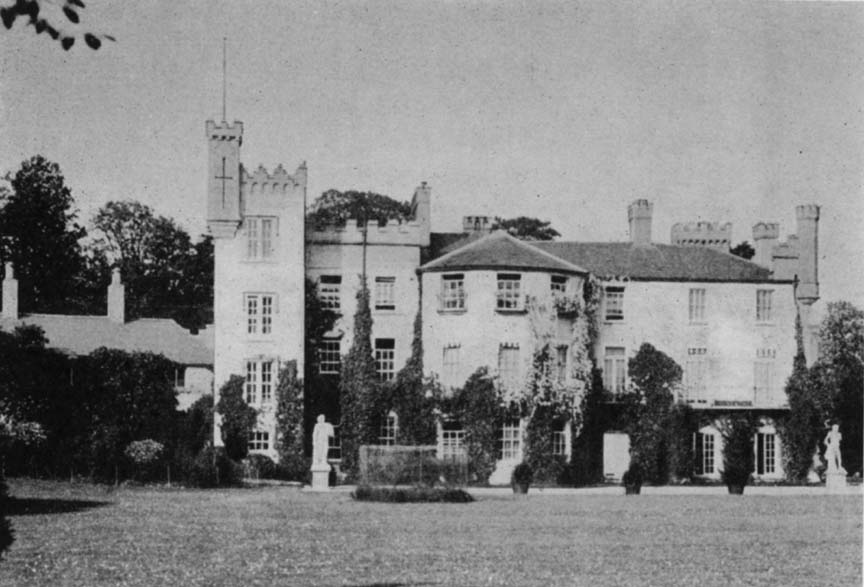
Castle Bellingham, County Louth

William Bellingham was the son of Col. Alan Bellingham (of Castlebellingham) and Alice Montgomery, daughter of Rev. Hans Montgomery of Grey Abbey House, County Down. Bellingham was one of four siblings (O'Bryen, Thomas, and Alan).

He attended Trinity College, Dublin, graduating in 1778 as a Bachelor of Arts. In 1783 he married Hester Frances Cholmondeley (1763-1844), granddaughter of George Cholmondeley, 3rd Earl of Cholmondeley and daughter of Mary Woffington.

== Career ==
Bellingham moved to Reigate, Surrey, and from 1784 through 1789 held the elected office of Member of Parliament in the House of Commons.

In 1789 he was appointed commissioner for the victualling of the Royal Navy. On 21 January 1790 he was appointed Controller of Storekeepers Accounts, a post he held until 1793 when he was succeeded by Sir Frederick Rogers. During this time he oversaw the provisioning of George Vancouver's expedition along the West Coast of North America. Bellingham Bay was named by Vancouver in his honor. Later the city of Bellingham, Washington, was named for the bay, and thus indirectly for him. He was the Receiver of the Sixpenny Office, an Admiralty fund that collected sixpence from every serving sailor's wage for the Greenwich Hospital.

He became the private secretary of the Right Honourable William Pitt, and was created a baronet, of Castle Bellingham, on 19 April 1796. He was also a Fellow of the Society of Antiquaries and was Receiver General of the Land and Assessed Taxe of London.

He died in 1826 and was buried in the family vault at St Mary's Church of Ireland, Kilsaran Parish, in Castle Bellingham.

Parliament of Great Britain
Preceded by Sir Charles Cocks; John Yorke	Member of Parliament for Reigate; 1784 – 1789; With: Edward Leeds 1784–1787; Reginald Pole-Carew 1787–1789	Succeeded by Reginald Pole-Carew; Samuel Hood
Baronetage of Great Britain
New creation	Baronet (of Castle Bellingham); 1796 – 1826	Succeeded by Alan Bellingham
