= John Wynter =

Vice-Admiral Sir John Wynter
- Born: 1555
- Died: c. 1638; Dyrham, Gloucestershire, England
- Military career
- Allegiance: England
- Branch: Royal Navy
- Rank: Vice-Admiral

Vice-Admiral Sir John Wynter (or Winter; 1555–1638) was an explorer and naval officer in the English Navy Royal. As a ship's captain in the Drake expedition of 1577–1580, he was the first European to cross the Strait of Magellan from west to east.

== Career ==
John Wynter was Captain of the Elizabeth which accompanied Francis Drake (in the Golden Hind) appointed as his Vice-Admiral on his voyage around the world in 1577. In July 1578, Drake sent Wynter ashore where he learned from indigenous people that they ate the astringent bark Winter's bark. The bark would likely aid the Golden Hind and the Elizabeth in avoiding scurvy among their crews. Wynter was separated from Drake at the Straits of Magellan.

Wynter was one of three leaders of the expedition, together with Drake and Thomas Doughty. Drake's status as a commoner caused friction with the two noblemen. Drake in July 1578 asserted full control of the expedition and had Doughty executed for mutiny. The ships passed through the Strait of Magellan, but a terrible storm caused Elizabeth to lose contact with the rest of the fleet on October 7. Laurence Bergreen in his book In Search of a Kingdom asserts that Wynter took advantage of circumstances to head back to England. Wynter "had determined that the two of them could not exist as cocaptains, not after what happened to Doughty." His decision persisted "full sore against the mariners' minds."

Bergreen's description conflicts with that of Stephen Coote. According to Coote, Wynter hoped to regroup with the fleet. He intended to sail on to the East Indies and rendezvous with Drake there, but fearing an all out mutiny he reluctantly headed back to England.

"The Vanguard's lieutenant, John Wynter, who also commanded the Elizabeth with Drake in 1578, and returned through the straits of Magellan, was Wynter's nephew, the son of Wynter's brother George, who in 1571 bought the manor of Dyrham in Gloucestershire. Kingsley, in 'Westward Ho !' has confused the uncle and nephew, and speaks of the man who commanded the fleet at Smerwick as the same that turned back through the straits of Magellan (cf. Cal. State Papers, Simancas, iii. 340-1)."

Wynter returned to Plymouth in June 1580.

== Family ==
The son of Sir George Wynter (1527–1581) of Lydney (1527–1581) and Anne (1537–1581), daughter of Richard Brayne (d. 1570) of Bristol. His uncle was the Admiral Sir William Wynter. His grandparents were Captain John Wynter, Treasurer of the Navy or Treasurer of Marine Causes, and Alice Tyrrell or Tirry (1500–1561).

He married Mary, the daughter of Sir William Brouncker. He died in 1619 and was succeeded by his eldest son George (1593–1638), High Sheriff of Gloucestershire 1631–2.
