= Controller of Storekeepers Accounts =

Office of the Controller of Storekeepers Accounts
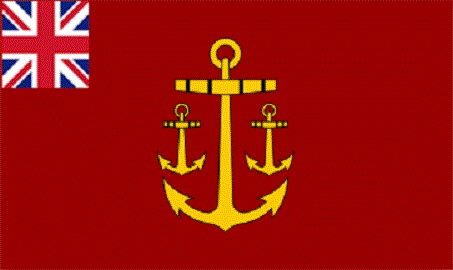
- Flag of the Navy Board shown for illustrative purposes
- Department of the Admiralty
- Member of: Navy Board (1671-1796)
- Appointer: Prime Minister; Subject to formal approval by the King-in-Council
- Term length: Not fixed (usually for life)
- Inaugural holder: Sir John Ernle
- Formation: 1671-1796

The Controller of Storekeepers Accounts also known as the Comptroller of Storekeepers Accounts was a principal member of the Navy Board who was responsible for managing and processing all naval store-keeping accounts and deliveries to naval yards from 1671 to 1796 he was based in the Navy Office he superintended the Office for Examining Storekeepers Accounts.

== History ==
The post was created in 1671, the Controller of Storekeeper Accounts department was responsible for examining all Naval Stores delivered to various storekeepers at all naval yards, in addition to auditing all their accounts. From 1796 the post was abolished and the work of this office was co-ordinated to some extent by the Navy Board's Committee of Accounts, which itself was replaced for the last few years of the Board's existence in 1832 by the Accountant-General who was one of the principal officers of the Board. In 1796 a new stores department was created from the responsibilities of the former controller of storekeepers.

== List of controllers ==
Included:

- Sir John Ernle, 23 June 1671 - 29 April 1680
- Sir Anthony Deane, 30 April 1680 - 30 July 1680.
- Phineas. Pett, 31 July 1680 - 11 October 1688. (Phineas lived 1635–94. He was the son Peter Pett of Deptford.)
- Sir William. Booth, 12 October 1688 - 21 April 1689
- Henry Priestman, 22 April 1689 - 10 July 1690
- Sir John Ashby, 11 July 1690 - 25 June 1693
- Thomas. Wilshaw, 26 June 1693 - 26 October 1702
- Henry. Greenhill, 27 October 1702 - 1 February 1705
- Thomas. Jennings, 2 February 1705 - 15 November 1714
- Charles Cornewall, 16 November 1714 - 7 August 1716
- Thomas. Swanton, 8 August 1716 - 22 April 1718
- William Clevland, 23 April 1718 - 23 May 1732
- Hon. Robert. Byng, 24 May 1732 - 28 May 1739
- John. Phillipson, 29 May 1739 - 20 March 1741
- George. Crowle, 21 March 1741 - 17 March 1752
- Richard. Hall 18 March 1752 - 9 November 1753
- George. Adams, 10 November 1753 - 19 March 1761
- Hon. William. H. Bateman, 20 March 1761 - 6 July 1783
- William. Campbell, 7 July 1783 - 20 January 1790
- Sir William Bellingham, 21 January 1790 - 1792
- Sir Frederick Rogers, 1793–1796

== Sources ==
- Office-Holders in Modern Britain: Volume 7, Navy Board Officials 1660–1832, ed. J M Collinge (London, 1978), British History Online http://www.british-history.ac.uk/office-holders/vol7 [accessed 25 March 2017].
