= Paymaster of the Marines (Navy Board) =

British Royal Navy, navy board officials

Office of the Paymaster of the Marines (Navy Board)
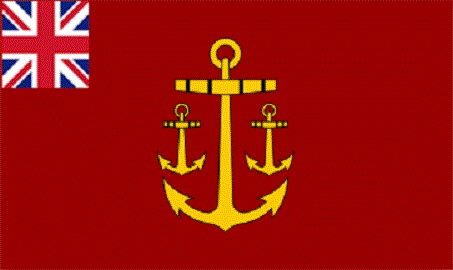

Accounts Office overview
- Formed: 1831
- Preceding Accounts Office: Marine Pay Department
- Dissolved: 1832
- Superseding Accounts Office: None
- Jurisdiction: Government of the United Kingdom
- Headquarters: Navy Pay Office; London
- Accounts Office executive: Paymaster of the Marines to the Navy Board
- Parent department: Navy Pay Office

The Paymaster of the Marines was established in 1831 following the abolition of Marine Pay Department within the Admiralty that had its own paymaster for the marines. This office holder was part of the Navy Pay Office under the Treasurer of the Navy. The post holder was responsible for processing payments to the Corps of the Royal Marines until the Navy Pay Office was abolished in 1832 as part of reforms of HM Naval Service.

== History ==
Following the abolition of the Marine Pay Department in 1831, William Robinson, then a second class clerk in that Department, was transferred to the Navy Board with the title of the Paymaster of the Marines to the Navy Board. The post holder was responsible for processing payments to the Corps of Royal Marines until the Navy Pay Office was abolished in 1832 as part of administrative reforms of the navy's civil departments by Sir James Graham, First Lord of the Admiralty.

== Duties ==
In conjunction with the Treasurer of the Navy he is to ensure he can make payments either at his office or at one of the offices of sub-accountants in order to.

1. Conduct payment of the Marine Forces.
2. Make payments for recruitment and levy money.
3. Pay barrack and infirmary expenses.
4. Pay contingencies.
5. Pay Half Pay
6. Pay salaries to civil officers.
7. Pay salaries to deputy paymasters;
8. Pay widows pensions.
9. Prepare annual estimates for the services provided his office.
10. Present a monthly statement of account to the Board of Admiralty
11. Process clothing payments
12. Process subsistence payments
13. Transmit a weekly statement of account to the Navy Board

== Paymaster of the Marines, Navy Board ==
Included:

1. 1831-1832, William Robinson

=== Sub accountants offices ===
The Paymaster of the Marines sub-accountants were located at major dockyards and included:

1. Deputy Paymaster of the Marines, Chatham Division
2. Deputy Paymaster of the Marines, Portsmouth Division
3. Deputy Paymaster of the Marines, Plymouth Division
4. Purveyor Royal Marine Infirmary Woolwich
5. Purveyor Royal Marine Infirmary Chatham
6. Purveyor Royal Marine Infirmary Woolwich

== Sources ==
1. Commons, Great Britain Parliament House of (1829). "Report on Public Accounts". Parliamentary Papers. London, England: H.M. Stationery Office.
2. Morriss, Roger; Jr, William N. Still (1997). Cockburn and the British Navy in Transition: Admiral Sir George Cockburn, 1772-1853. Columbia, South Carolina, United States: Univ of South Carolina Press. ISBN 9781570032530.
3. 'Paymaster of Marines 1831-2 ', in Office-Holders in Modern Britain: Volume 7, Navy Board Officials 1660-1832, ed. J M Collinge (London, 1978), p. 33. British History Online http://www.british-history.ac.uk/office-holders/vol7/p33 [accessed 8 January 2019].
