= Solicitor to the Admiralty =

Position in the British Royal Navy

Office of the Solicitor to the Admiralty
- Ensign of the Royal Navy
- Judicial Department
- Reports to: Counsel to the Admiralty
- Nominator: First Lord of the Admiralty
- Appointer: Prime Minister; Subject to formal approval by the Queen-in-Council
- Term length: Not fixed
- Inaugural holder: E. Whittaker
- Formation: 1692-1870

The Solicitor to the Admiralty was established in 1692 as the Solicitor for the Affairs of the Admiralty and Navy. In 1828 his responsibilities to the office were widened when the post was renamed as the Solicitor to the Admiralty. The Solicitor to the Admiralty was the Department of Admiralty's chief legal adviser and legal practitioner who acted on its behalf until 1875 following the abolition of the High Court of the Admiralty.

== History ==
From 1673 and 1696 the Counsel to the Navy Board was allowed to employ a solicitor. In 1692 a separate office for the Board of Admiralty was created called the Solicitor for the Affairs of the Admiralty and Navy, was appointed until 1698 when the office became vacant until 1699. In 1703 an Assistant to the Admiralty Counsel was established who had previously been called the Solicitor of Admiralty Droits both of these offices were then held concurrently by the same person. However the post holder was always usually known as the Solicitor instead of the assistant counsel. Following a reorganisation with the admiralty's legal department the post holders duties were expanded he was then known as the Solicitor to the Admiralty. The office holder was the Admiralty's Chief Legal Adviser and Legal Practitioner who acted on its behalf. From 1870 the post became vacant and after 1875, when the Admiralty Court became part of the Probate, Divorce and Admiralty Division of the new High Court of Justice, this office was abolished. The office holder was part of the admiralty's Judicial Department.

== Office holders ==
Note: The office holder occasionally appears in official navy lists styled differently sometimes referred to as the Solicitor to the Naval Department. Comptroller of the Droits.

=== Solicitor for the Affairs of the Admiralty and Navy ===
Included:

1. 1692-1698, Edward Whittaker

=== Solicitor to the Admiralty and Navy ===
Included:

1. 1703-1718, John Warter
2. 1718-1733, Thomas Jobber
3. 1733-1747, Francis Winnington
4. 1747-1749, Anthony Ryan
5. 1749-1778, Samuel Seddon
6. 1778-1796, James Dyson
7. 1796-1828, Charles Bicknell

=== Solicitor to the Admiralty ===
Included:

1. 1828-1843, Charles Jones
2. 1843-1862, William Frogatt Robson
3. 1862 Jan-May, Charles Fletcher Skirrow
4. 1862-1870, Alfred Rhodes Bristow

== Sources ==
1. Admiralty, Great Britain (1857). The Navy List. London, England: H.M. Stationery Office.
2. Office, Admiralty (March 1834). "Judicial Department". The Navy List. London, England: John Murray.
3. Sainty, J.C. (1975). Office-Holders in Modern Britain: Volume 4, Admiralty Officials 1660-1870. London: University of London.
4. 'Solicitor 1692-1870', in Office-Holders in Modern Britain: Volume 4, Admiralty Officials 1660-1870, ed. J C Sainty (London, 1975), p. 79. British History Online http://www.british-history.ac.uk/office-holders/vol4/p79 [accessed 5 January 2019].
5. The Solicitors' Journal and Reporter Volume VI. London, England: Law Newspaper Company. 10 May 1862.
