= Counsel to the Navy Department, Ministry of Defence =

Legal adviser to the Royal Navy (1673–1995)

Office of the Counsel to the Navy Department, Ministry of Defence
- Ensign of the Royal Navy
- Navy Board (1673-1696); Admiralty and Marine Affairs Office (1696-1707); Department of the Admiralty (1707-1964); Ministry of Defence (Navy Department) (1964-1995)
- Term length: Not fixed (typically 1–5 years)
- Inaugural holder: R Wright
- Formation: 1673-1995

The Counsel to the Navy Department, Ministry of Defence originally called Counsel to the Navy Board was an appointed legal adviser to the Royal Navy from 1673 to 1995.

== History ==
The office was originally established in 1673 when the post holder was assigned to the Navy Board only. In 1696 the office holders duties were expanded and he was authorized to act on behalf of the Board of Admiralty as well. The office was abolished in 1679, as a result of cost saving measures being undertaken in regard to cutting excessive naval expenditures. In 1696 the office was reestablished and in 1824 it was merged with the office of the Judge Advocate of the Fleet. In 1832 the Navy Board was abolished and its previous functions were absorbed into the Admiralty the office holders title then changed to Counsel to the Admiralty until 1964 when the Department of Admiralty was absorbed into the Ministry of Defence where it became the Navy Department until 2008.

From 1824 the individual appointed held both offices and titles of Judge Advocate of the Fleet and Counsel concurrently until 1995 when it was abolished. The office holder superintended the Office of the Solicitor to the Admiralty.

== Counsel to the Navy Board ==
Included:

1. 1673-1686, R Wright
2. 1685-1686, C. Porter
3. 1686-1696, W. Killingworth

== Counsel for the Affairs of the Admiralty and Navy ==
Included:

1. 1696-1702, T. Lechmere
2. 1703-1708, W. Ettrick
3. 1708-1709 C. Phipps
4. 1709-1711, G. Townsend
5. 1711-1715, W. G. Ettrick
6. 1715-1726, G. Townsend
7. 1726-1737, J, Baynes
8. 1737-1742, J. Hunter
9. 1742-1742, C. Clarke
10. 1743-1747, Hon. H. Legge
11. 1747-1757, S. Jervis
12. 1757-1770, R. Hussey
13. 1770-1791, F. Cust
14. 1791-1795 Hon. T. Brodrick
15. 1795-1801, H. S. Perceval
16. 1801-1824, Thomas Jervis
17. 1824-1828, H. Twiss
18. 1828-1832, H. J. Shepherd

== Counsel to the Admiralty ==
Note: The office holder in some editions of the official British navy list is styled as Counsel to the Naval Department.

1. 1832-1845, H. J. Shepherd
2. 1845-1849, R. Godson
3. 1849-1854, Richard Budden Crowder
4. 1854-1855, Thomas Phinn
5. 1855-1859, William Atherton
6. 1859-1863, Robert Collier, 1st Baron Monkswell
7. 1863-1866, Thomas Phinn
8. 1866-1875, John Walter Huddleston
9. 1875–1904, Alexander Staveley Hill
10. 1904–1924, Reginald Brodie Dyke Acland
11. 1924-1933, Charles Murray Pitman
12. 1933-1943, J G Trapnell
13. 1943-1945, J Lhind Pratt
14. 1945-1964, Ewen Montagu

== Counsel to the Navy Department (Ministry of Defence) ==
1. 1964-1972, Ewen Montagu
2. 1973-1986, William Howard
3. 1986-1994, Felix Waley
4. 1995 J L Sessions

== Offices under this office ==
1. Solicitor to the Admiralty

== Sources ==
1. Counsel 1673-1870', in Office-Holders in Modern Britain: Volume 4, Admiralty Officials 1660-1870, ed. J C Sainty (London, 1975), p. 78. British History Online http://www.british-history.ac.uk/office-holders/vol4/p78 [accessed 8 January 2019].
