= Marine Department (Royal Navy) =

Historical department in the British Navy

Secretariat overview
- Formed: 1755
- Dissolved: 1809
- Jurisdiction: Great Britain; United Kingdom
- Headquarters: * Whitehall, City of Westminster, London
- Secretariat executive: First Secretary of the Marine; Second Secretary of the Marine
- Parent department: Department of Admiralty

The Marine Department, originally called the Marine Office, was created in 1755 as a result of the formation of the Corps of the Royal Marines and was a department within the Admiralty. The department was a civilian secretariat responsible for corresponding with the various Royal Marine Divisions. It existed until 1809 when its functions were merged into the Marine Pay Department. The department was administered by the First Secretary of the Marine who was supported by a deputy the Second Secretary of the Marine.

== History ==
The Marine Department (originally called the Marine Office) was established in 1755 as a consequence of the creation of the Corps of the Royal Marines. under Admiralty control. The department was a civilian secretariat, whose role was to correspond and coordinate the administrative and logistical concerns of the three Marine divisions with the Admiralty that were located at Chatham, Plymouth, Portsmouth and Woolwich whose colonels were the most senior Marine officers. Subsequently, a Colonel-Commandant at Marine Headquarters in London was established as the senior officer of the Corps, the forerunner of the modern Adjutant-General of the Royal Marines. The department existed until 1809 when its functions were assumed by the Marine Pay Department.. The department was managed by the First Secretary to the Admiralty who was supported by the Second Secretary to the Admiralty who were both given the additional titles of Secretary then later First Secretary of the Marine; and Deputy Secretary later Second Secretary of the Marine.

== Head of department ==
=== Secretary of the Marine ===
- 1755–1763: John Cleveland

=== First Secretary of the Marine ===
- 1763–1795: Philip Stephens
- 1795–1804: Sir Evan Nepean
- 1804–1807: William Marsden
- 1807–1809: William Wellesley Pole

=== Deputy Secretary of the Marine ===
- 1782–1783: John Ibbotson

=== Second Secretary of the Marine ===
- 1783–1796: John Ibbotson
- 1797–1804: William Marsden
- 1804: Benjamin Tucker
- 1804–1806: John Barrow
- 1806–1807: Benjamin Tucker
- 1807–1809: Sir John Barrow

== Supporting clerical staff ==
=== First Clerk in the Marine Department ===
Included:

1. 1755–1766, G. Fearne
2. 1766–1782, G. Jackson
3. 1782–1789, J. Madden
4. 1789–1809, G. Coombe

==== Second Clerk in the Marine Department ====
Included:

1. 1755–1760, J. Clevland
2. 1760–1782, J. Madden
3. 1782–1784, J. Bindley
4. 1784–1789, G. Coombe
5. 1789–1796, B. Maxwell
6. 1796–1809, S.Moss

===== Third Clerk in the Marine Department =====
Included:

1. 1778–1782, J. Bindley
2. 1782–1809, G. Coombe

===== Extra Clerks in the Marine Department =====
Included:

1. 1755–1760, B. Rogers
2. 1755–1760, J. Madden
3. 1760–1770, H. Parker
4. 1770–1778, D. Forbes
5. 1778–1809, G. Coombe

== Sources ==
1. Archives, National (1688–1983). "Records of Royal Marines". nationalarchives.gov.uk. London, England: The National Archives.
2. Cock, Randolph; Rodger, N.A.M (September 2006). A guide to the naval records in the National Archives of the UK. London, England: University of London, Institute of Historical Research. ISBN 9781905165162.
3. 'Marine department', in Office-Holders in Modern Britain: Volume 4, Admiralty Officials 1660–1870, ed. J C Sainty (London, 1975), pp. 82–84. British History Online http://www.british-history.ac.uk/office-holders/vol4/pp82-84 [accessed 3 January 2019].
4. Parliament, Great Britain. (1797) The Royal Kalendar and Court and City Register for England, Scotland, Ireland and the Colonies. W. March. London. England.
5. Parliament, Great Britain. (1805) The Royal Kalendar and Court and City Register for England, Scotland, Ireland and the Colonies. W. March. London. England.
