= Dyrham Park =

Country house and park in Gloucestershire, England, United Kingdom

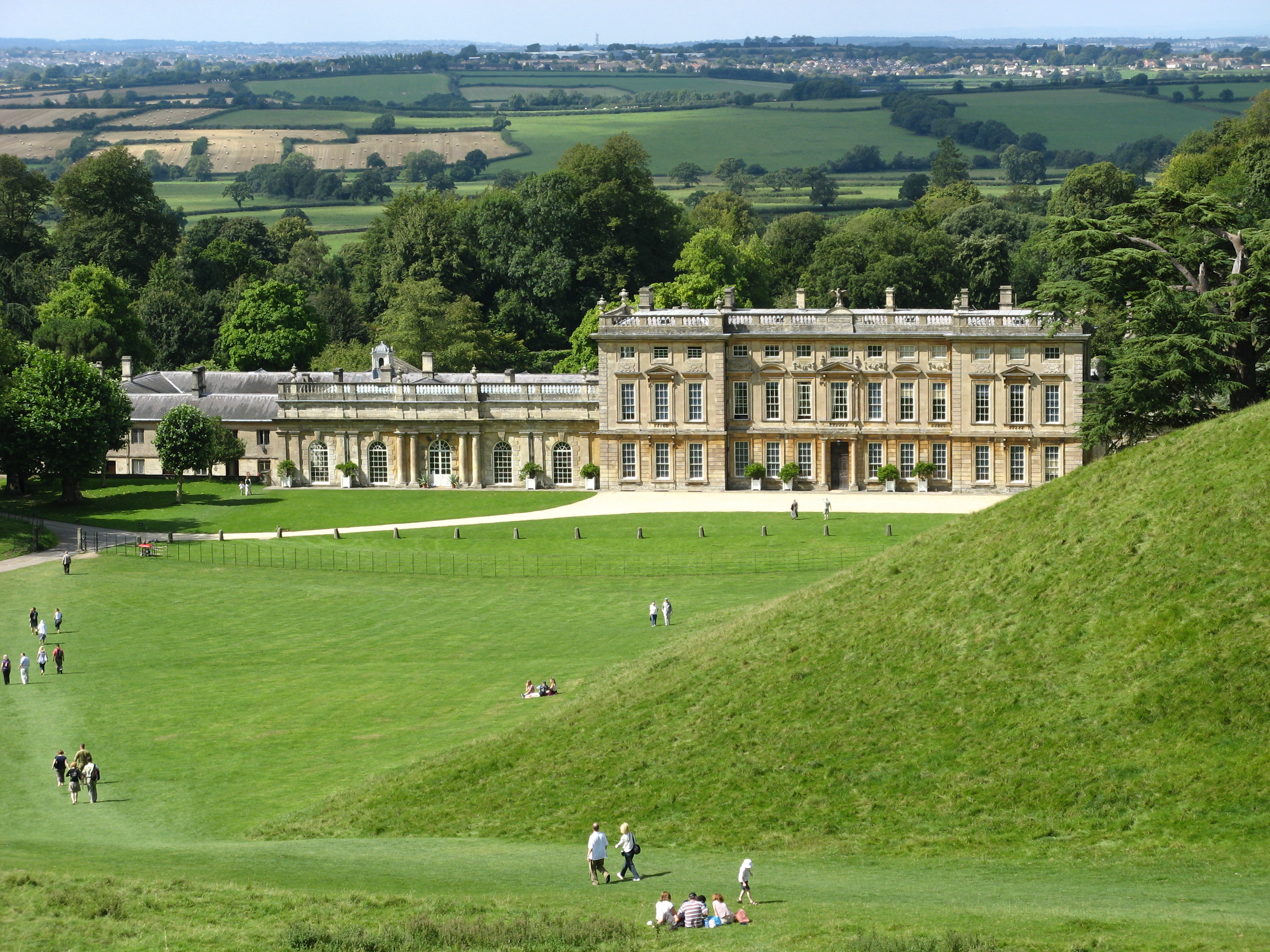
- Lower part of the park and east front of the house and orangery

- Location within Gloucestershire
- 51°28′48″N 2°22′24″W
- Type: Country house
- Location: Dyrham and Hinton, Gloucestershire
- OS grid reference: ST742757

History
- Built: 1692-1704

Site notes
- Architects: Samuel Hauduroy; William Talman
- Architectural style: Baroque
- Owner: National Trust

Listed Building – Grade I
- Official name: Dyrham House
- Designated: 17 Sep 1952
- Reference no.: 1212039

National Register of Historic Parks and Gardens
- Official name: Dyrham Park
- Designated: 30 Apr 1987
- Reference no.: 1000443

Dyrham Park (/ˈdɪrəm/) is a baroque English country house in an ancient deer park near the village of Dyrham in South Gloucestershire, England. The house, with the attached orangery and stable block, is a Grade I listed building, while the park is Grade II* listed on the National Register of Historic Parks and Gardens.

The current house was built for William Blathwayt in stages during the 17th and early 18th centuries on the site of a previous manor house, with the final façade being designed by William Talman. It contains art works and furniture from around the world, particularly Holland, and includes a collection of Dutch Masters. The house is linked to the 13th-century church of St Peter, also Grade I listed, where many of the Blathwayt family are buried. The house is surrounded by 274 acres (111 ha) of formal gardens, and parkland which supports a herd of fallow deer. The grounds, which were originally laid out by George London and later developed by Charles Harcourt Masters, include water features and statuary.

The house and estate are now owned by the National Trust and underwent extensive renovation in 2014 and 2015. They are open to the public and host events and attractions, including open-air concerts. They have also been used as a location for film and television productions.

== History ==
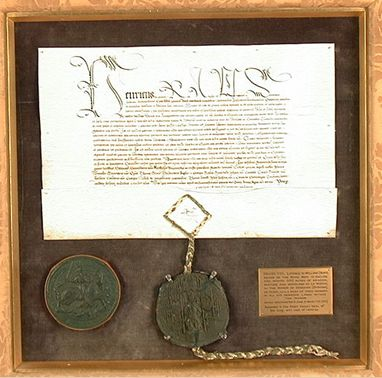
Royal licence to empark Dyrham granted by Henry VIII to William Denys, Esquire of the Body, 5 June 1511. Attached is a rare perfect example of the Great Seal of Henry VIII. Collection of Dyrham Park, National Trust

The Manor of Dyrham has been recorded since the Domesday Book of 1086, when there were 34 households. The first lord of the manor to be resident may have been William Denys, who was an Esquire of the Body to Henry VIII and later High Sheriff of Gloucestershire. He was granted the licence to empark 500 acres (200 ha) of Dyrham in 1511, although not all of this area was enclosed. This meant that he could enclose the land with a wall or hedge bank and maintain a captive herd of deer within the park, over which he had exclusive hunting rights; the name "Dyrham" is derived from the Anglo-Saxon word dirham, an enclosure for deer. The estate was sold to the Wynter family in 1571 and Sir George Wynter was allowed to empark further land in 1620.

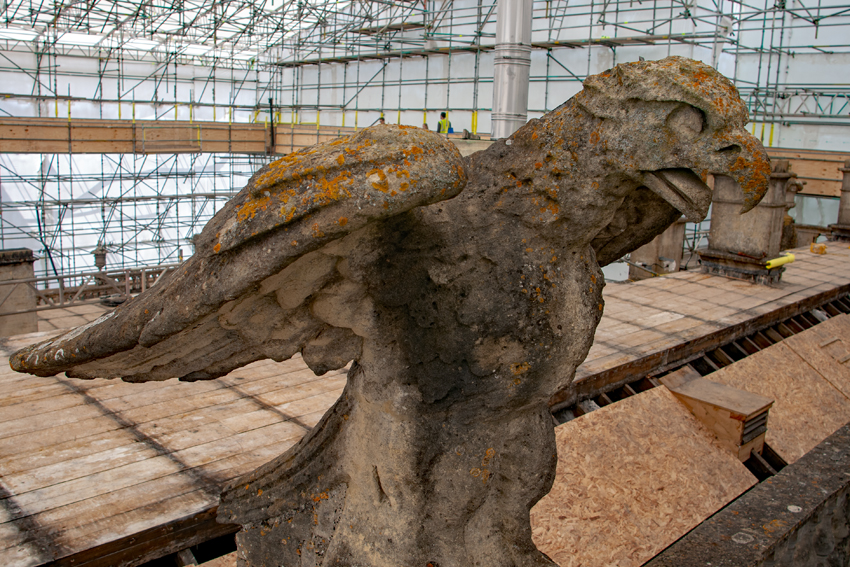
Eagle sculpture on the roof of Dyrham Park

In 1689, the estate was acquired through marriage by William Blathwayt, who was Secretary at War to William III. He retained the existing Tudor building and expanded it in stages. The west front of 1692 was commissioned from Huguenot architect Samuel Hauduroy, and includes an Italianate double staircase leading from the terrace to the grounds. In 1698, a stable block was added with space for 26 horses and servants' quarters above around a courtyard. The east front of 1704 was designed by William Talman, architect of Chatsworth. The construction of the east wing included demolition of the remains of the original Tudor house and the addition of a statue of an eagle on the roof.

Dyrham next became a showcase of Dutch decorative arts. The collection includes delftware, paintings, and furniture. Eighteenth-century additions include furniture by Gillow and Linnell. The interiors have remained little altered since decorated by Blathwayt. The gardens were designed by George London in the late 17th and early 18th centuries.

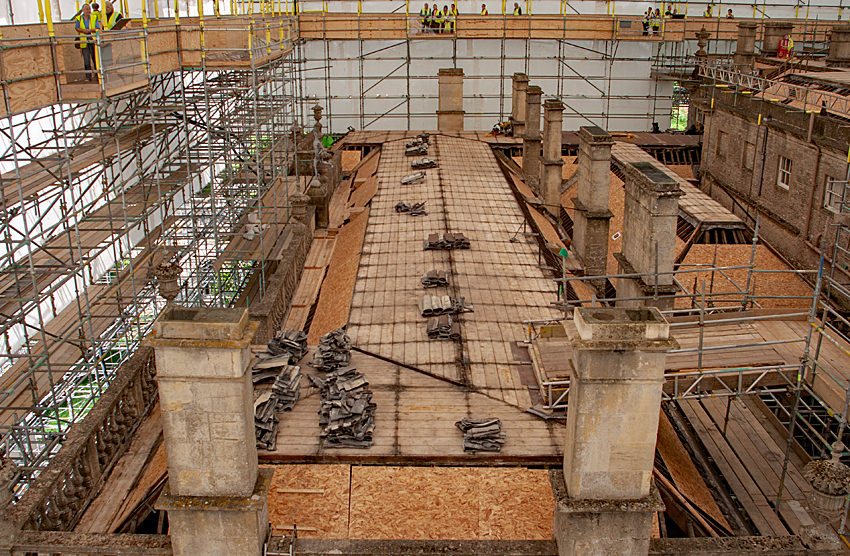
Roof repairs viewed from the walkway

The Blathwayt family owned the house until 1956, when the government acquired it. During the Second World War it was used for child evacuees while rented by Anne, Baroness Islington, the widow of John Dickson-Poynder, 1st Baron Islington (1866-1936), a former Governor of New Zealand. Lady Islington redecorated many of the rooms. The National Trust acquired it in 1961. In 2015, major renovation work included replacing the roof. Part of the cost was met from a Heritage Lottery Fund grant of £85,000. While the repairs were in progress, visitors could view the house from a rooftop walkway. In 2020, the National Trust published a report which examined the connections of its properties to the British Empire. The report's authors noted that Dyrham Park was owned by several individuals who were involved in administering colonies, including Blathwayt, who was a prominent official in the Southern Department.

== Architecture ==
=== House ===
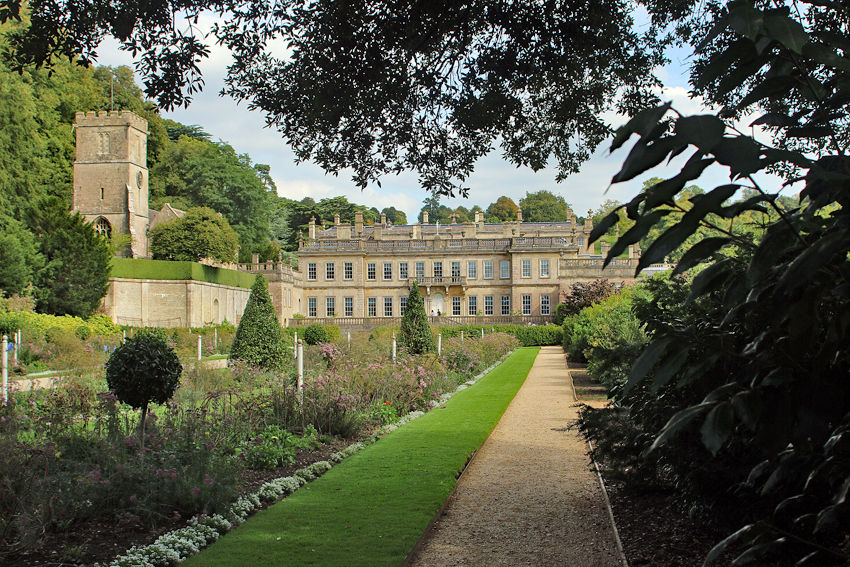
Dyrham Park west front and garden

The limestone building has slate and lead roofs above the attics. The two-storey west front, which was built in the 1690s, has three bays of each side of the central doorway, which has Doric columns, with smaller pavilions at the ends of the wings. One of the wings creates a covered passageway to the church of St Peter. The east front, which was added around 1704, has shallow projecting wings and a central door under a balustrade with an Italianate double staircase leading down to the lawns. A central pedestal is inscribed "virtute et veritate". Above it is an eagle statue, carved by John Harvey of Bath, representing the family crest of the Blathwayt family.

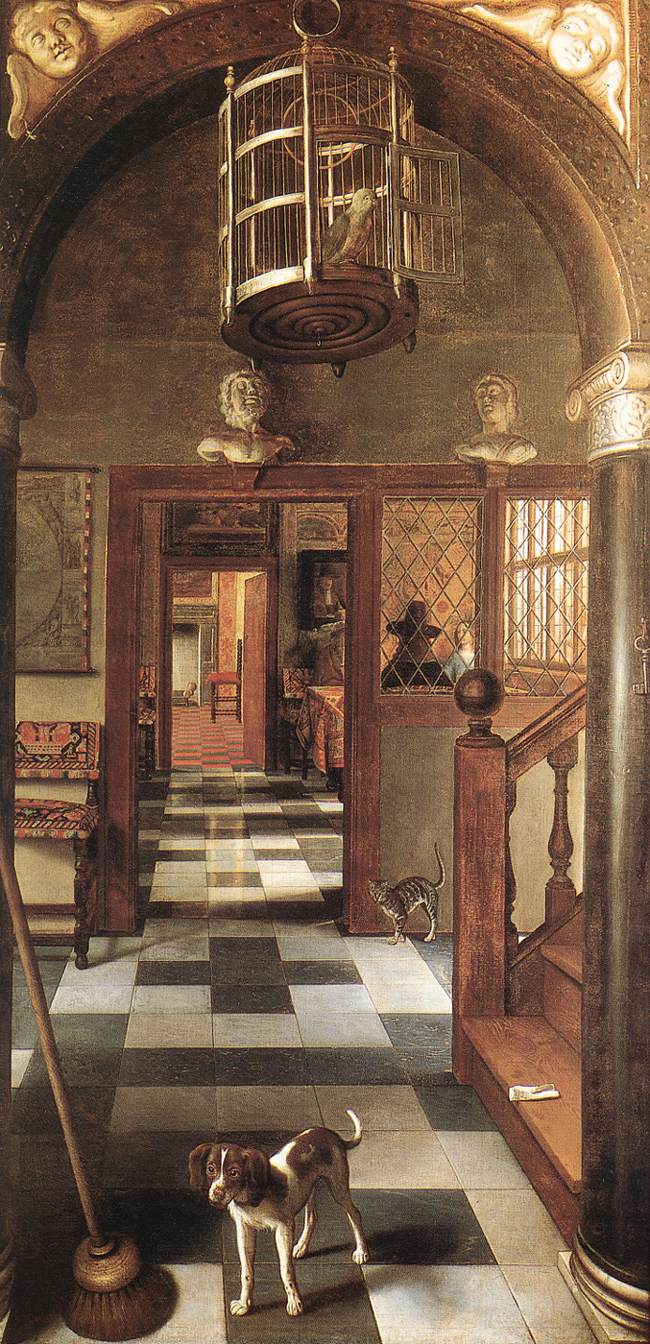
"View of a Corridor" painted in 1662 by Samuel Dirksz van Hoogstraten

The interior is sumptuously decorated with wood panelling and tiles of Delftware. The collection of artworks and artifacts includes furniture, china and pictures with a strong Dutch influence. The china includes a pair of tulip vases made in the 1680s. The state bed, with crimson and yellow velvet hangings, was made in Anglo-Dutch style around 1704. The entrance hall is hung with bird paintings by Melchior d'Hondecoeter and throughout the house are landscape and still lifes by Abraham Storck, Samuel Dirksz van Hoogstraten, David Teniers the Younger, d'Hondecoeter, and other Dutch Masters. Hoogstratens "View of a Corridor" has been hung in a doorway as the artist originally intended. Blathwayt's travels are also represented by paintings by Spanish artists such as Bartolomé Esteban Murillo and a staircase made of walnut from his estates as auditor general of the Colony of Virginia. Many of these were brought to Dyrham by George William Blathwayt after he inherited the house in 1844. There are also artifacts from Blathwayt's journeys to other parts of the world, particularly Jamaica.

=== Orangery and stable block ===
On the south eastern side of the house is an orangery, which was built as a greenhouse in 1701 and has a glazed roof which was added around 1800 by Humphrey Repton. The orangery hides the view of the servants' quarters from the main house. The servants' quarters was revised and modernised in the 1840s. It contains the kitchen, dairy, bakehouse and several larders for raw and cooked meat. There is also a servants' hall where the staff would take their meals and a tenants' hall which was used by the tenant farmers to eat on the days when they came to pay their rent. In addition to the designs for the house, William Talman created the large 15-bay stable block. It is now used as a tea-room for visitors.

=== Church ===
St Peter's Church
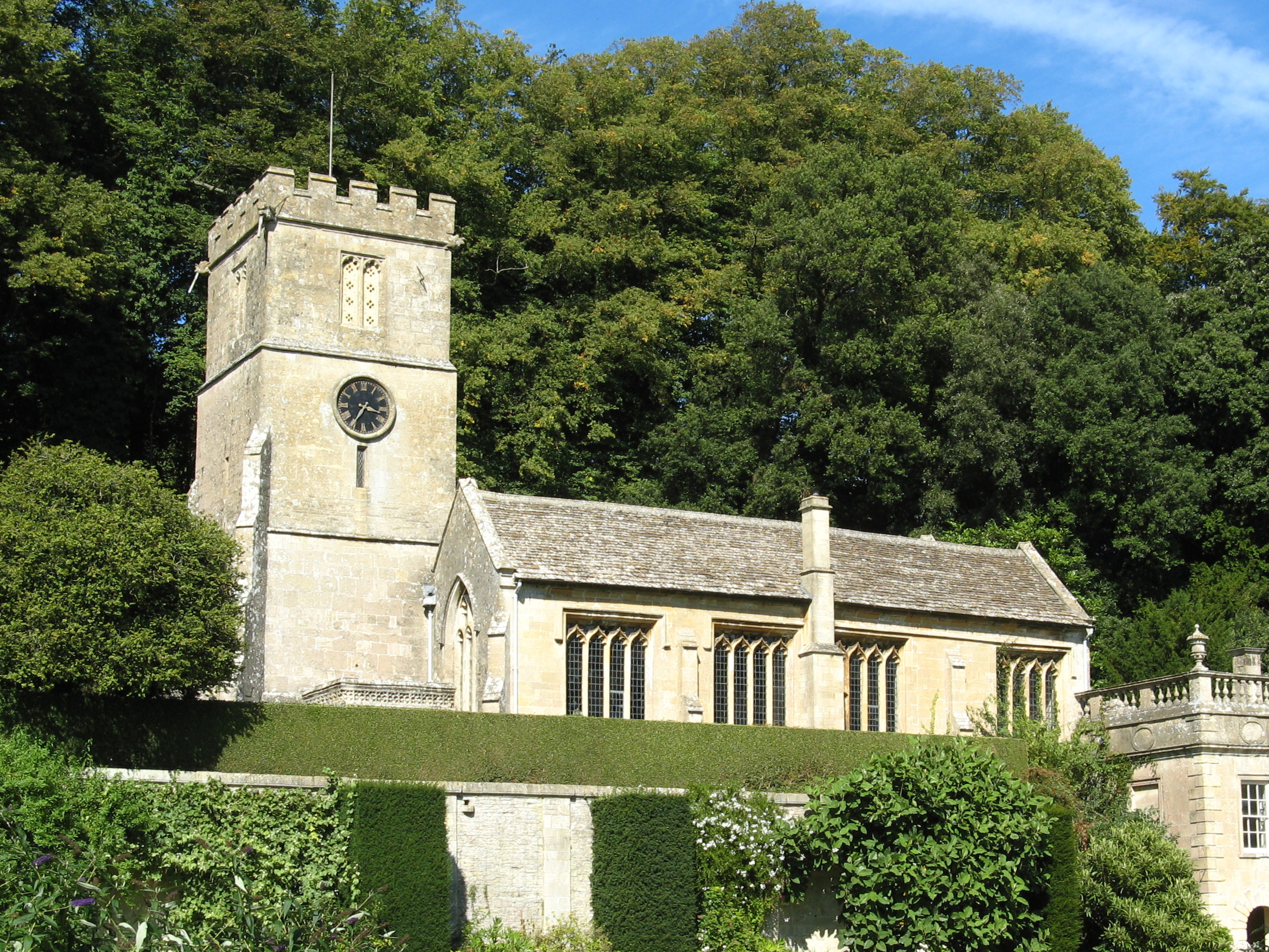
- Interactive map of St Peter's Church

Listed Building – Grade I
- Official name: Church of St Peter; Dyrham and Hinton
- Designated: 15 Aug 1985
- Reference no.: 1289711

The Anglican parish church of St Peter's Dyrham was originally built in the mid 13th century and had a three-stage tower added in the 15th, however it was extensively restored when the main house was built in the late 17th century. The church consists of a north and south aisle, chancel and south west porch with the tower to the west. In the south aisle are encaustic tiles dating from the 13th century. The font is Norman while the pulpit is Jacobean. There is also a 16th-century Flemish altar triptych.

The church is not owned by the National Trust but is closely associated with the rest of the estate and has the tombs and memorials for many owners of the house. The parish is part of the benefice of Wick with Doynton and Dyrham, within the Diocese of Bristol.

== Grounds ==
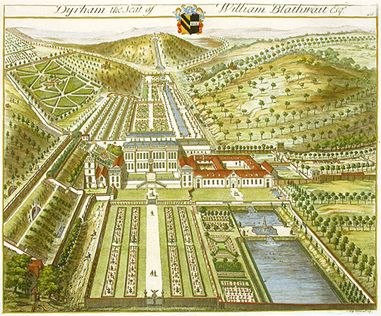
"Dyrham the Seat of William Blathwait Esq." Engraved by Johannes Kip published 1712 in The Ancient & Present State of Gloucestershire, by Sir Robert Atkyns (d. 1711)

The house is set in 274 acres (111 ha) of gardens and parkland, which was home to a herd of 200 fallow deer until they were culled due to the spread of bovine tuberculosis in 2021. The National Trust introduced a new herd of 26 deer in April 2024. Many of the walls and gatepiers were added in the late 18th century. There is statuary in the grounds, including a statue of Neptune by Claude David, about 320 metres (1,050 ft) east of the house. Artificial lakes and cascades of water are also a feature.

The gardens were designed by George London in the late 17th and early 18th centuries. They included a formal Dutch water garden, but most of the features were replaced in the late 18th century with designs by Charles Harcourt Masters. The park is listed Grade II* on the National Register of Historic Parks and Gardens.

== Public access ==
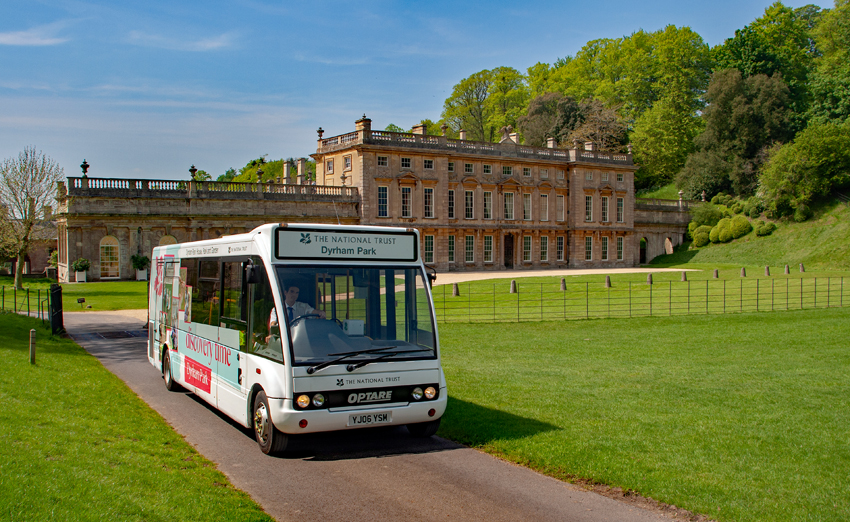
National Trust accessibility bus service at Dyrham Park

The house, garden and grounds are open to the public on certain days for an admission fee by the National Trust. A bus is available to take visitors from the car park down to the house, gardens, tea room and shop, or visitors can walk through the 270 acre grounds. There is no car parking at the house itself. Dogs are not permitted anywhere inside the grounds or garden. Events within the park include music concerts, open-air theatre productions, guided tours of the house, park and garden, and other attractions.

== Film and television ==
Dyrham Park was one of the houses used as a filming location for the 1993 Merchant Ivory film The Remains of the Day (others included Badminton House and Powderham Castle). The house was used for outdoor and garden scenes in the 1999 BBC mini-series Wives and Daughters. In 2003, it was the filming location for the BBC One series Servants. An aerial view of Dyrham Park was featured in the opening title sequence of the 2008 film Australia.

In September 2010, the BBC filmed scenes for the Doctor Who sixth series episode "Night Terrors" at Dyrham Park.

Dyrham Park was also used for scenes in The Crimson Field by the BBC in 2014, and Sanditon on ITV in 2019.

The BBC series Poldark filmed scenes at Dyrham Park, as the home of George Warleggan, between 2015 and 2018.

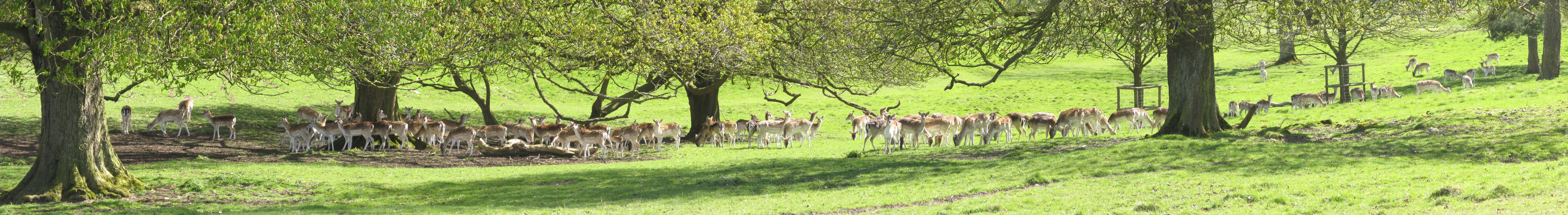
The herd of fallow deer in 2009

== See also ==
- List of National Trust properties in England
