= Navy Pay Office (Royal Navy) =

British naval finance office

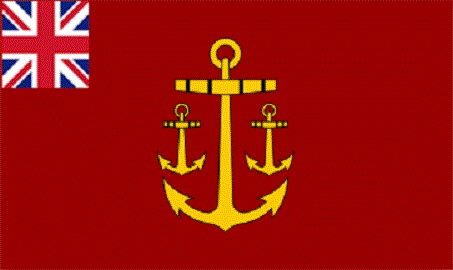
- Flag of the Navy Pay Office in 1832

Government office overview
- Formed: 1546
- Preceding Government office: Office of the Council of the Marine
- Dissolved: 1835
- Jurisdiction: Kingdom of England; Kingdom of Great Britain
- Headquarters: Leadenhall Street, City of London, (1546-1664); Broad Street, City of London (1664-1789); Somerset House (1789-1835); Whitehall, City of Westminster, London
- Government office executive: * Treasurer of the Navy (1546-1832); Accountant-General of the Navy (1832-1835)
- Parent department: Navy Office

The Navy Pay Office also known as the Navy Treasury was established in 1546. The office was administered by the Treasurer of the Navy, and was semi-autonomous of the Navy Office. It existed until 1835 when all offices and accounting departments of the Royal Navy were unified into the Department of the Accountant-General of the Navy. The Navy Pay Office received money directly from HM Treasury.

== History ==
The Navy Pay Office (NPO) was established in 1546, it was administered by the Treasurer of the Navy and existed until 1835 when all finance and accounting offices and departments of the Royal Navy were centralized into a single department under the Accountant-General of the Navy. The office was responsible processing naval finance including payments to flag officers, other commissioned officers and non-commissioned naval personnel and including the Victualling Office. The work of its staff was divided into a number of branches with specific areas of responsibility, these were overseen by the paymaster of the navy, the inspector of seamen's wills and the captains comptrolling payments of ships at Portsmouth, Plymouth and the Nore.

The Navy Pay Office (domain of the Treasurer of the Navy and the Paymaster of the Navy) was independent of the Navy Board; though the board's commissioners were required to authorize payments, all funds transferred from HM Treasury were held and issued by the Navy Pay Office (which was also known as the Naval Treasury).

== Organisation and structure of the Navy Pay Office ==
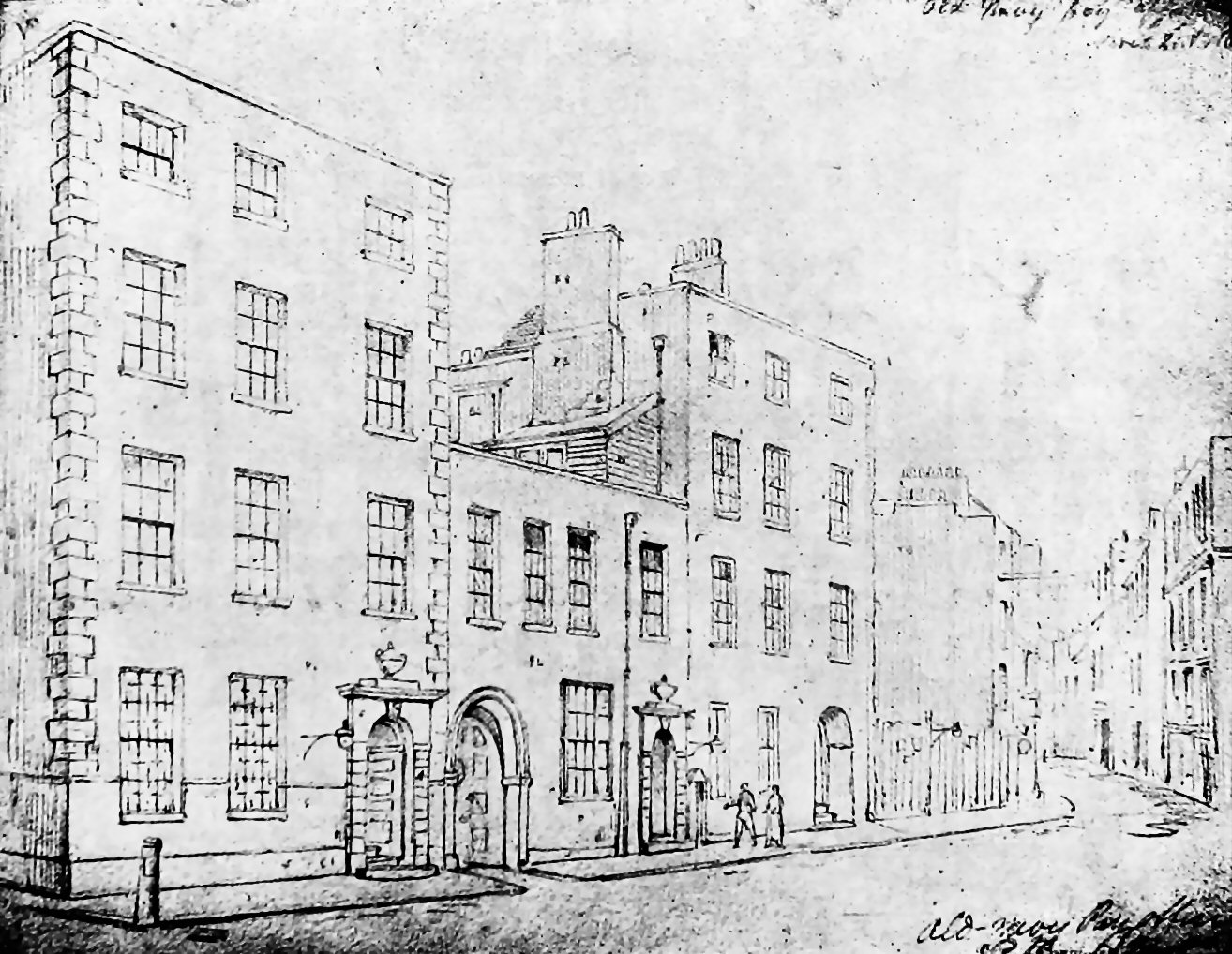
Navy Treasury, Broad Street, where the Treasurer had his official residence and offices from 1664 to 1789

The Navy Pay Office consisted of a number of specific departments and offices that included:

=== Branches ===
Each branch within the Navy Pay Office was administered by a Chief Clerk each had a head cashier together with other supporting staff.

1. Accountants Branch
2. Allotment Branch
3. Bill and Remittance Branch
4. Navy Branch
5. Navy Bills Branch
6. Prize Branch
7. Stores Branch
8. Ticket Branch
9. Ticket and Wages Branch
10. Treasurers Branch
11. Victualling Branch
12. Wages Branch
13. Wills Branch

=== Offices ===
1. Office of the Assistant to the Treasurer of the Navy
2. Office of the Captains Controlling the Payment of Ships
3. Office of the Paymaster of the Marines (Navy Board)
4. Office of the Paymaster of the Navy
5. Office of the Inspector of Seaman's Wills

== Sources ==
1. Archives, National (1563–1985). "Records of Accounting and Pay Departments". nationalarchives.gov.uk. London, England: The National Archives. Retrieved 2 January 2019.
2. Glasgow Tom. jun. (1970) Maturing of Naval Administration 1556–1564, The Mariner's Mirror, 56:1, 3-26, DOI: 10.1080/00253359.1970.10658511
3. Great Britain, Admiralty (December 1814). "Admiralty Office". The Navy List. London, England: John Murray.
4. Great Britain, Admiralty (March 1828). "Civil Departments of the Navy". The Navy List. London, England: John Murray.
5. Great Britain, Admiralty (April 1834). "Civil Departments of the Navy". The Navy List. London, England: John Murray.
6. 'Paymaster of Marines 1831-2 ', in Office-Holders in Modern Britain: Volume 7, Navy Board Officials 1660–1832, ed. J M Collinge (London, 1978), p. 33. British History Online http://www.british-history.ac.uk/office-holders/vol7/p33 [accessed 2 January 2019].
