= Armada Tapestries =

Series of 10 tapestries burned in 1834

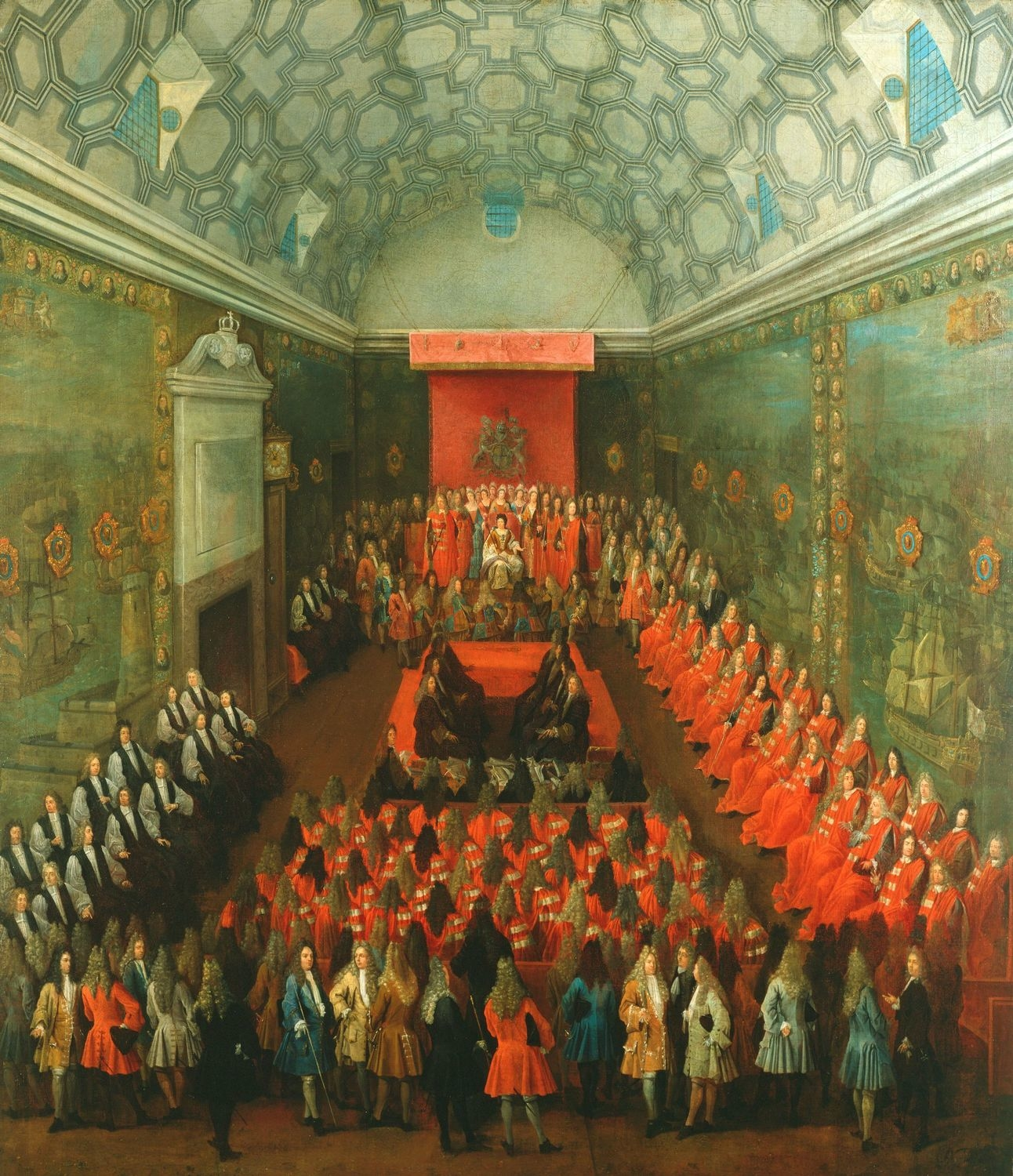
Queen Anne (1665-1714) in the House of Lords, by Peter Tillemans, a circa 1710 painting of the House of Lords showing the tapestries as they hung until they burned in 1834. Rather typically for the period, sconces have been fixed through them.

The Armada Tapestries were a series of ten tapestries that commemorated the defeat of the Spanish Armada. They were commissioned in 1591 by the Lord High Admiral, Howard of Effingham, who had commanded the Royal Navy against the Armada. In 1651 they were hung in the old House of Lords chambers, which at the time was used for the meetings of the committee of Parliament. They remained there until destroyed in the Burning of Parliament of 1834.

== The Commission ==
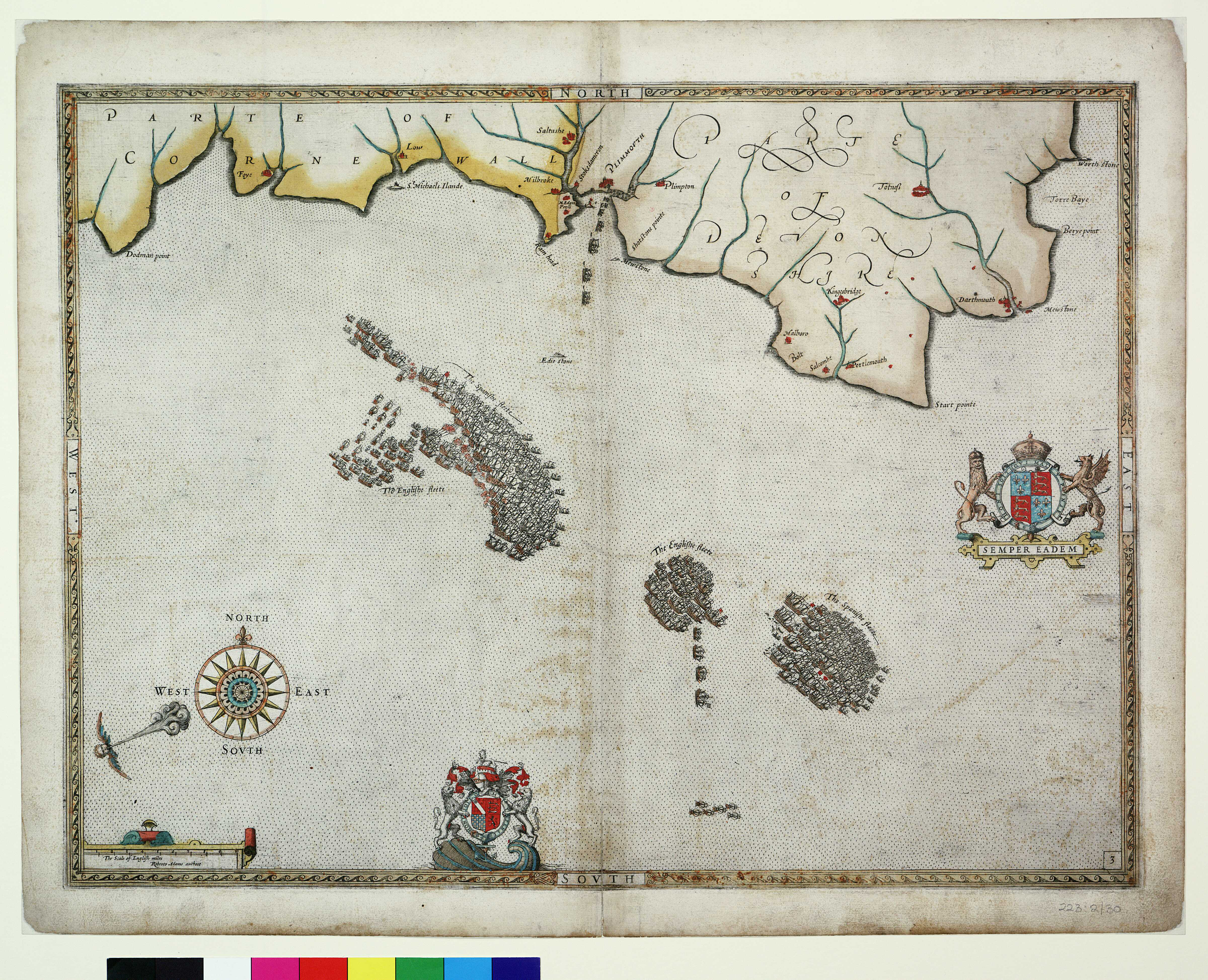
The English engage the Spanish fleet near Plymouth on 31 July 1588, one of the maps commissioned by Effingham, prepared by Robert Adams for use by Hendrick Cornelisz. Vroom, dated 1590

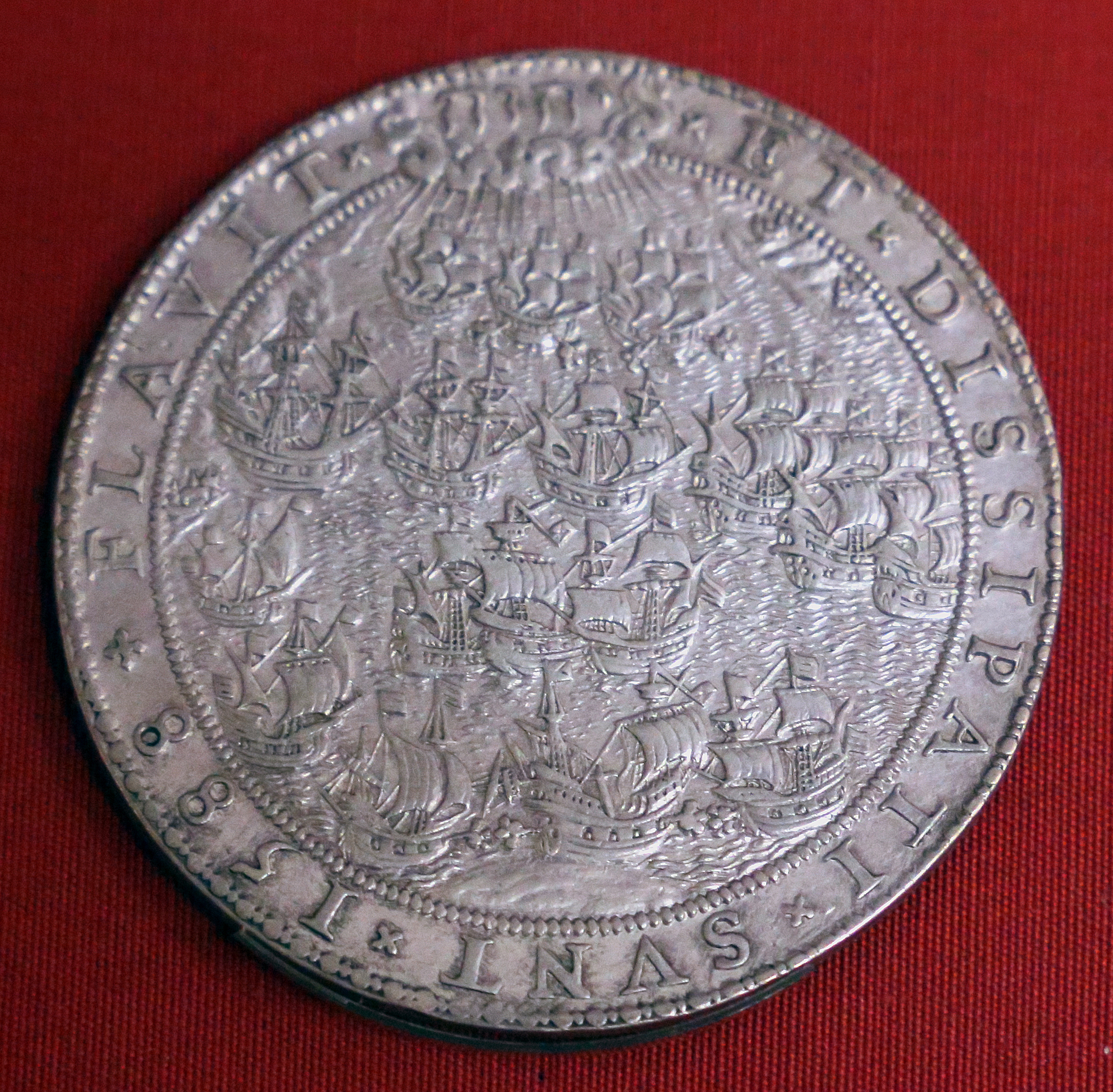
1588 medal by Gerard van Bylaer, produced by the Middelburg, Zeeland mint to honor God and Maurice of Orange, not the English fleet, for delivering the United Provinces from the Spanish Armada

The Queen's Surveyor of Buildings, Robert Adams, had been instructed by Effingham shortly after the battle in 1590 to make maps of the engagements between the English and Spanish navies. The Dutch painter Hendrick Cornelisz Vroom used these as inspiration for his bird's eye view designs. The tapestries were probably woven in the Delft workshops of François Spierincx. Spierincx later supplied three (or five) other tapestries to James VI and I in 1607.

By 1590 the Dutch were well accustomed to minting jetons and medals to celebrate their local victories over the Spanish army and in 1591 were preparing for a second invasion of the Spanish by sea by celebrating their role in the defeat of the Spanish Armada in 1588 as well. Probably Effingham realized the propaganda value of that story and wanted to deemphasize the role of God and emphasize his own role as fleet commander. His commission was also honoring the concept of a "Royal Navy" led by Elizabeth I by bestowing upon her the role of national, religious and military leader. He presented the English fleet as a unified naval force acting in unity though it had been a loose group of ships which until then had preyed in a pirate's role on the Spanish treasure fleet, paid for by the admirals themselves. The narrative as presented by the tapestries make no mention of the Dutch participation at all.

== Portraits in the borders ==
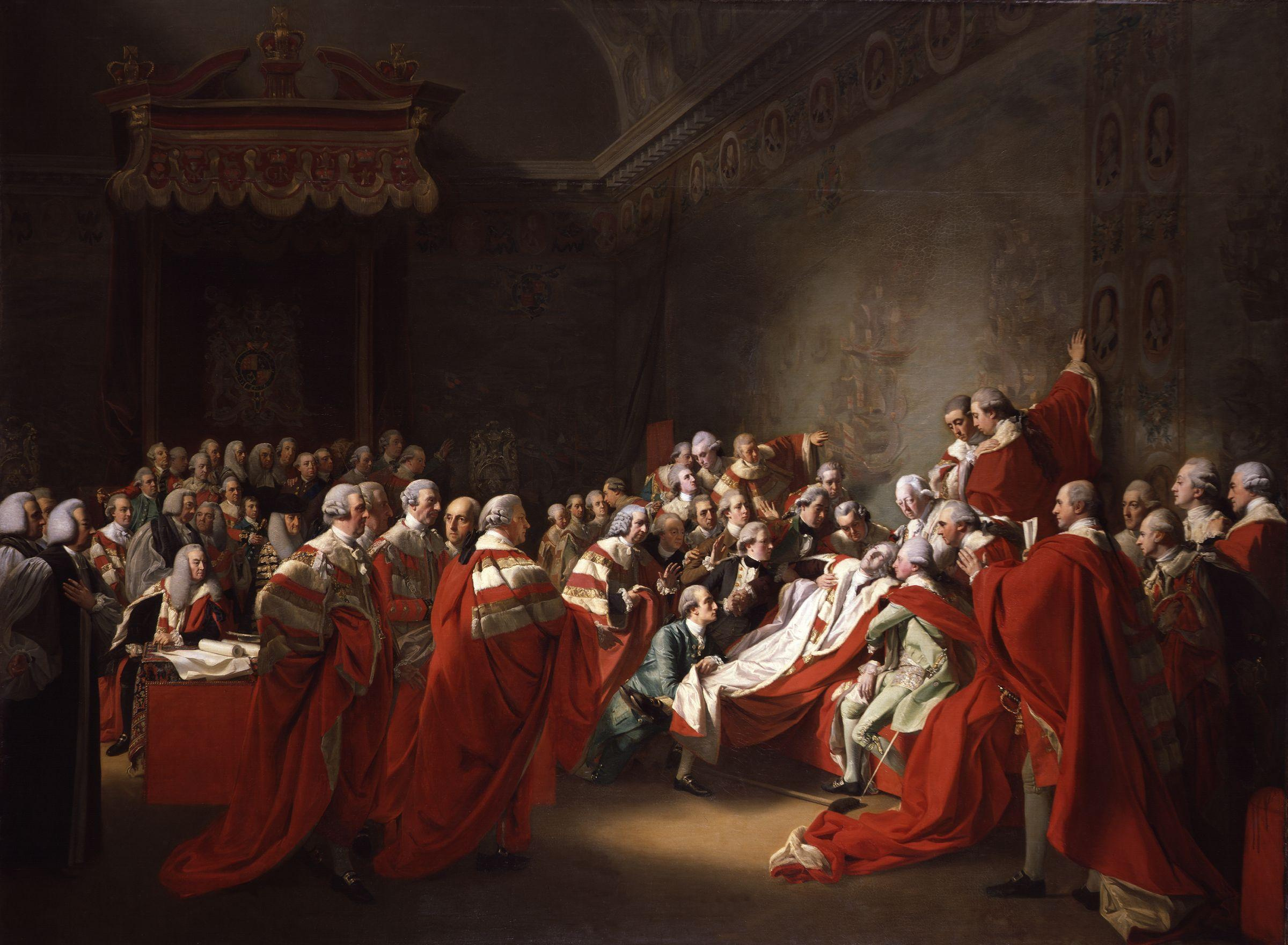
Copley's Collapse of Chatham in 1778 (1781) shows the tapestries with some of the border portraits behind the gathered lords

The tapestries included portraits of commanders, captains, and other worthies in the borders. These included: Christopher Baker; George Beeston; Charles Blount; Robert Carey; Captain Crosse; the Earl of Cumberland; Francis Drake; Charles Howard, Lord Effingham; Martin Frobisher; Thomas Garrat; Benjamin Gonson; John Hawkins; Edward Hoby; Lord Thomas Howard; Master Knyvet; the Earl of Northumberland; Horatio Palavicino; George Pinner; Captain Penton; Lord Henry Seymour; Lord Sheffield; Robert Southwell; Thomas Cecil; Roger Townshend; Thomas Vavasour; Master Willoughby; and William Wynter.

== Bought for the royal collection ==
In 1595 Effingham paid £1,582 for the completed tapestries and they were clearly a success, for in 1616 he sold them at a profit to James I for £1,628-8-0. The tapestries had already been displayed in the Great Hall at Whitehall Palace for the wedding of Princess Elizabeth and Frederick V of the Palatinate on 14 February 1613.

The tapestries were inherited by Charles I who was apparently embarrassed to be reminded of his unsuccessful expedition to Spain in 1623, and he had them moved to Oatlands.

== Commonwealth ==
The ten tapestries were subsequently put in storage at the Tower of London. In 1644 six pieces were hung in the White Chamber of the old Palace of Westminster where the lords of Parliament met. After the execution of Charles I in 1649, Parliament ordered inventories of the goods belonging to Charles to be drawn up in preparation for their sale. The tapestries, listed at the Royal Wardrobe in the Tower of London, were valued at £2,113-10-0.

The Council of State decided to retain the tapestries of "the story of the eighty eight" for Oliver Cromwell's use at Whitehall Palace.

The tapestry was returned to the old Court of Requests at Westminster, where the House of Lords sat. A German visitor Zacharias Conrad van Uffenback saw them in 1710 and commented on their poor condition. In the 1730s a new doorway was made into the chamber, and a piece was cut out which later came into the possession of the Corporation of Plymouth. Eight of the tapestries were cleaned and repaired in 1760 by Peter Saunders.

== John Pine ==
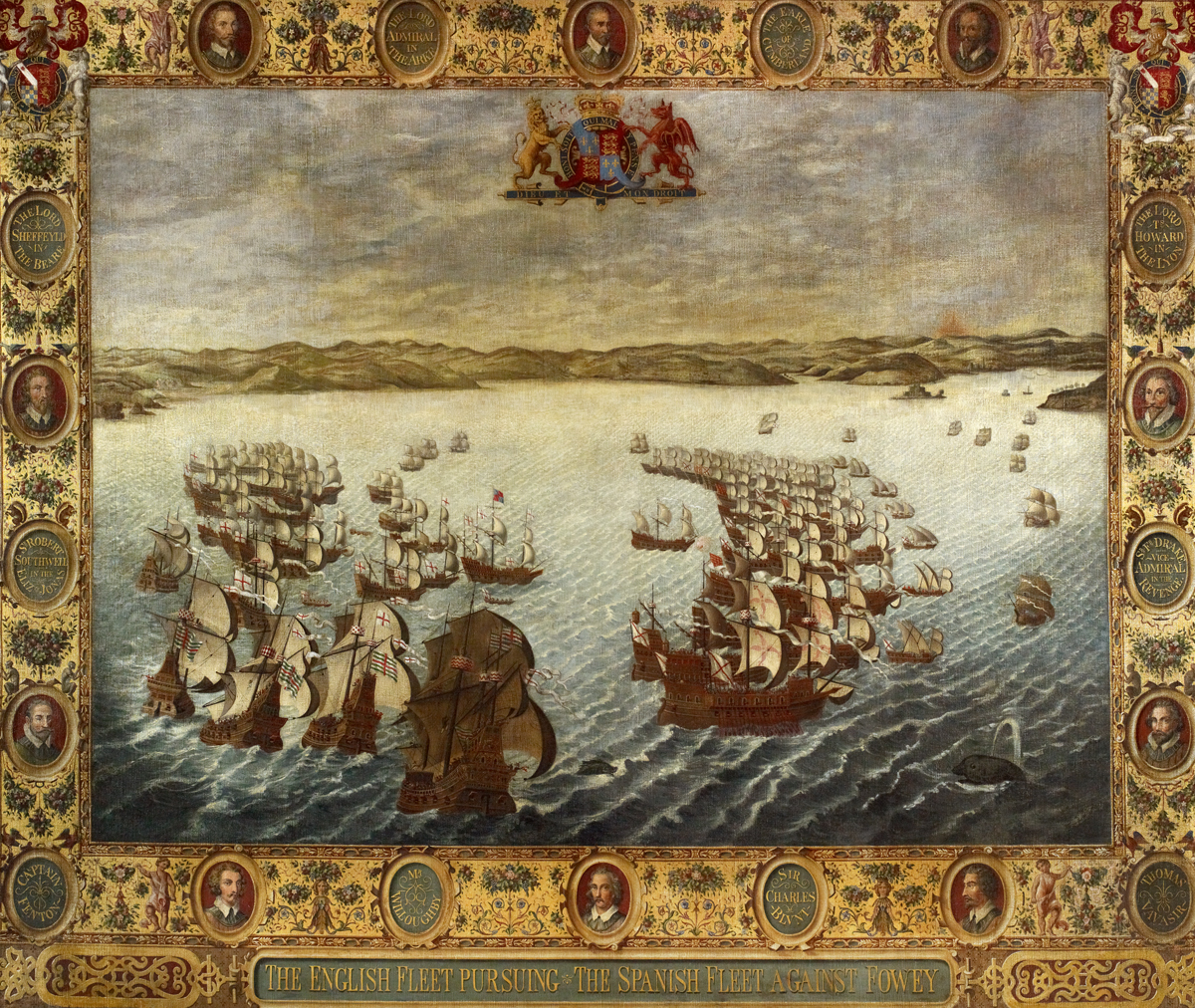
19th-century painted reproduction by Richard Burchett after the 1834 fire, based on Pine's 1739 print of the second tapestry

In 1739 John Pine made engravings of the tapestries based on the drawings of Clement Lemprière. Lempriere in turn used the original maps by Adams.

The tapestries can be seen in John Singleton Copley's painting The Death of the Earl of Chatham.

== Engravings from John Pine's 1739 publication ==
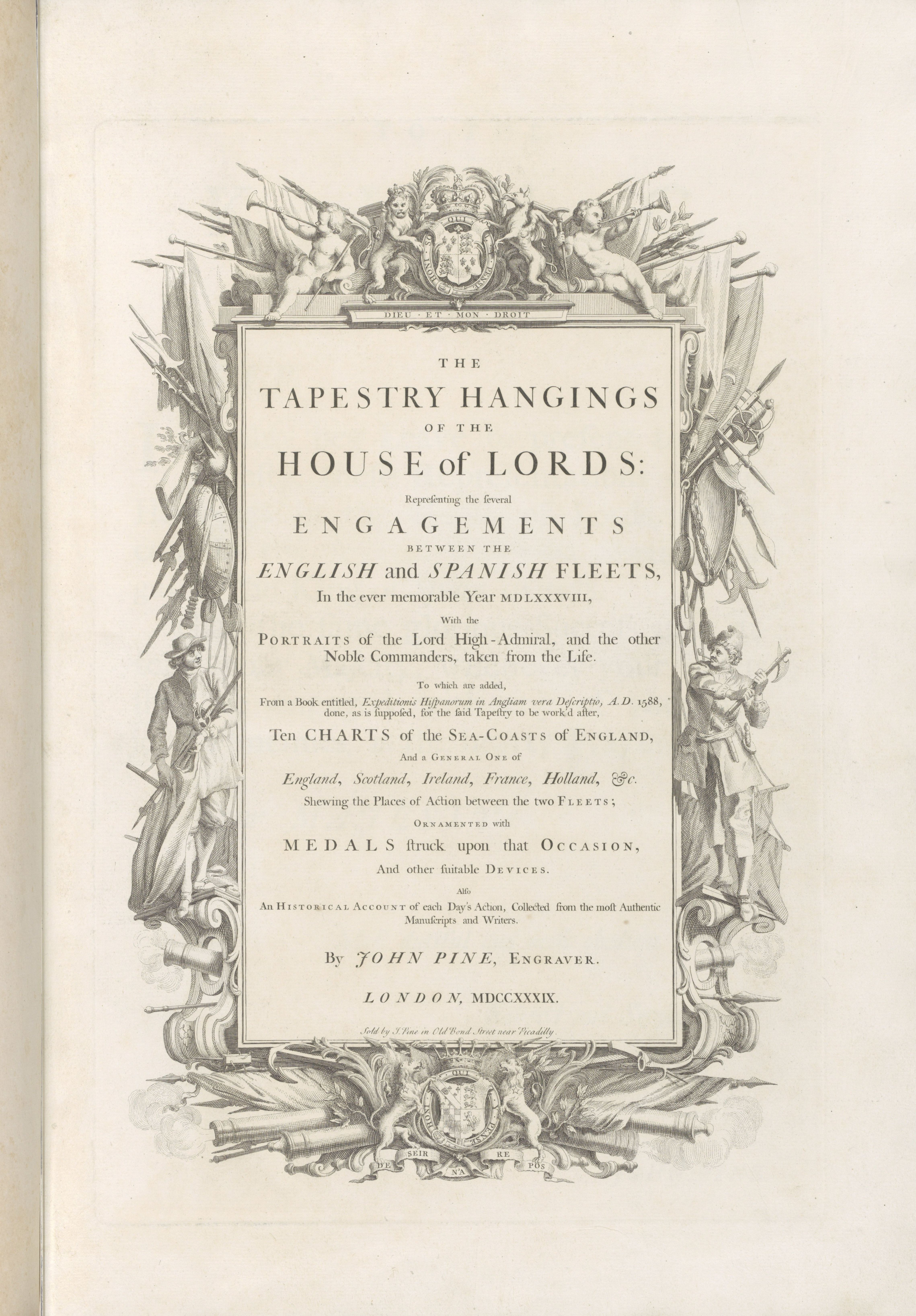
Titlepage

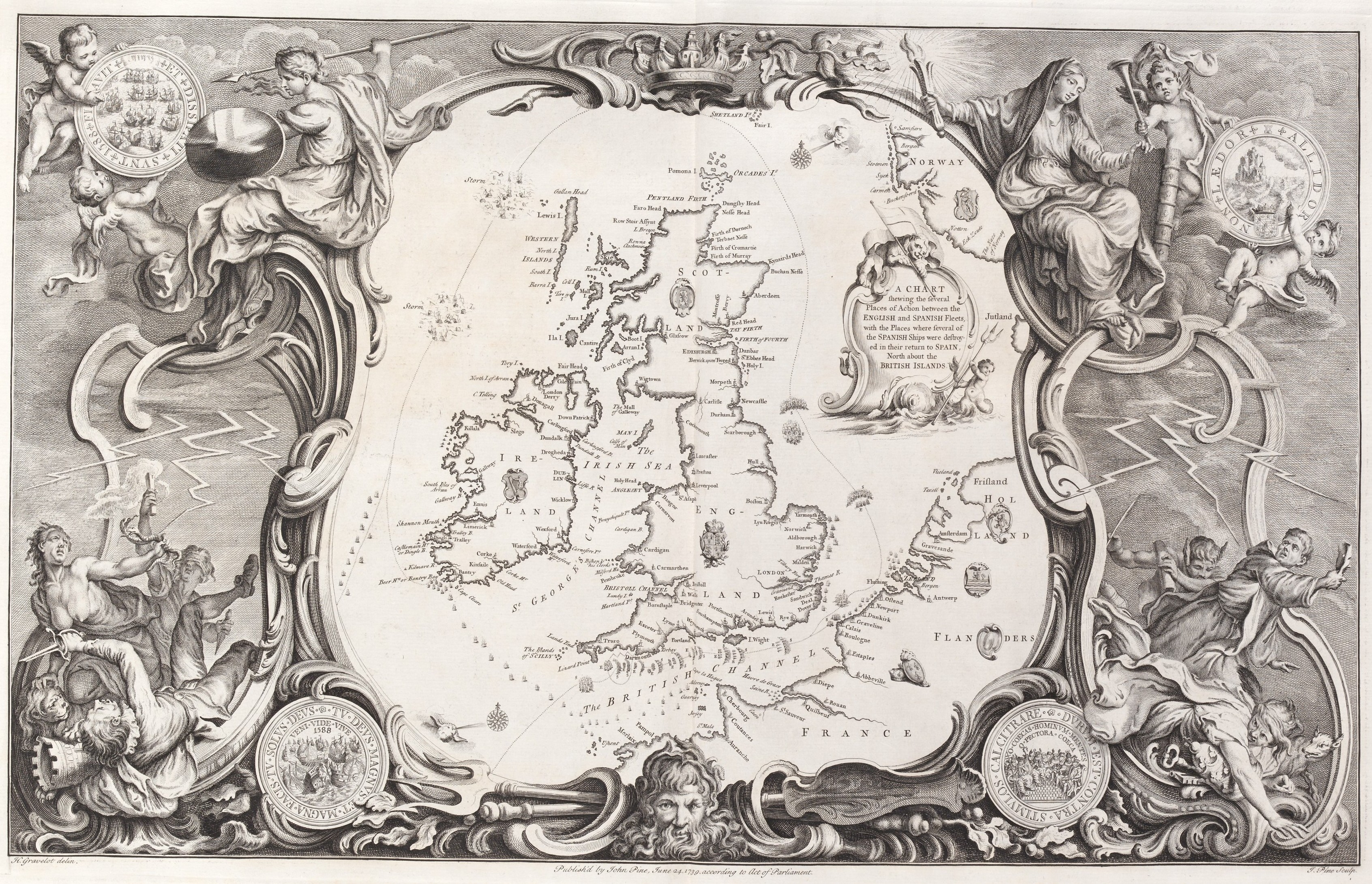
Overview map

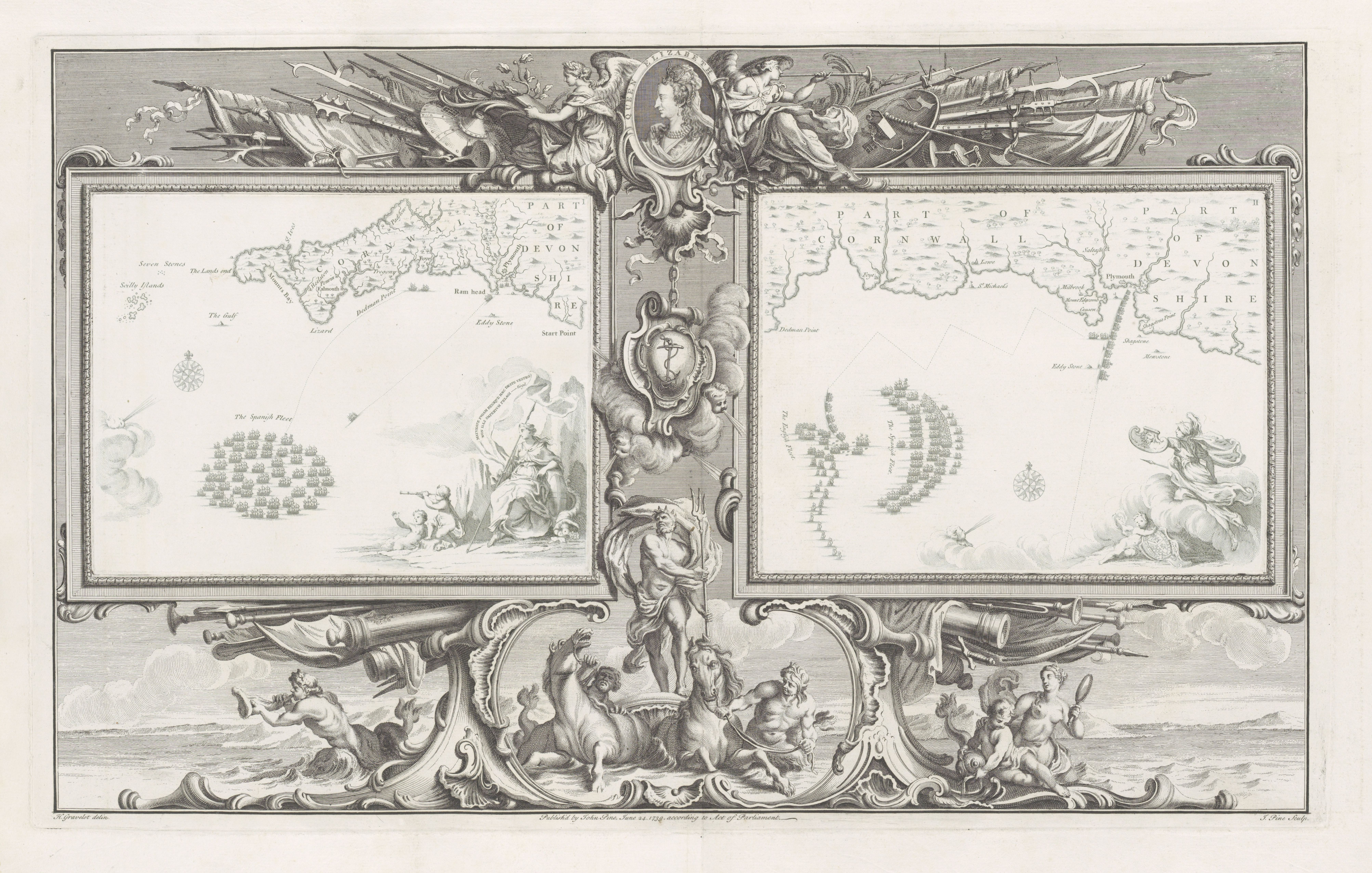
2 maps which inspired tapestries 1 & 2

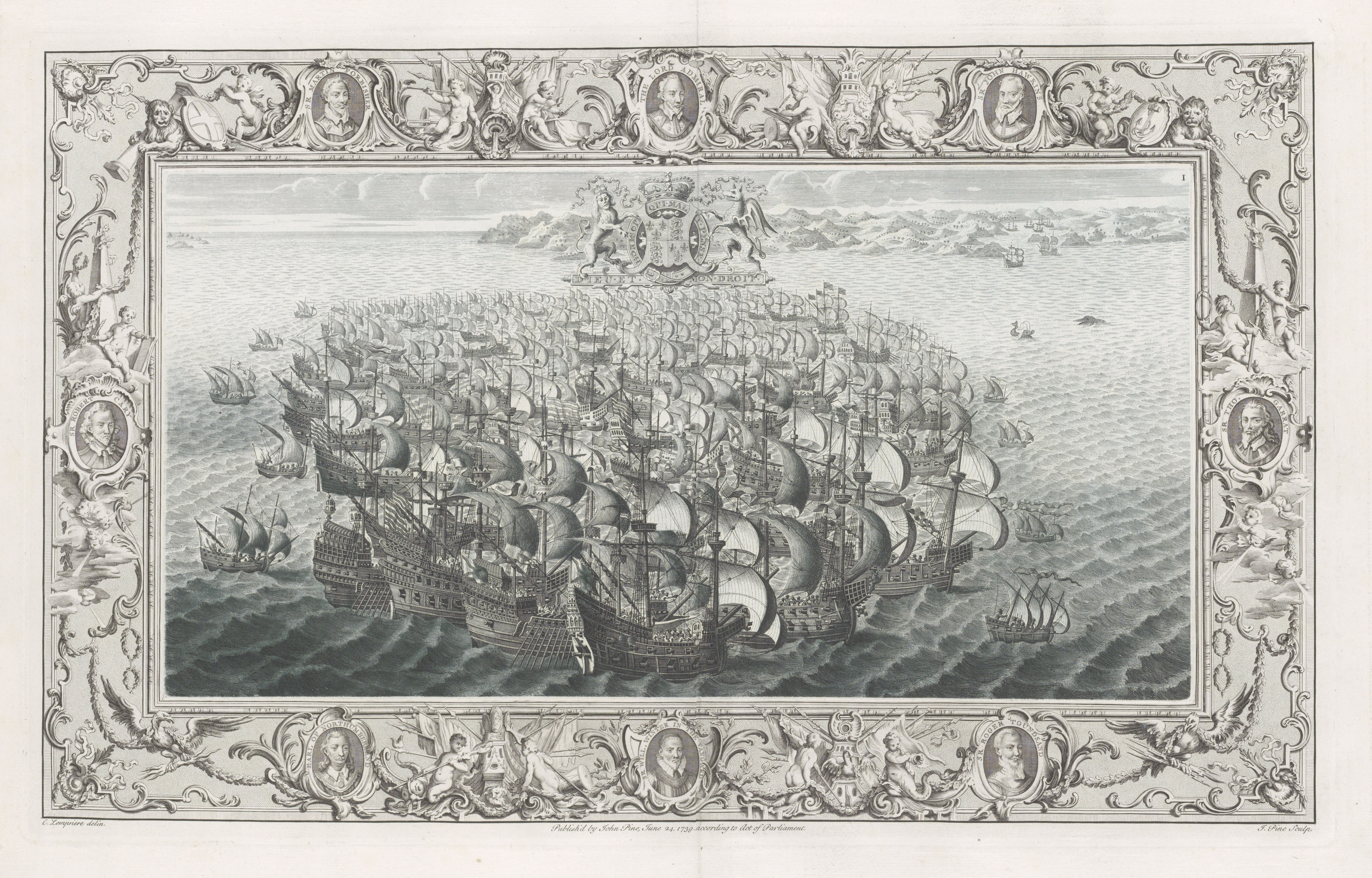
Tapestry 1

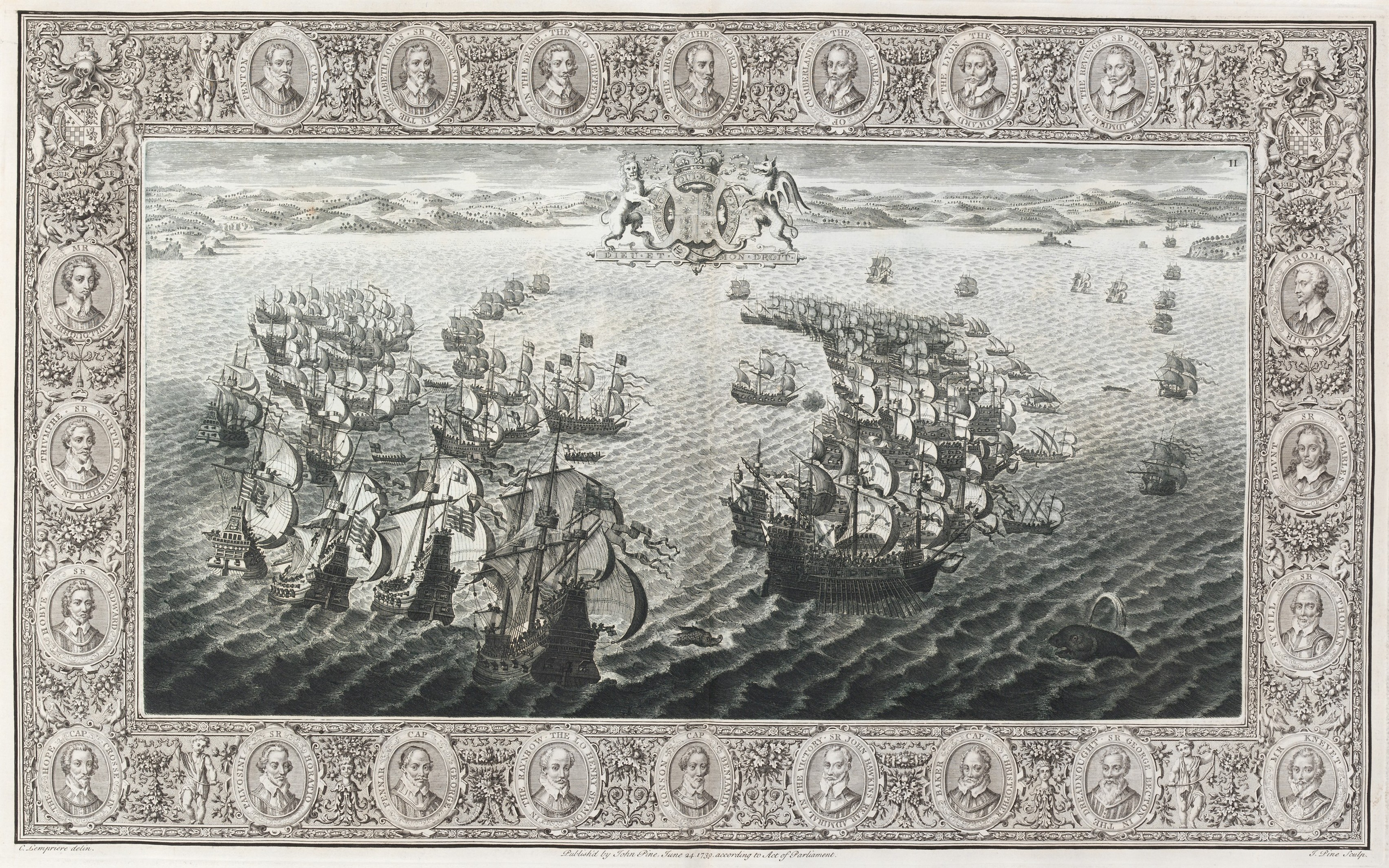
Tapestry 2

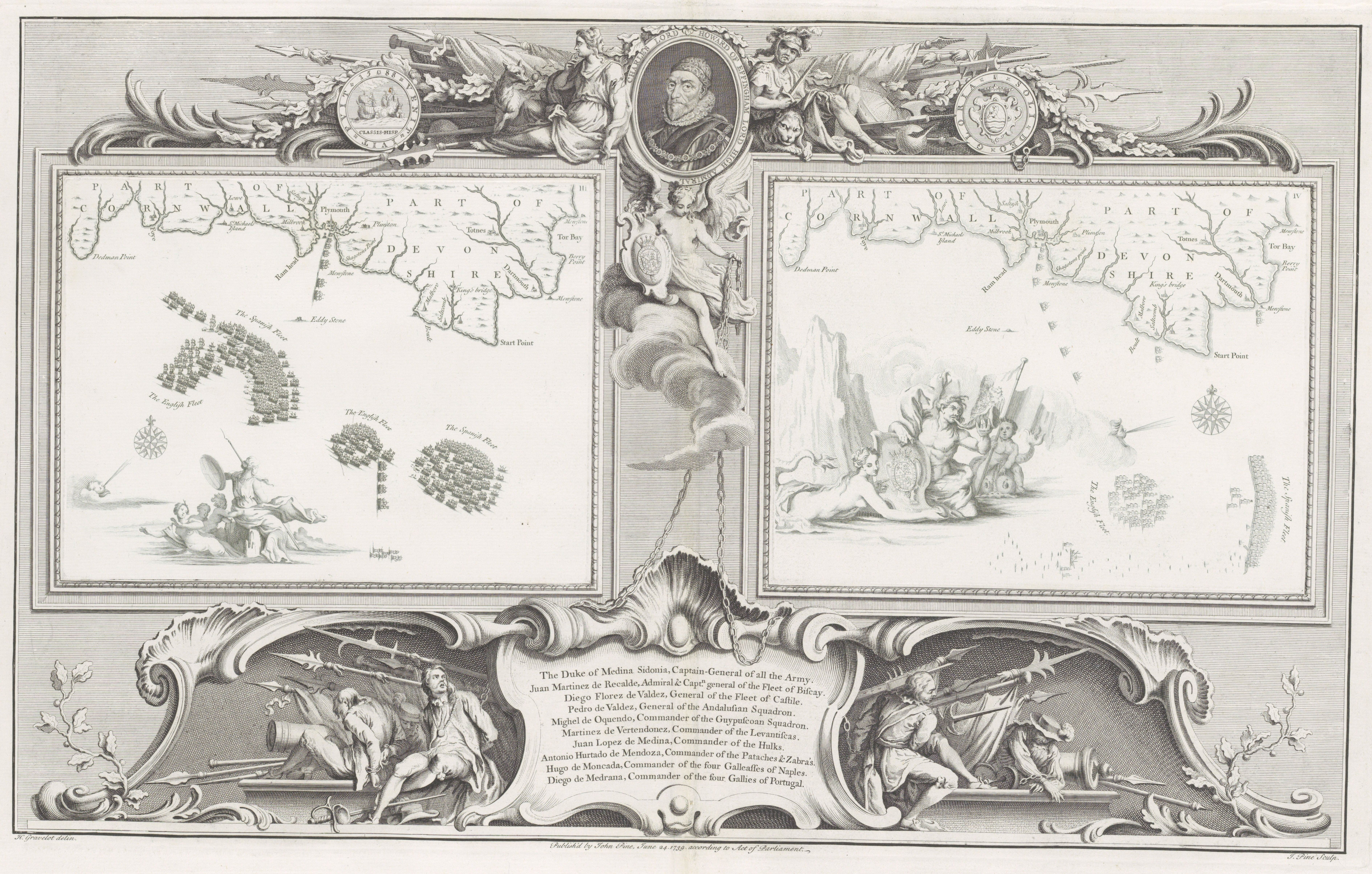
2 maps which inspired tapestries 3 & 4

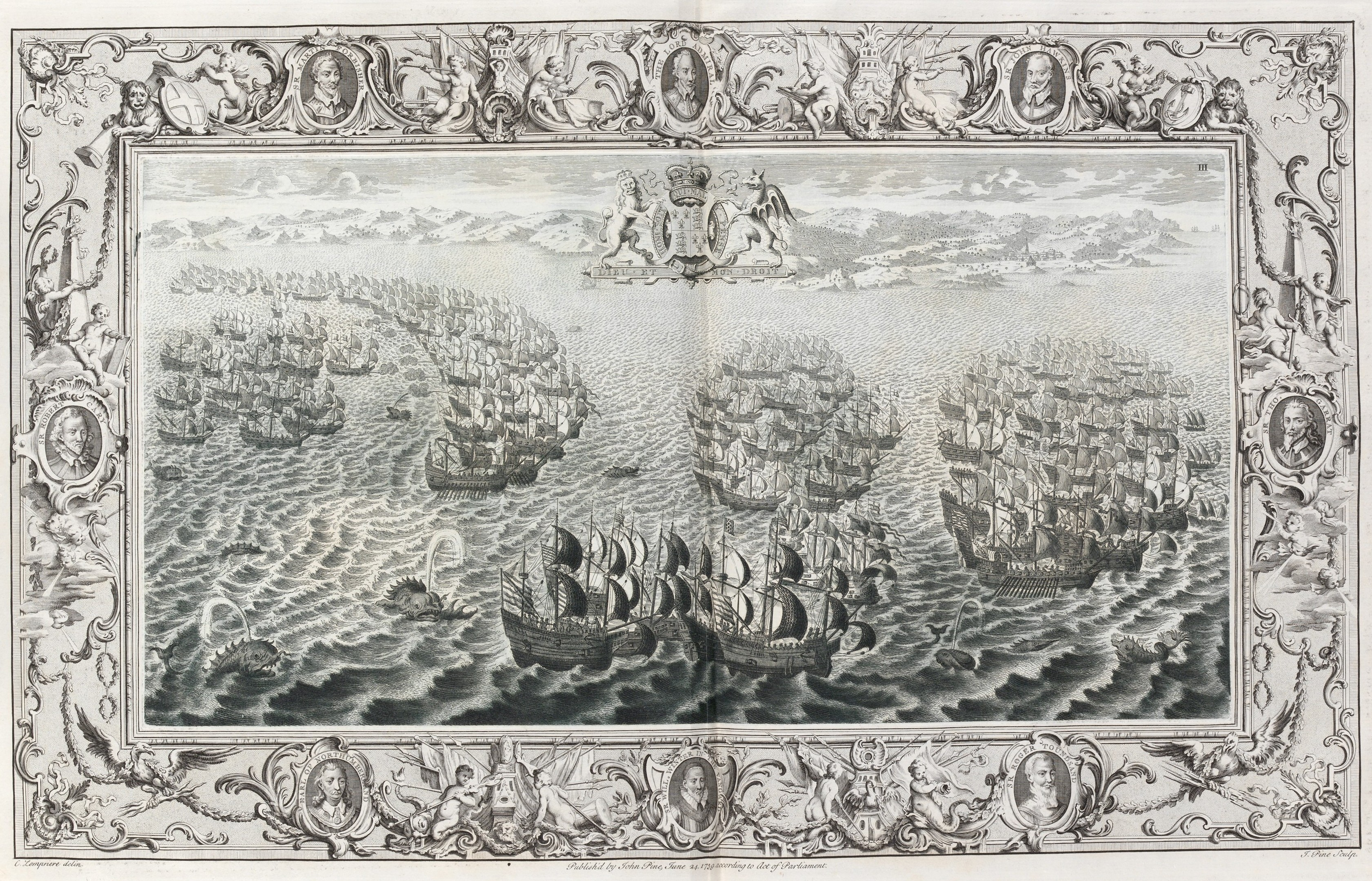
Tapestry 3

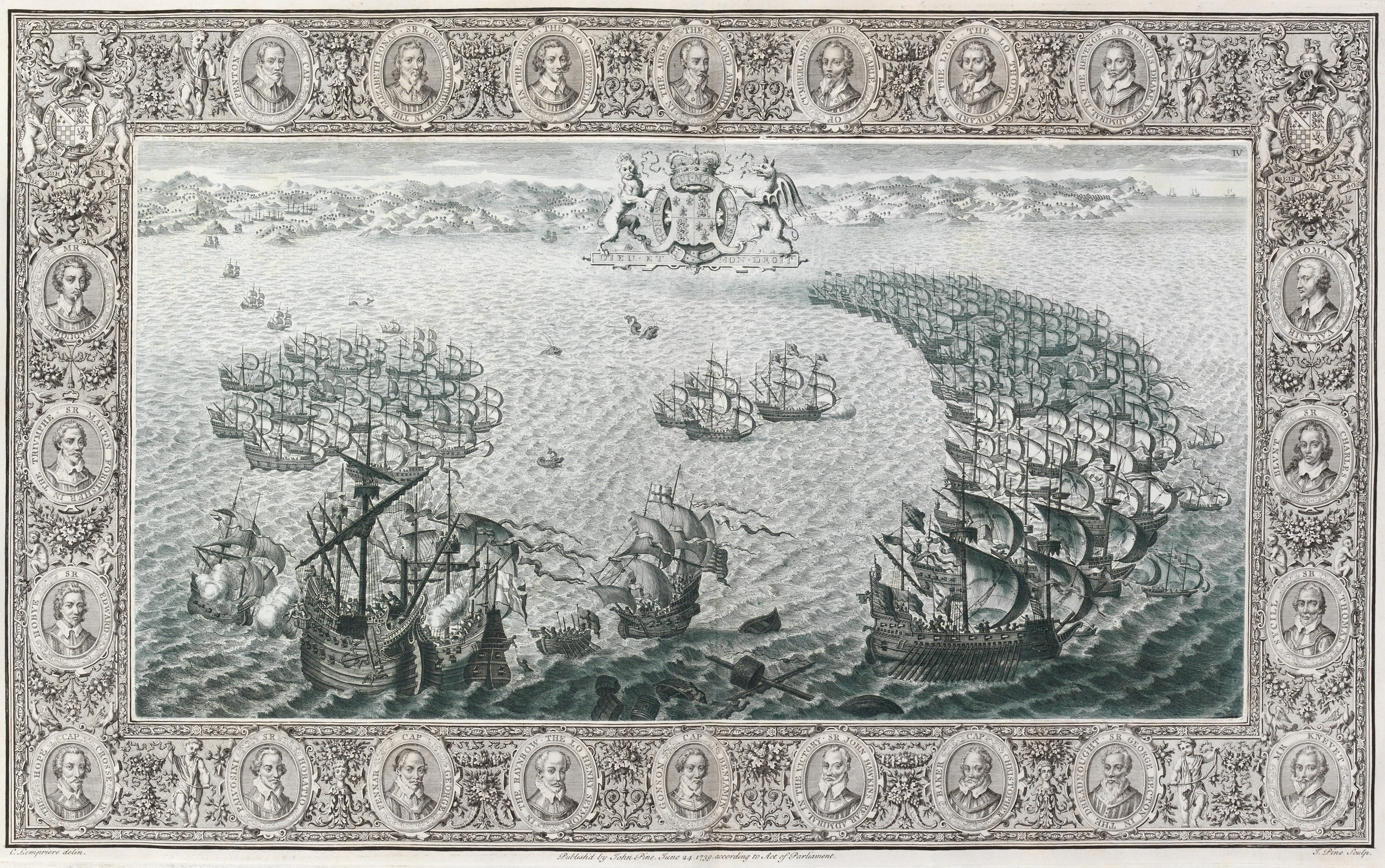
Tapestry 4

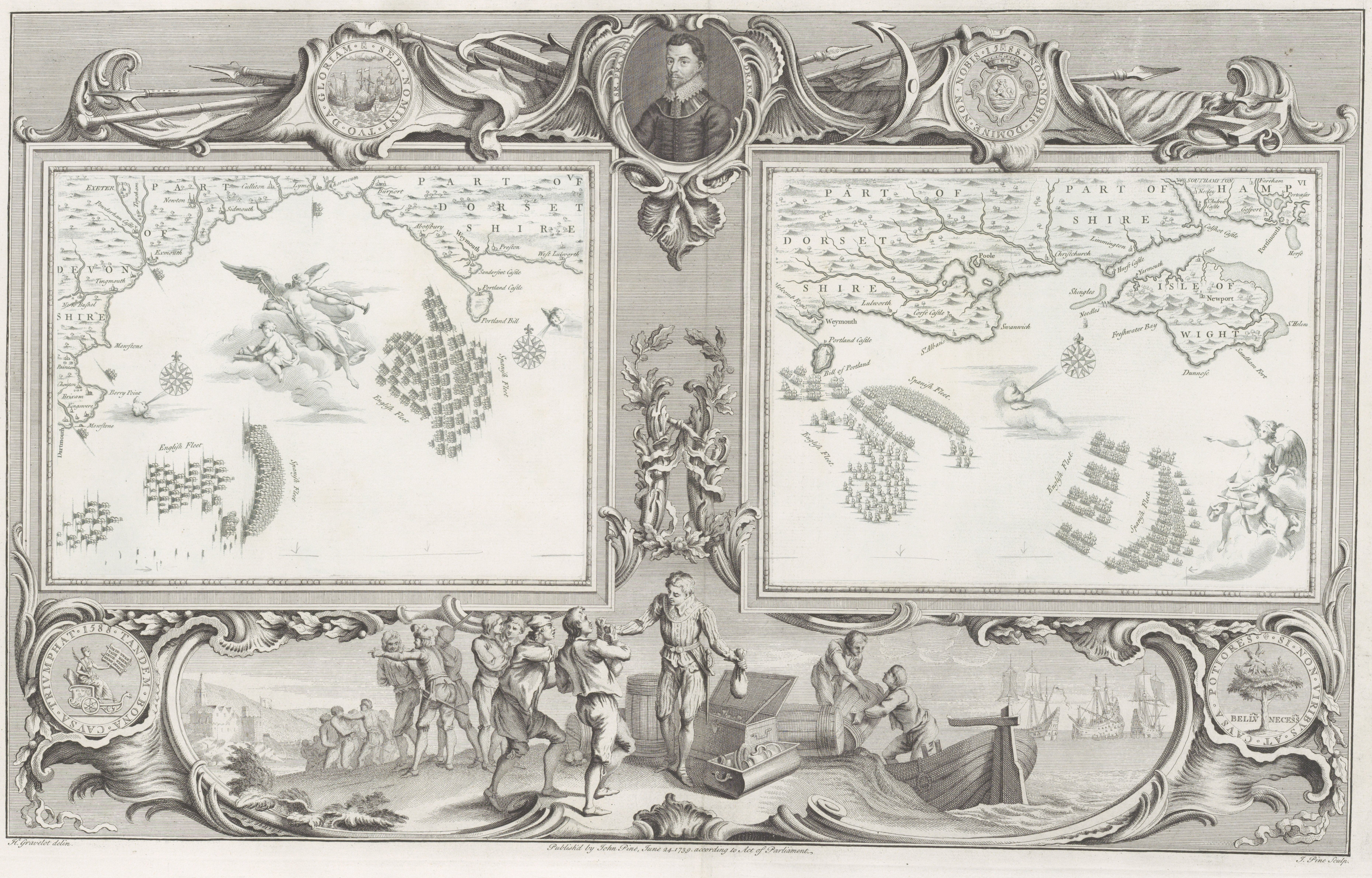
2 maps which inspired tapestries 5 & 6

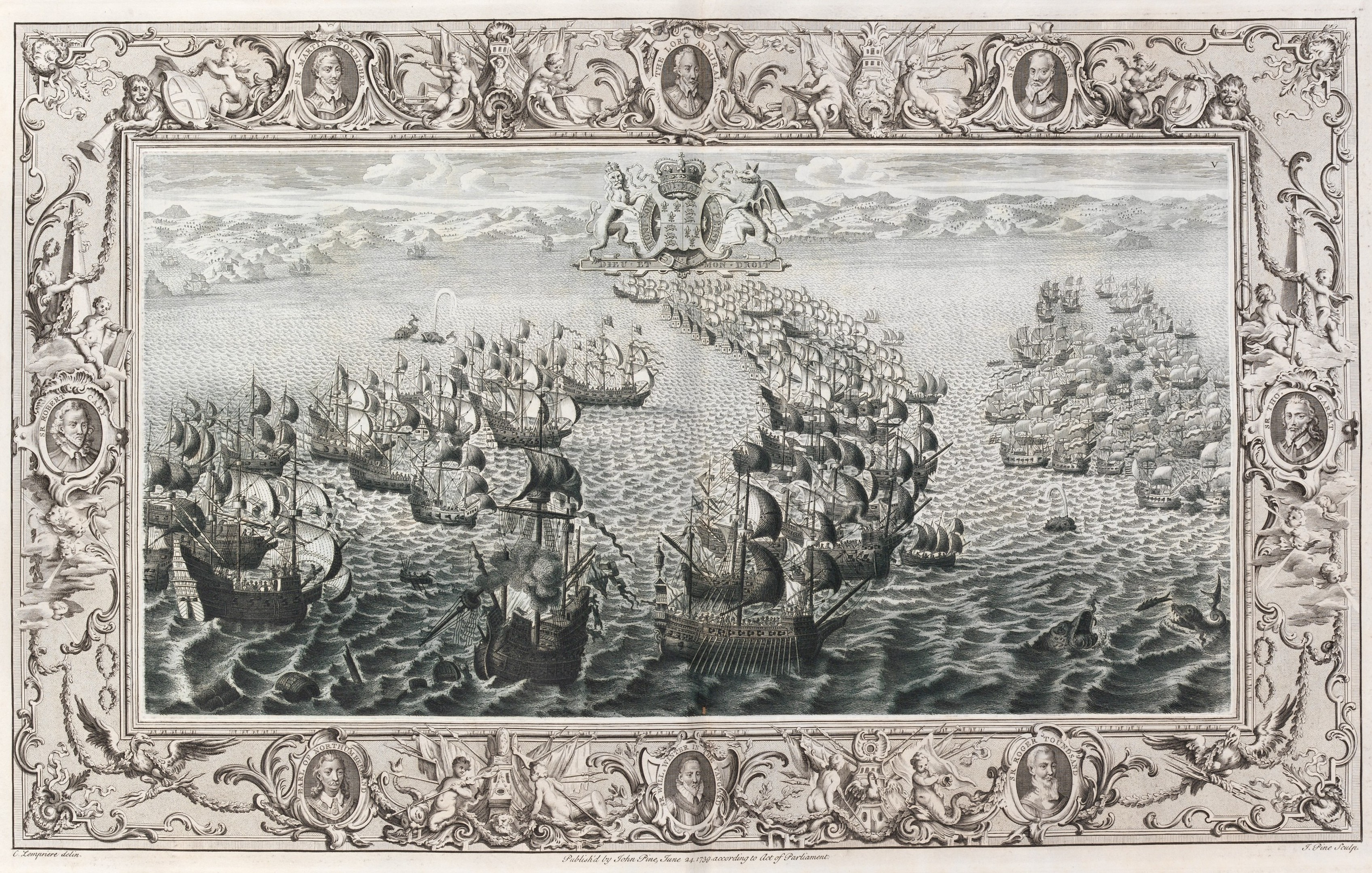
Tapestry 5

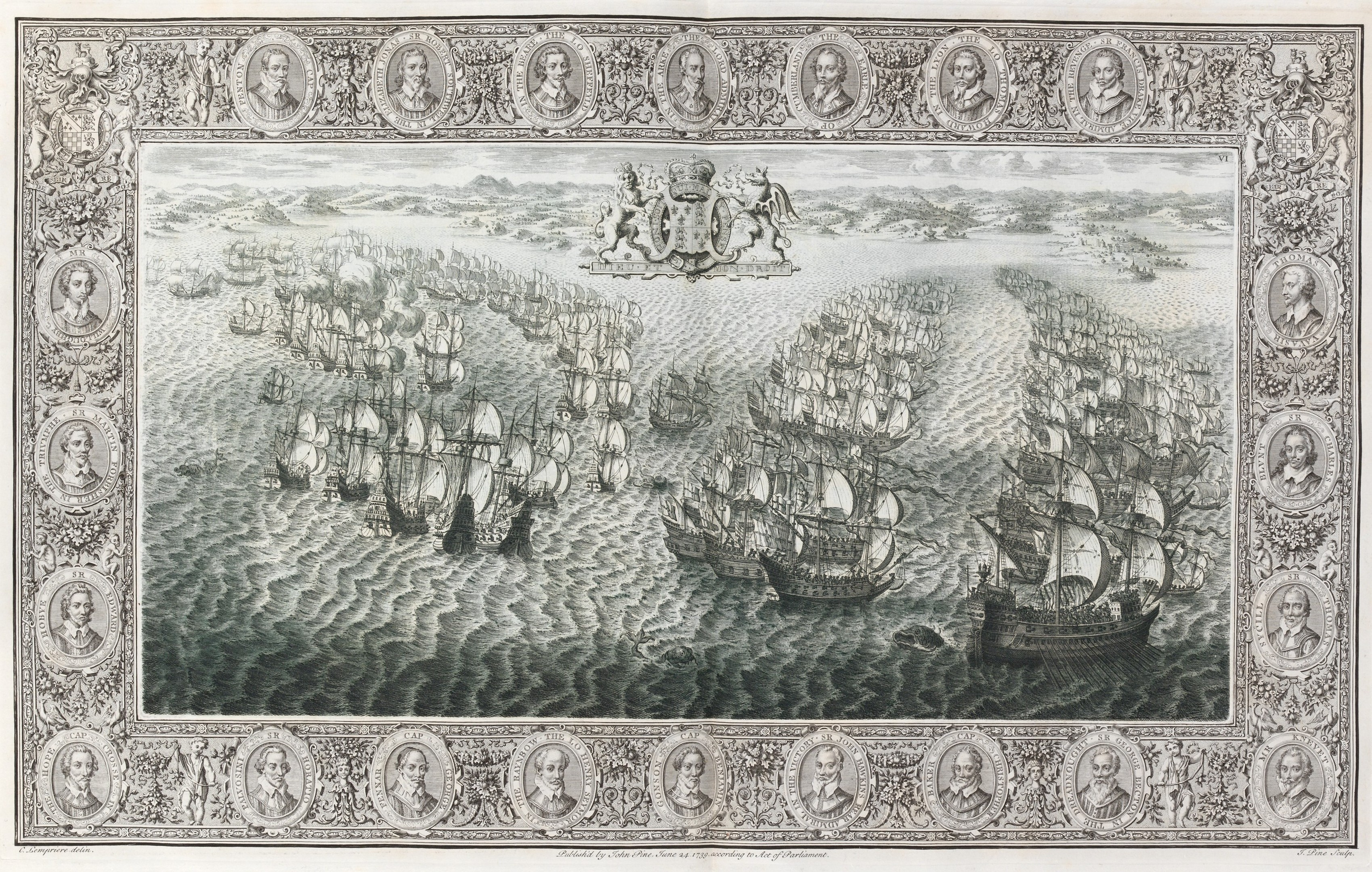
Tapestry 6

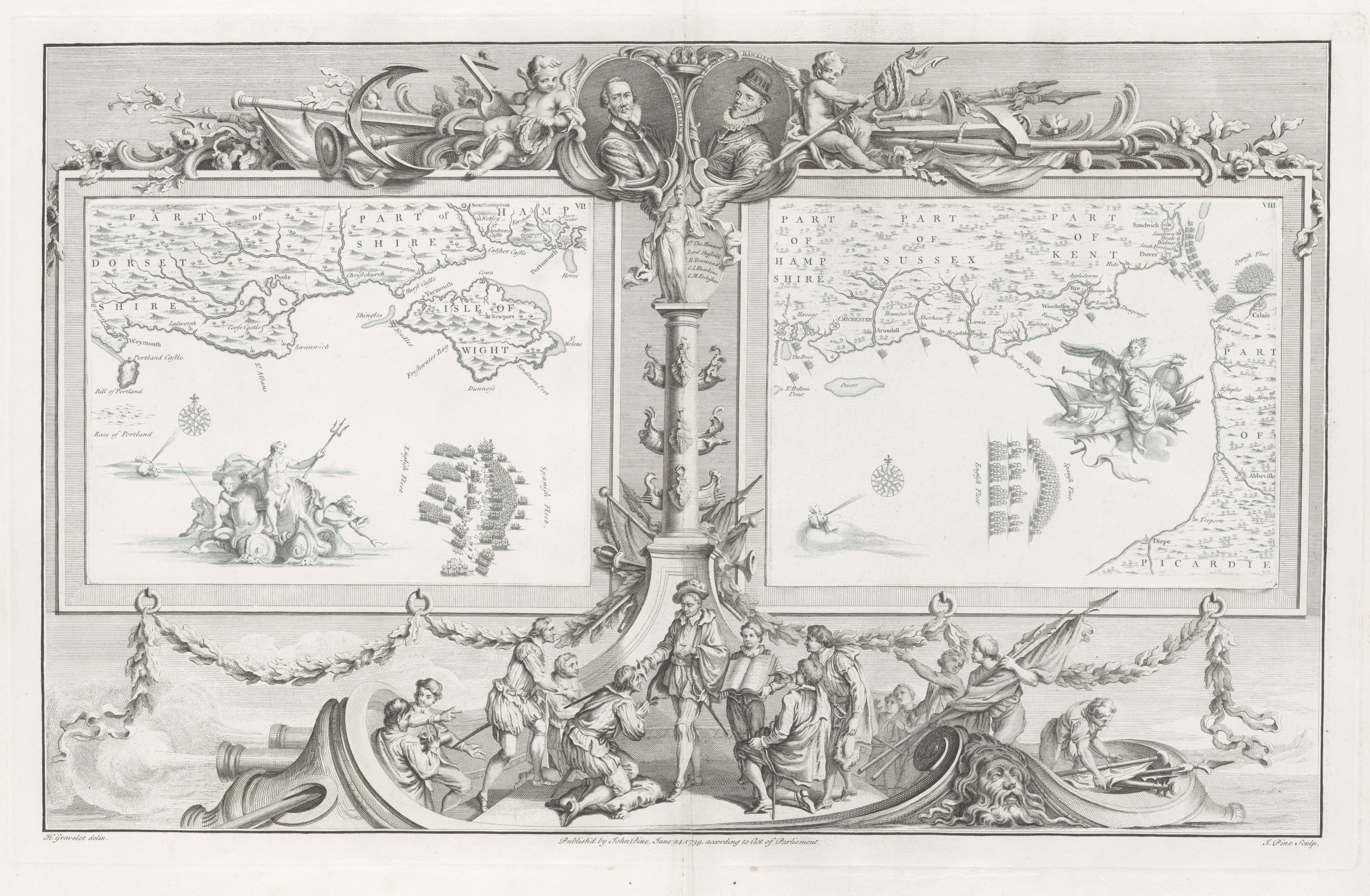
2 maps which inspired tapestries 7 & 8

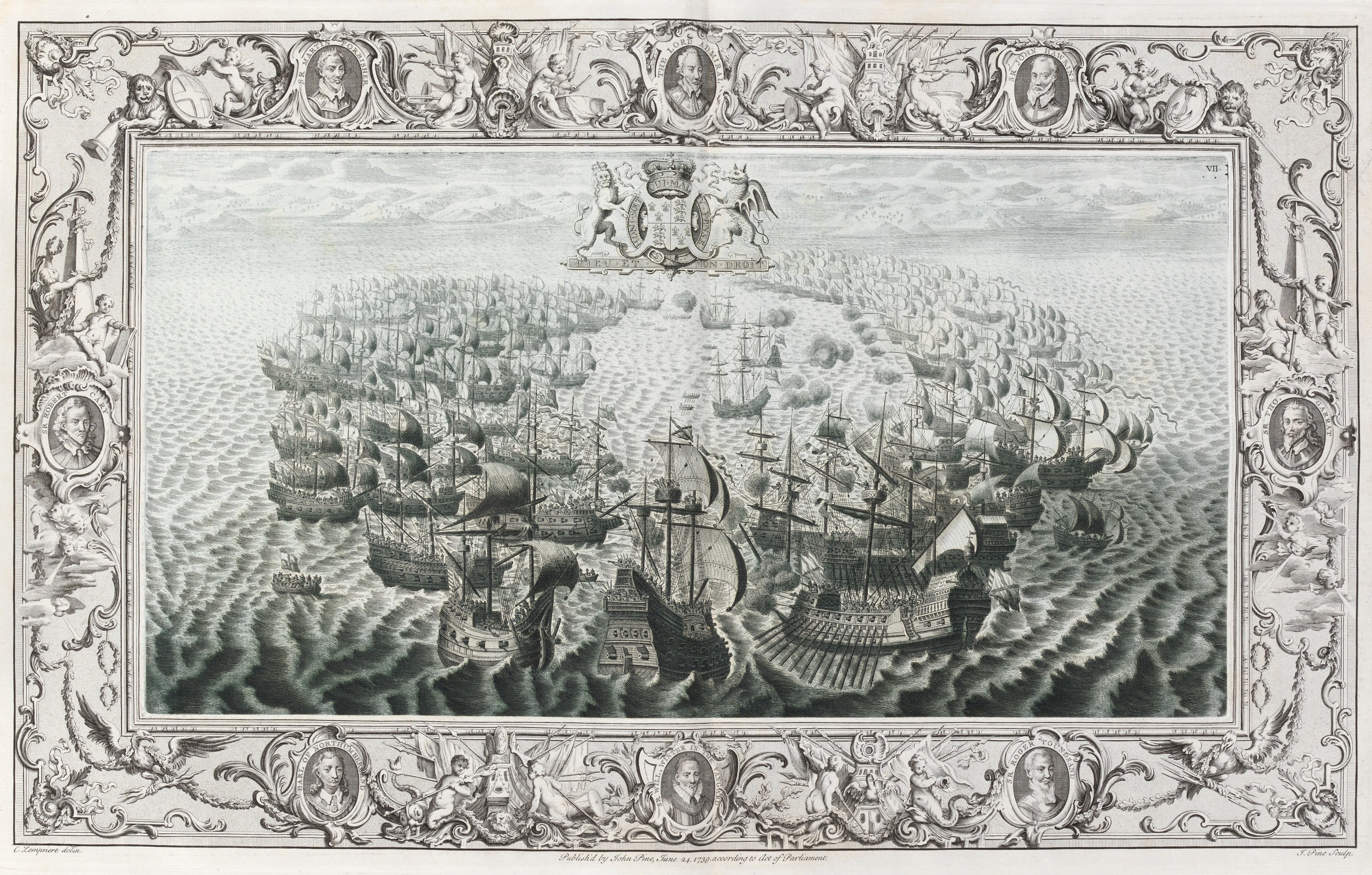
Tapestry 7

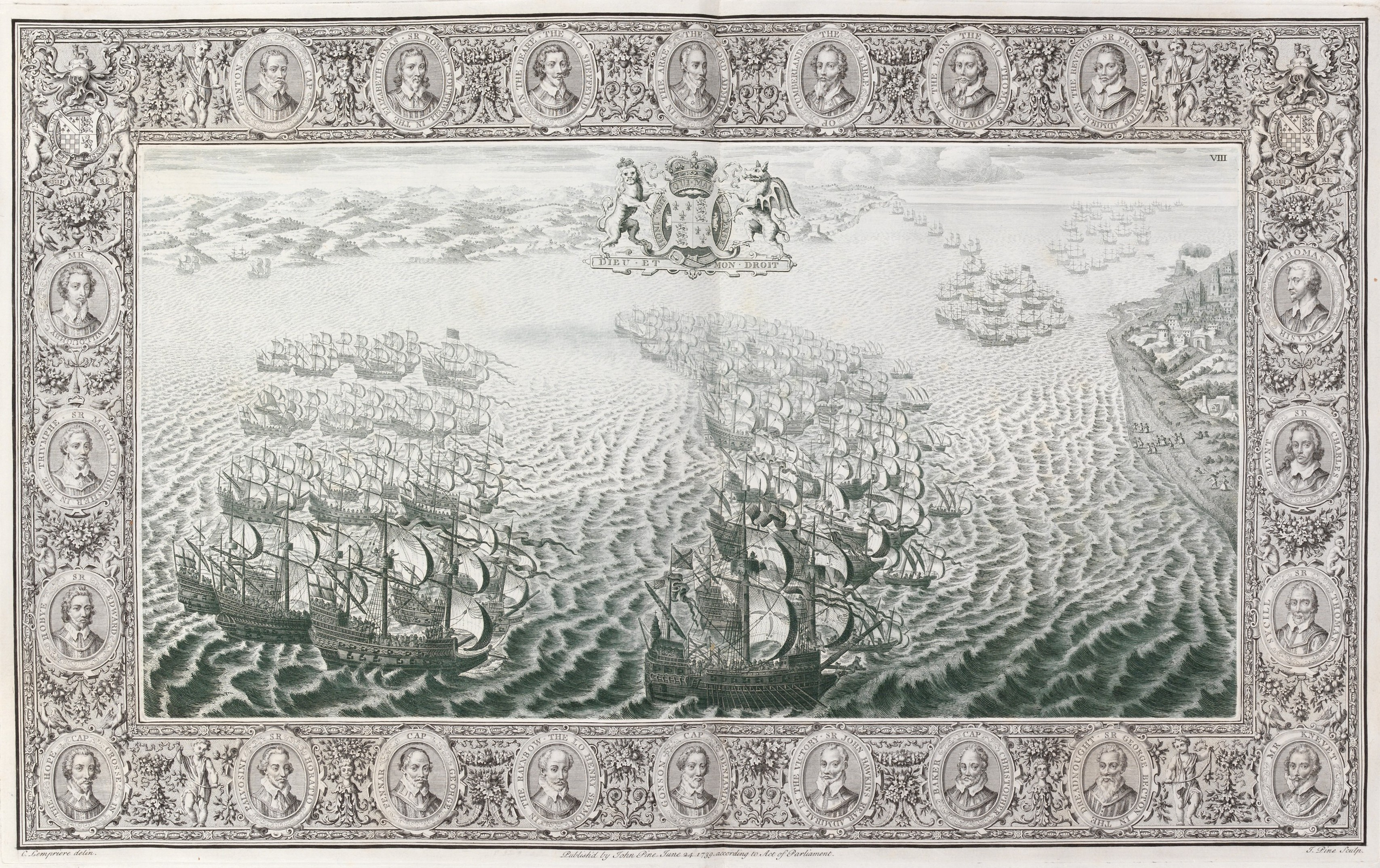
Tapestry 8

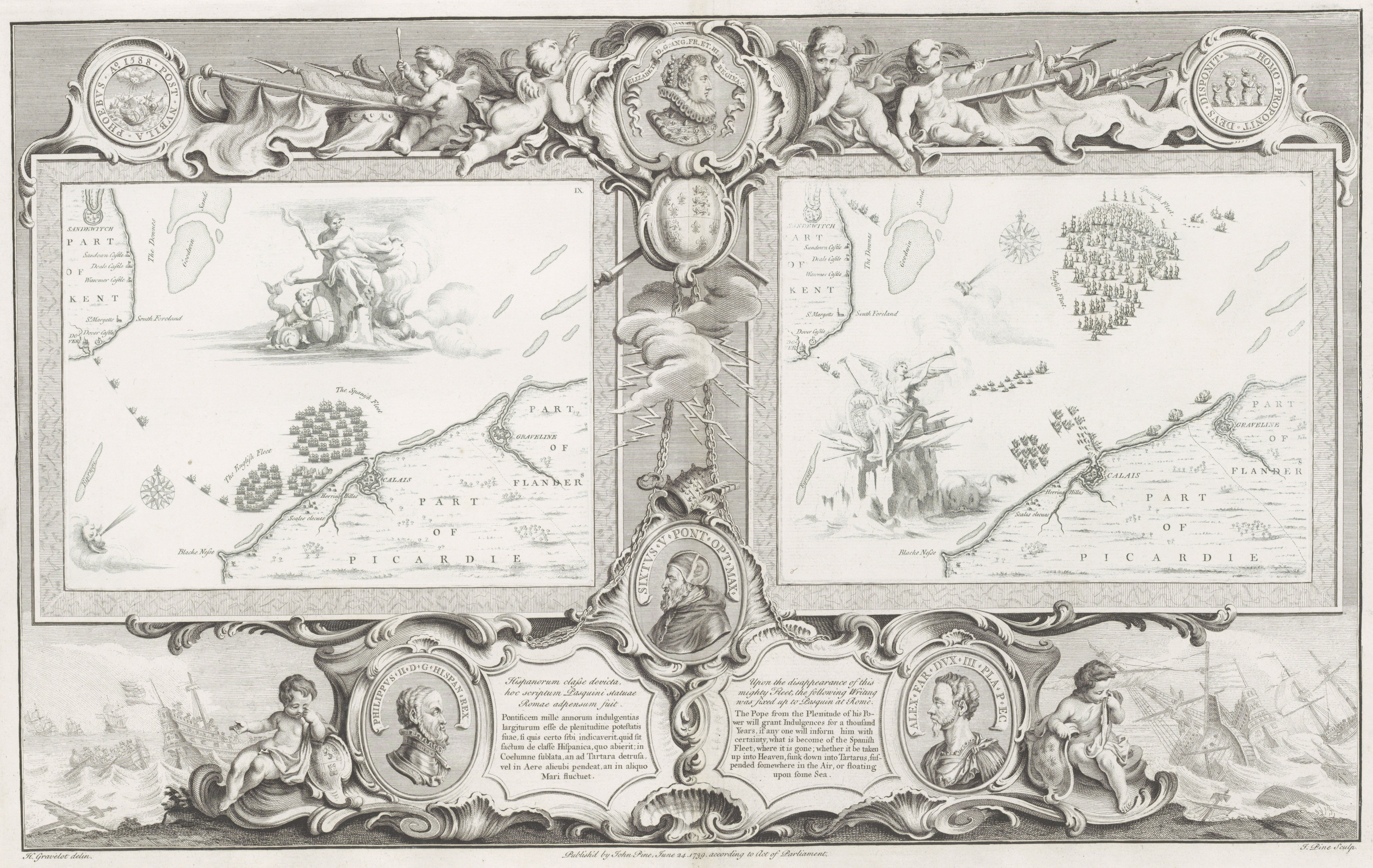
2 maps which inspired tapestries 9 & 10

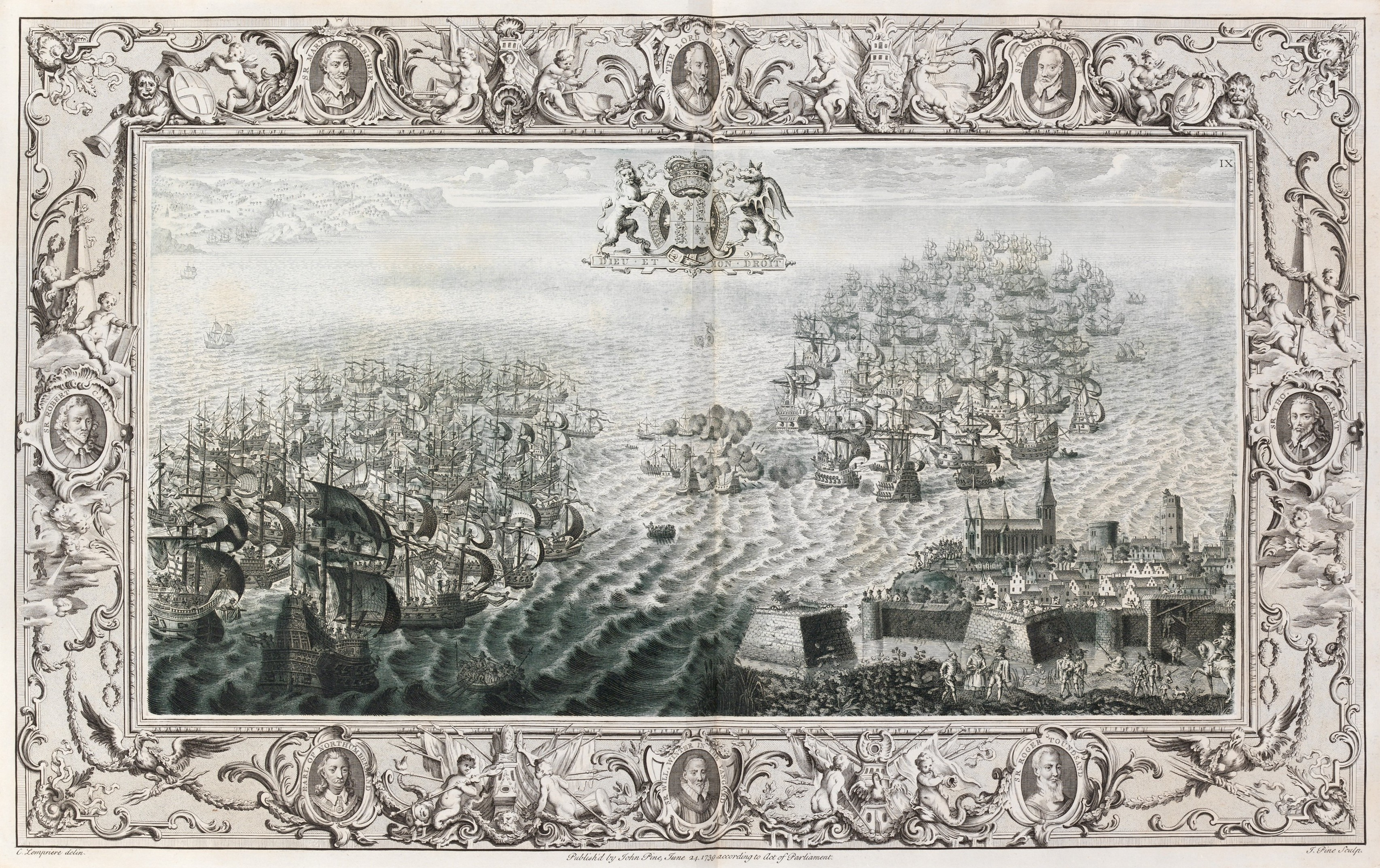
Tapestry 9

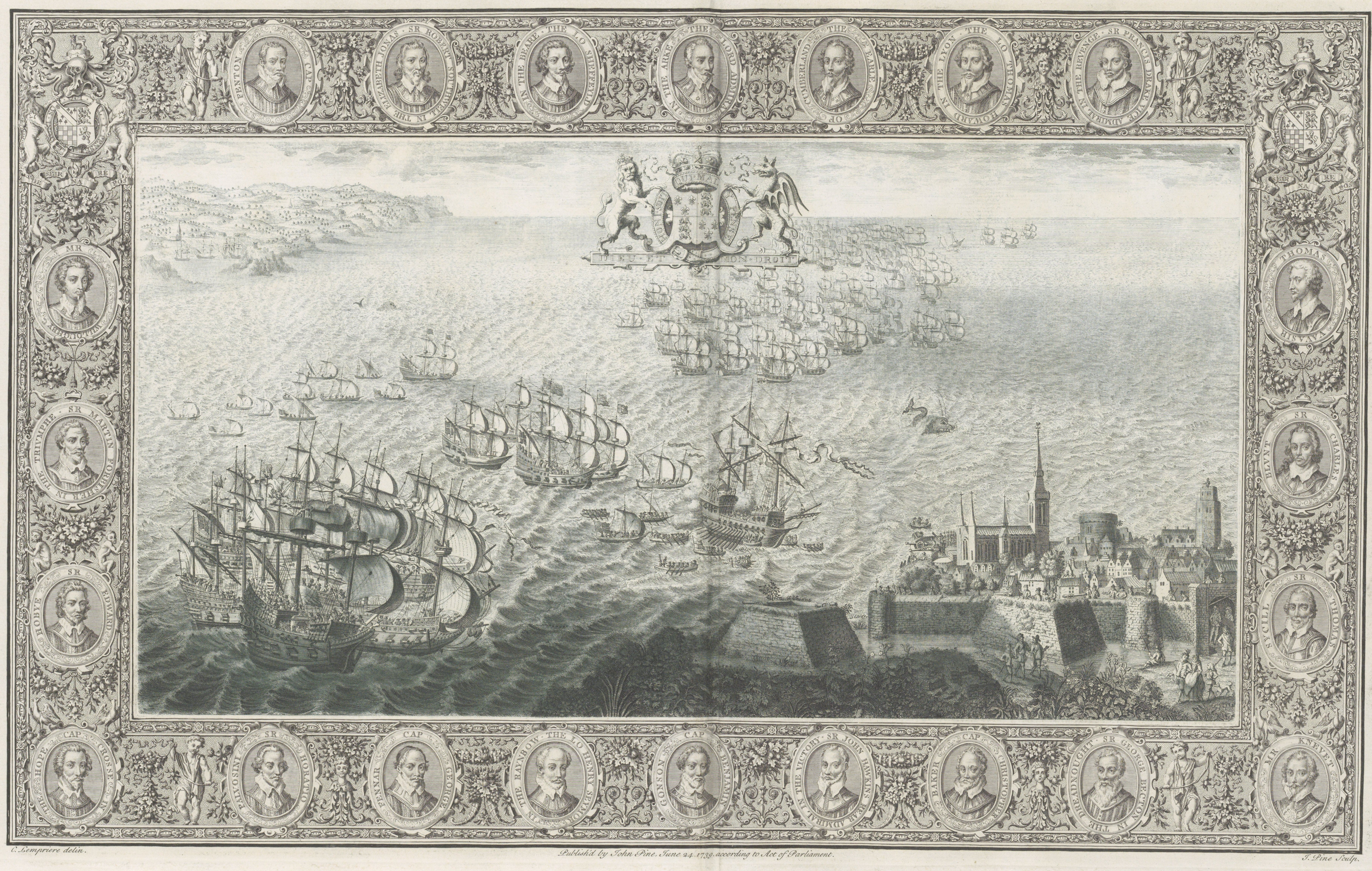
Tapestry 10
