= The Death of the Earl of Chatham =

Painting by John Singleton Copley

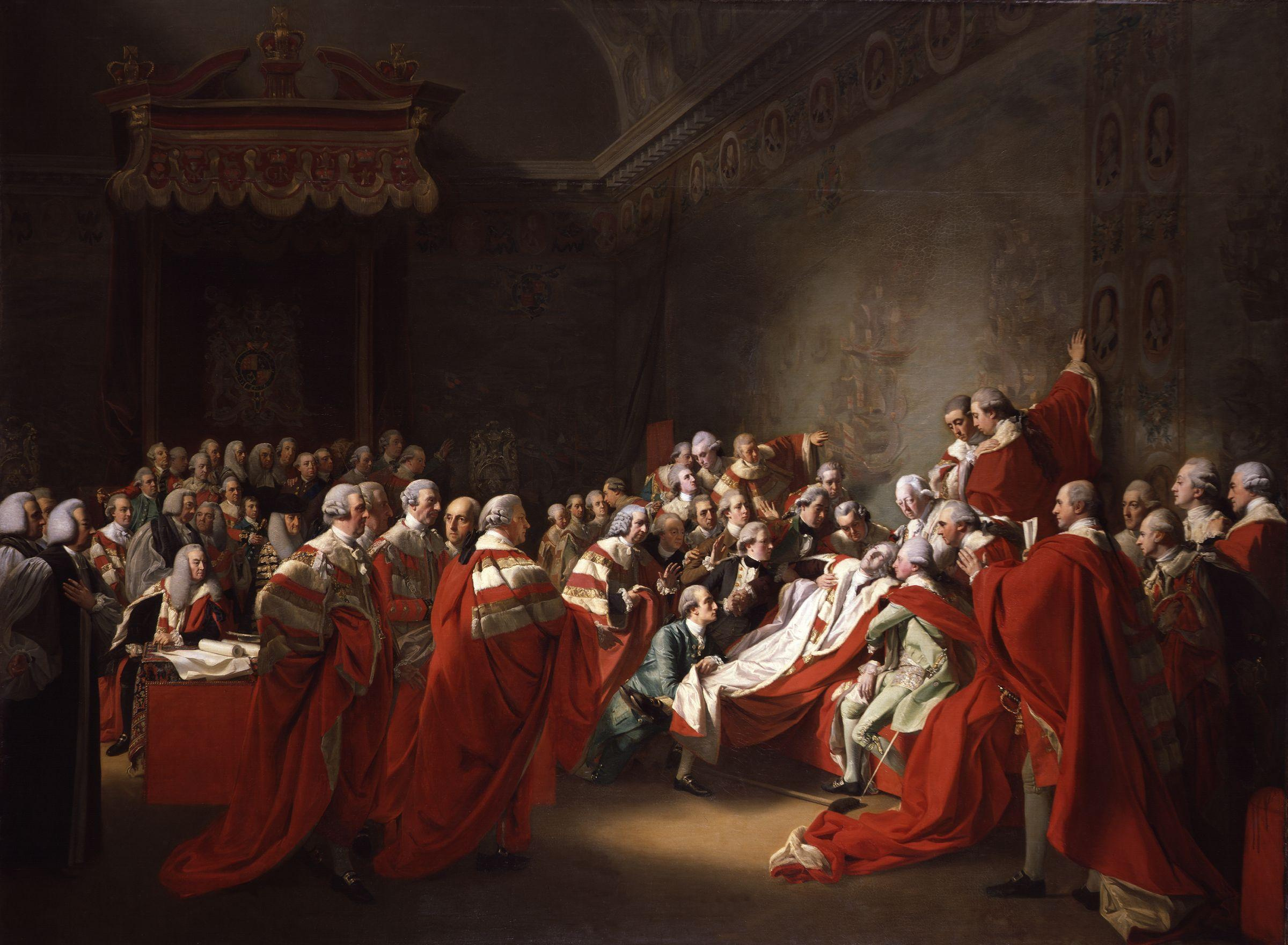
- Artist: John Singleton Copley
- Year: 1781
- Medium: Oil on canvas
- Dimensions: 228.5 cm × 307.5 cm (90.0 in × 121.1 in)
- Location: Tate Britain, London

The Death of the Earl of Chatham is a 1781 oil-on-canvas painting by Boston-born American artist John Singleton Copley. It depicts the collapse of William Pitt, 1st Earl of Chatham on 7 April 1778, during a debate in the House of Lords on the American War of Independence. Chatham is surrounded by peers of the realm, and the painting contains fifty-five portraits.

Copley's painting also serves as a visual record of the appearance of the Armada tapestries, which were destroyed in the 1834 Burning of Parliament.

The painting is as of July 2026 on display in Tate Britain.

== Background ==
Lord Chatham was the architect of the British victory in the Seven Years' War (1757–1763), in which Britain won supremacy in America. Although sympathetic to American grievances and against the use of force to subdue the Americans, he was opposed to American independence.

On 23 March 1778 the Duke of Richmond proposed in the Lords to withdraw all British troops from America. This was defeated by 56 votes to 28. On 5 April he sent Chatham a draft of the Address in which he argued for "entreating his Majesty to dismiss his Ministers, and withdraw his forces, by sea and land, from the revolted provinces...I am willing to hope that differences of opinion were more apparent than real, and arose only from want of opportunities to communicate and to explain." Chatham replied in third person: "It is an unspeakable concern to him, to find himself under so wide a difference with the Duke of Richmond, as between the sovereignty and allegiance of America, that he despairs of bringing about successfully any honourable issue".

Chatham was determined to answer Richmond's motion and so on 7 April he went to the House of Lords, swathed in flannels, supported by crutches and leaning on the arm of his 18-year-old son William Pitt the Younger. Lord Camden wrote to Lord Grafton, describing Chatham as:

...pale and emaciated. Within his large wig little more was to be seen than his aquiline nose, and his penetrating eye. He looked more like a dying man; yet never was seen a figure of more dignity; he appeared like a being of a superior species. Sensing the historic nature of the occasion, all the peers rose in their places.

Richmond in his speech said that as the Americans could not be defeated they were independent already and that recognising this fact was common sense. Lord Weymouth then spoke for the government. Chatham then rose in his place: "He took one hand from his crutch and raised it, casting his eyes towards heaven...He appeared to be extremely feeble and spoke with that difficulty of utterance which is the characteristic of severe indisposition". Chatham said:

My Lords, I rejoice that the grave has not closed upon me; that I am still alive to lift up my voice against the dismemberment of this ancient and most noble monarchy! Pressed down as I am by the hand of infirmity, I am little able to assist my country in this most perilous conjuncture; but, my Lords, while I have sense and memory, I will never consent to deprive the royal offspring of the House of Brunswick, the heirs of the Princess Sophia, of their fairest inheritance. Where is the man that will dare to advise such a measure? My Lords, his Majesty succeeded to an empire as great in extent as its reputation was unsullied. Shall we tarnish the lustre of this nation by an ignominious surrender of its rights and fairest possessions? Shall this great kingdom, that has survived, whole and entire, the Danish depredations, the Scottish inroads, and the Norman conquest; that has stood the threatened invasion of the Spanish Armada, now fall prostrate before the House of Bourbon? Surely, my Lords, this nation is no longer what it was! Shall a people, that seventeen years ago was the terror of the world, now stoop so low as to tell its ancient inveterate enemy, take all we have, only give us peace? It is impossible! ...My Lords, any state is better than despair. Let us at least make one effort; and if we must fall, let us fall like men!

After delivering this speech Chatham suddenly pressed his hand to his heart and fell back in a swoon. The Duke of Cumberland, Lord Temple and other peers, along with Chatham's younger son James Pitt, hastened to assist Chatham. Chatham was then "removed into the Prince's Chamber, and the medical assistance of Dr. Brocklesby, who happened to be in the House, was instantly procured". He was then carried to a house at Downing Street and later that day back to his home at Hayes, Kent. Chatham, aged 69, died there on 11 May.

Technically the title is a misnomer as his death did not take place until 34 days after the collapse portrayed and at home away from the Palace of Westminster.

== Painting ==
Copley positions Chatham beneath the tapestries depicting the defeat of the Spanish Armada made by Hendrick Cornelisz Vroom. Chatham's vision of the strength of the British Empire resting upon commercial expansion via the sea and his collapsing beneath the depiction of one of England's greatest naval victories are connected and symbolic.

Copley also shows Lord Mansfield, one of Chatham's enemies, seated in indifference.

== Reception ==
Copley rented out a private room to exhibit the painting, charging for admission. He also made money from the painting from prints of it, marketed by John Boydell.
