= Gerard van Bylaer =

- Born: 1553; Barneveld, Duchy of Guelders
- Died: 1617 (aged 63–64); Dordrecht, Dutch Republic

Gerard van Bylaer (1553–1617) was a Dutch medallist active in Dordrecht, Middelburg and Harderwijk.

Van Bylaer was born in Barneveld to a family of printers. His brother Wolfaert became a jeweler in Amsterdam and he settled in Dordrecht as a medallist. His sons Jacob and Willem followed in his footsteps as medallists and Willem later became mint master in Dordrecht. He is known for his jetons and medals commemorating various national events of his time.

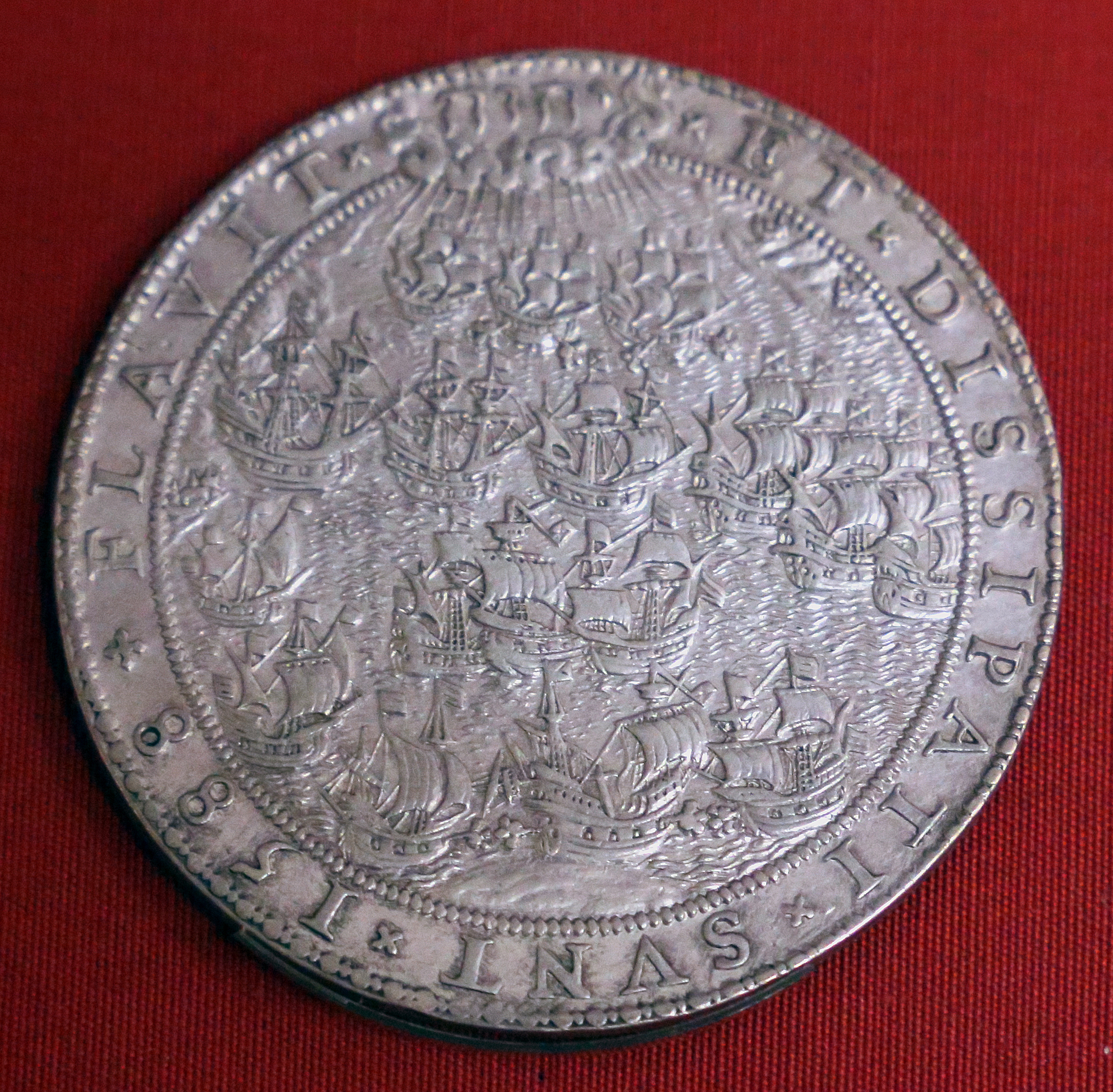
1588 medal stamped by the Middelburg, Zeeland mint to honor God and Maurice of Orange for delivering the United Provinces from the Spanish Armada.

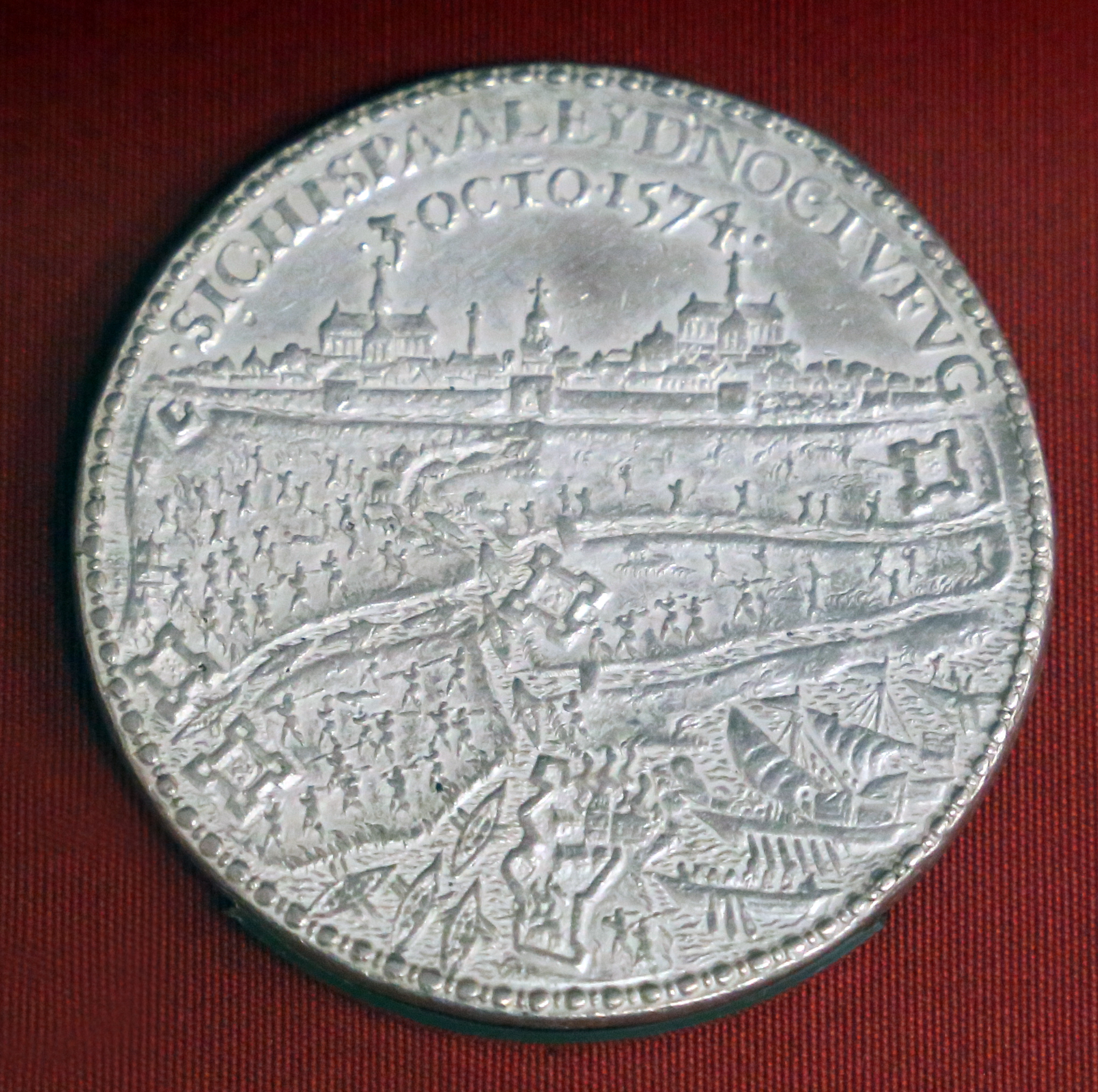
1574 medal commemorating the Siege of Leiden

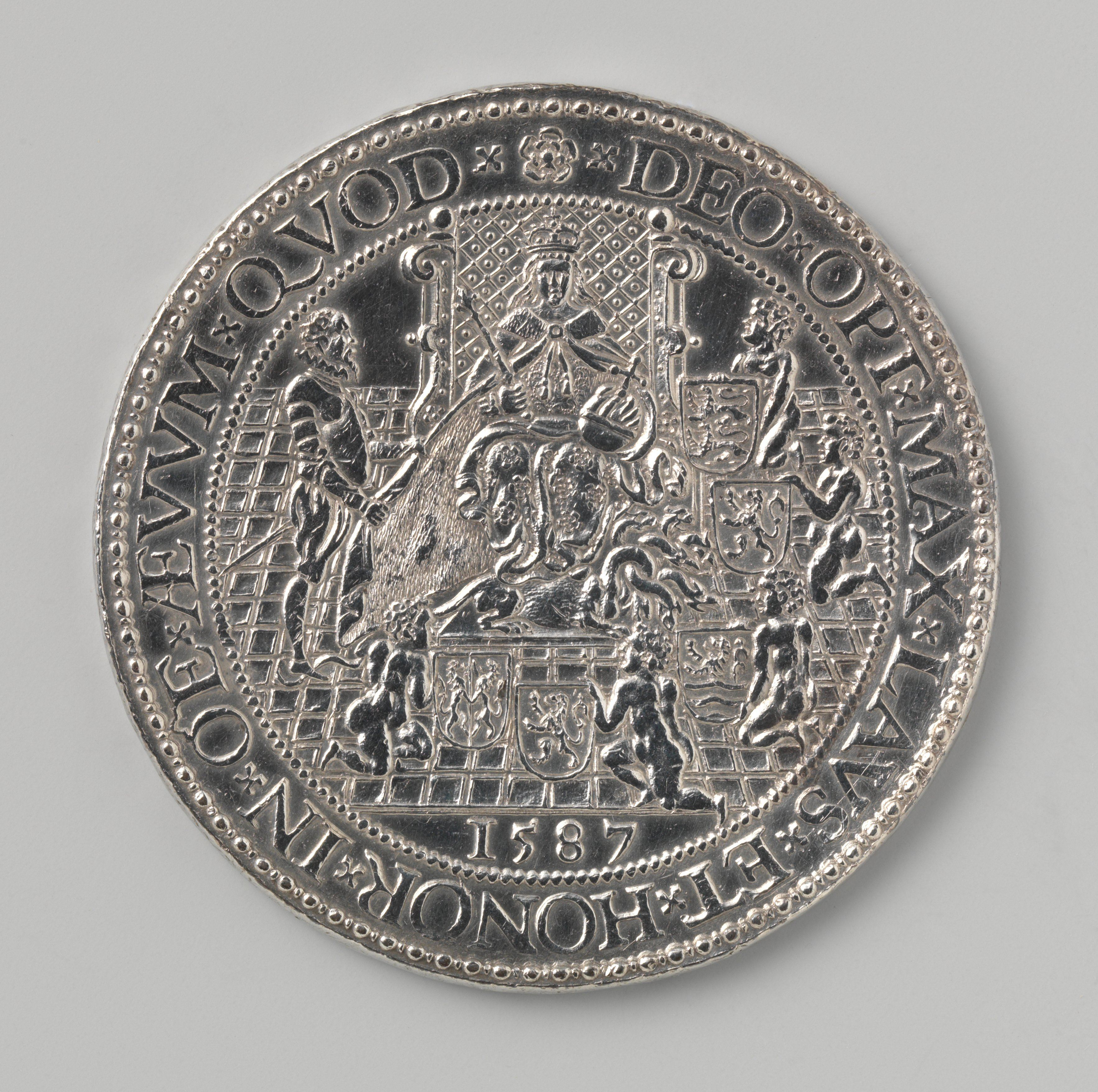
1587 medal commemorating Elizabeth I holding scepter and orb, trampling a hydra, with Robert Dudley, 1st Earl of Leicester, the Governor-General of the United Provinces, to her right. Five cherubs hold the arms of the United Provinces

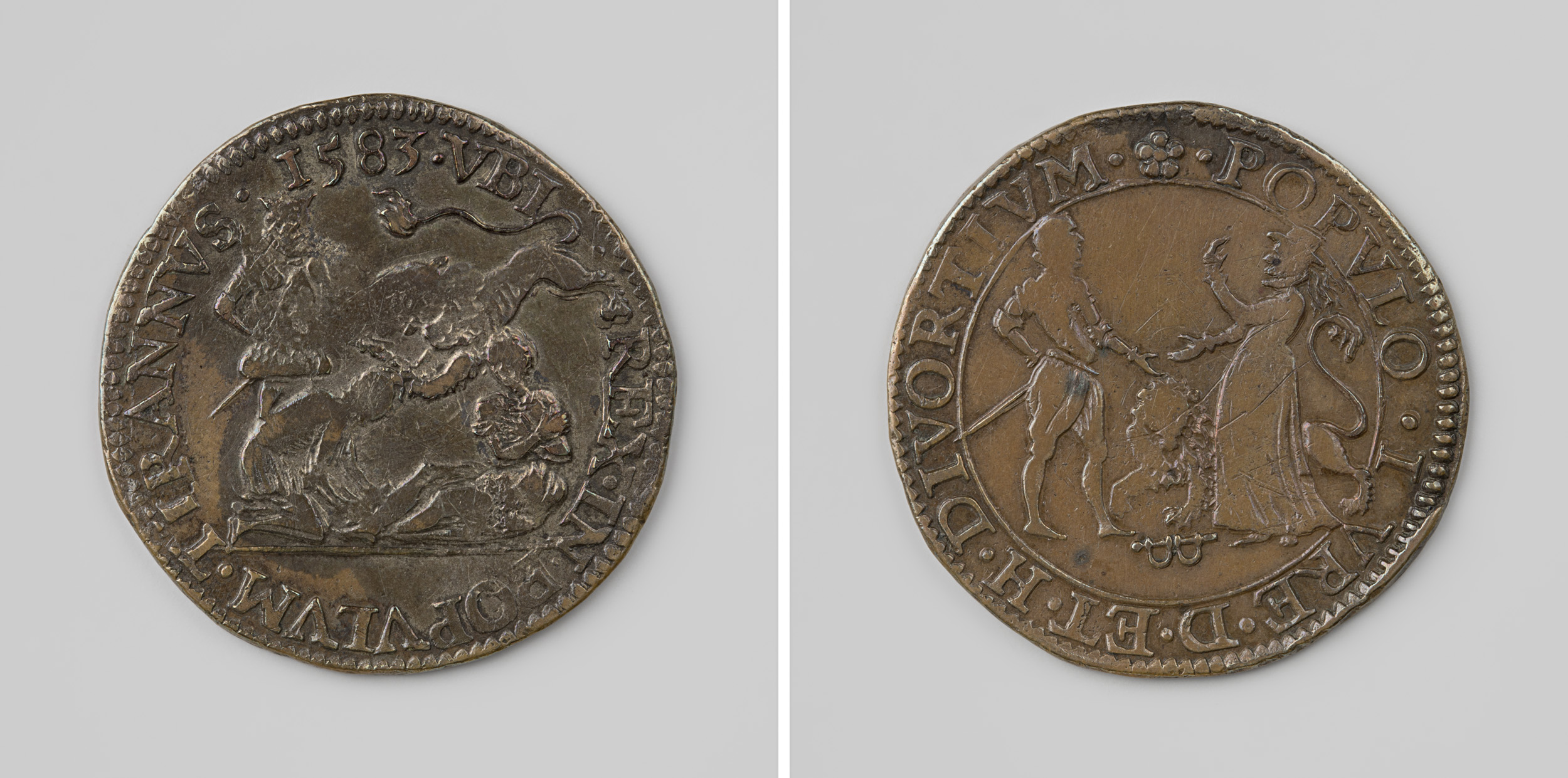
1583 Jeton commemorating the rejection of Filips II as leader of the Netherlands

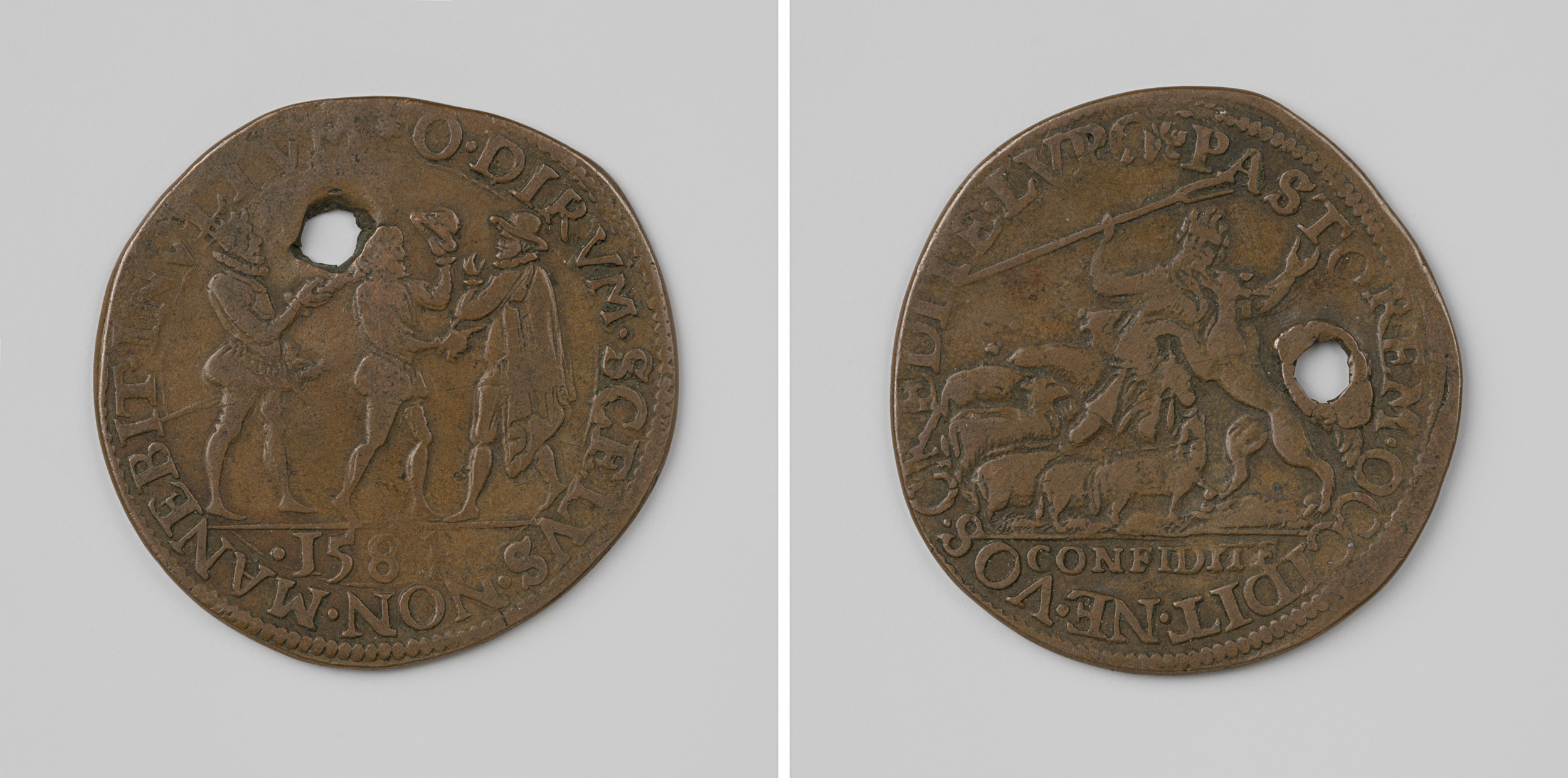
1584 Jeton (with punched holes) commemorating the murder of William the Silent
