= Clement Lemprière =

British painter

Clement Lemprière (1683–1746) was an artist, military draughtsman and cartographer.

== Life ==
The eldest son of Thomas Lempriere and Joan or Jeanne Beach, he was born in St Helier on Jersey and baptised in the Town Church on 18 January 1683. He was a captain, though it is unclear if this was a military, naval or merchant naval rank – his obituary in the Gentlemen's Magazine called him "captain of a marching regiment", but Thieme calls him "by profession a ship's captain". He made sketches in Scotland, Portugal, Bermuda and the Balearics, which were posthumously published.

In 1725 he created an official map of roads in the Scottish Highlands. In 1727 he was made a draughtsman to the Ordnance Office's Civil Branch, with an annual salary of £100 and an office in the Tower of London - he held that post until his death and his pupils included Leonard Smelt. He also published engravings after his own paintings of warships and a map of Bermuda. His portrait was engraved by John Faber the Younger after William Fry.

== Works ==
- A new and accurate map of Jersey, 1755, published posthumously
- A General and Particular Prospectus of the Islands of Jersey, Guernsey, Alderney, Serc, Arm and Jethou.
