= Stenella canavaliae =

Scientific classification
- Kingdom: Fungi
- Division: Ascomycota
- Class: Dothideomycetes
- Order: Capnodiales
- Family: Teratosphaeriaceae
- Genus: Stenella
- Species: S. canavaliae

Binomial name
- Stenella canavaliae Deighton

Species of fungus

Stenella canavaliae or Stenella canavaliae-roseae, formerly known as Cercospora canavaliae is a species of anamorphic fungus. It causes the brown leaf mould of Canavalia species.

== Description ==
Belonging to the Stenella genus, this species is a Cercospora-like fungus with a superficial secondary mycelium, solitary conidiophores, conidiogenous cells with thickened and darkened conidiogenous loci and catenate or single conidia with dark, slightly thickened hila.

== Distribution ==
It is found in tropical Asia, Africa and America, on Canavalia ensiformis and Canavalia rosea, and in South America on Canavalia plagiosperma.
