= Flora of the Cocos (Keeling) Islands =

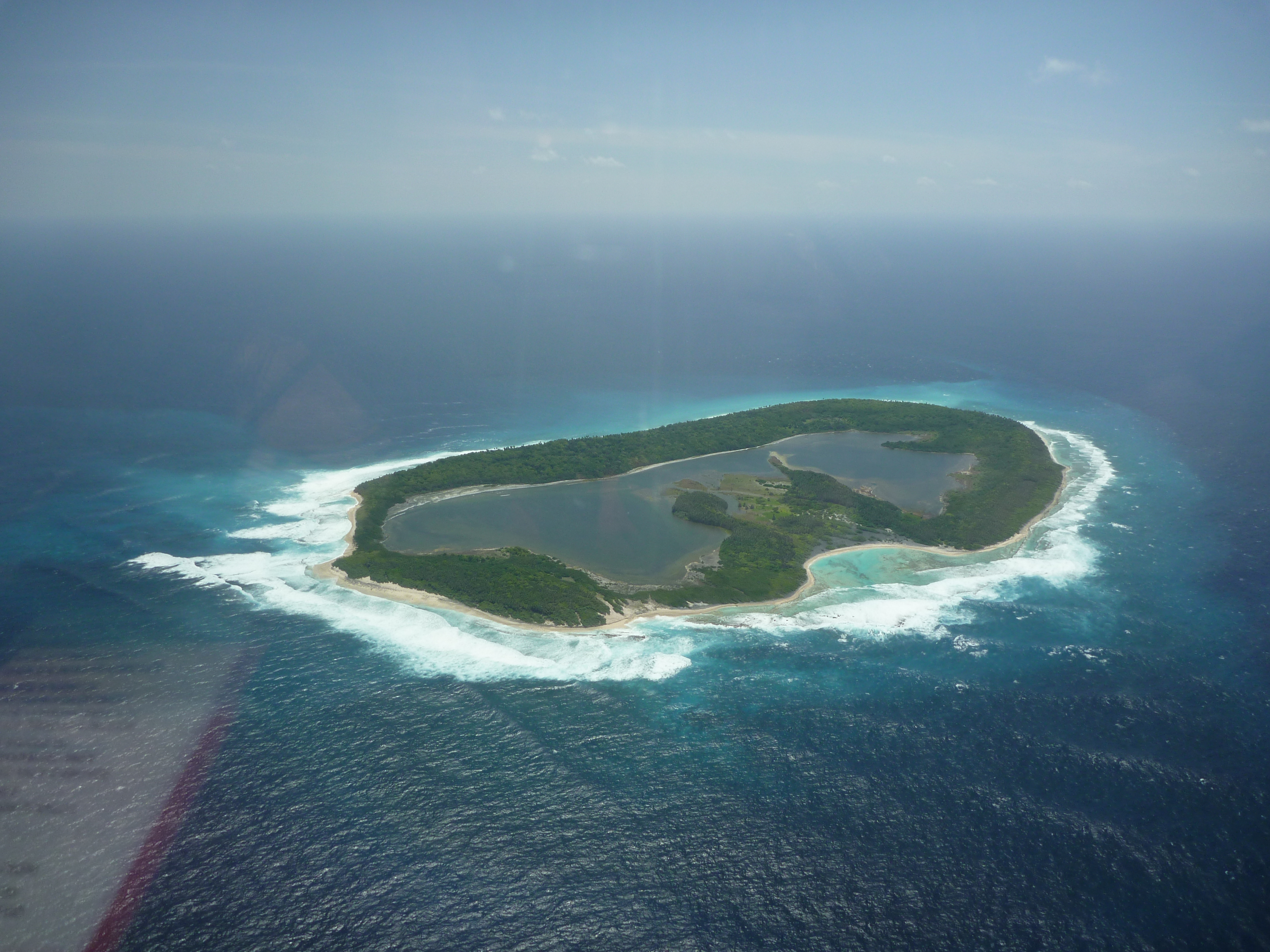
North Keeling, a national park

The vascular plant flora of the Cocos (Keeling) Islands consists of approximately 61 species native to the 22 vegetated islands and about 69 introduced species, most of which are confined to the two larger inhabited islands, Home Island and West Island. There are no plant species endemic to the islands; however, one variety of Pandanus tectorius, P. tectorius var. cocosensis, is only found growing on these islands. The native vegetation of the two atolls primarily consists of sea-dispersed shoreline plants of the Indo-Pacific region. On the lagoon shoreline, tall shrublands are dominated by Pemphis acidula and Cordia subcordata, often growing in monospecific stands. Closed forest stands are dominated by either Cocos nucifera or Pisonia grandis.

Much of the area of the southern islands has been modified for coconut plantations, altering the vegetation from the pre-settlement era. North Keeling, about 25 kilometres (16 mi) to the north, has been protected as part of the Pulu Keeling National Park, where 31 plants can be found, of which six are introduced. About half of the species on the southern atoll are introduced.

In a report to Parks Australia in 2002, of the many introduced species on the southern atoll, Chromolaena odorata (Siam weed) was identified as being the greatest threat to the environment. Most of the introduced species are pantropical herbaceous plants likely introduced to the southern atoll after the airfield was built in 1944.

== History ==
The Cocos (Keeling) Islands are isolated, being the only atolls in the eastern Indian Ocean, and were uninhabited until relatively recently in the early 19th century. The first botanical study was done while naturalist Charles Darwin visited the southern atoll for ten days, arriving April 1, 1836. Darwin collected 21 species during his time on the islands.

In such a loose, dry, stony soil, nothing but the climate of the intertropical regions could produce a vigorous vegetation. Besides the Cocoa nut which is so numerous as at first to appear the only tree, there are five or six other kinds. One called the Cabbage tree, grows to a great bulk in proportion to its height, & has an irregular figure; its wood being very soft. Besides these trees the number of native plants is exceedingly limited; I suppose it does not exceed a dozen. Yet the woods, from the dead branches of the trees, & the arms of the Cocoa nuts is a thick jungle.

— Charles Darwin, HMS Beagle diary

Later, the Scottish botanist Henry Ogg Forbes botanised the southern islands in 1879, collecting 38 species in 22 days, followed by W. E. Birch in 1885 and the British botanist Henry B. Guppy, who spent ten weeks in 1888 on both atolls. By far the longest visit by a naturalist was that of Frederic Wood Jones who spent 15 months on the southern atoll in 1909 and published his account in the book, Coral and Atolls. A History and Description of the Keeling-Cocos Islands, with an account of their Fauna and Flora, and a Discussion of the Method of Development and Transformation of Coral Structures in General, published in 1912. The northern atoll was visited in 1941 by the British naturalist Carl Alexander Gibson-Hill, who provided the first systematic assessment of the plant communities and a description of the dominant flora. The 1980s saw the two largest surveys in 1985 by I. R. Telford, who collected 93 species from both atolls, and in 1986-1987 by D. G. Williams, who collected 130 from all islands.

== Species ==
Species	Family	Vernacular name	Local name	Status	Image
Dicliptera ciliata	Acanthaceae			native	
Sesuvium portulacastrum	Aizoaceae	sea purslane		native	
Achyranthes aspera var. villosior	Amaranthaceae	chaff flower		native	
Aerva lanata	Amaranthaceae			introduced	
Crinum asiaticum	Amaryllidaceae	crinum lily		native	
Zephyranthes rosea	Amaryllidaceae			introduced	
Ochrosia oppositifolia	Apocynaceae		Kayu Laki	native	
Cocos nucifera	Arecaceae	coconut	Kelapa	native	
Austroeupatorium inulaefolium	Asteraceae	stinkweed		introduced	
Chromolaena odorata	Asteraceae	Siam weed		introduced	
Cyanthillium cinereum	Asteraceae			introduced	
Eleutheranthera ruderalis	Asteraceae			introduced	
Emilia sonchifolia	Asteraceae			introduced	
Erigeron bonariensis	Asteraceae	fleabane		introduced	
Sonchus oleraceus	Asteraceae	milk thistle		introduced	
Synedrella nodiflora	Asteraceae			introduced	
Tridax procumbens	Asteraceae			introduced	
Wollastonia biflora	Asteraceae	beach sunflower		native	
Argusia argentea	Boraginaceae	octopus bush	Kayu Sireh	native	
Cordia subcordata	Boraginaceae	sea trumpet	Geronggang	native	
Lepidium virginicum	Brassicaceae			introduced	
Caesalpinia bonduc	Caesalpiniaceae	nickernut	Kelenchi	native	
Senna occidentalis	Caesalpiniaceae			introduced	
Calophyllum inophyllum	Calophyllaceae	Alexandrian laurel	Nyamplong	native	
Hippobroma longiflora	Campanulaceae			introduced	
Carica papaya	Caricaceae	pawpaw	Katis	introduced	
Casuarina equisetifolia subsp. equisetifolia	Casuarinaceae	coastal sheoak	Cemara	native	
Cleome gynandra	Cleomaceae			native	
Terminalia catappa	Combretaceae	sea almond	Ketapang	native	
Tradescantia spathacea	Commelinaceae			introduced	
Ipomoea violacea	Convolvulaceae	moon flower		native	
Ipomoea pes-caprae	Convolvulaceae	goat's-foot	Kangkong Meryap	native	
Bryophyllum pinnatum	Crassulaceae			introduced	
Syringodium isoetifolium	Cymodoceaceae	sea grass		native	
Thalassodendron ciliatum	Cymodoceaceae	sea grass		native	
Cyperus bulbosus	Cyperaceae	nut grass		native	
Cyperus javanicus	Cyperaceae			native	
Cyperus polystachyos	Cyperaceae			introduced	
Fimbristylis cymosa	Cyperaceae			native	
Queenslandiella hyalina	Cyperaceae			native	
Acalypha indica	Euphorbiaceae			native	
Acalypha lanceolata	Euphorbiaceae			native	
Euphorbia atoto	Euphorbiaceae			native	
Euphorbia cyathophora	Euphorbiaceae	dwarf poinsettia		introduced	
Euphorbia hirta	Euphorbiaceae			introduced	
Euphorbia prostrata	Euphorbiaceae			introduced	
Ricinus communis	Euphorbiaceae	castor oil plant	Pokok Jaru Jarak	introduced	
Alysicarpus vaginalis	Fabaceae			introduced	
Canavalia cathartica	Fabaceae	sea bean		native	
Crotalaria retusa	Fabaceae			introduced	
Desmodium triflorum	Fabaceae			introduced	
Erythrina variegata	Fabaceae	coral tree	Kayu Dedap	native	
Indigofera hirsuta	Fabaceae			introduced	
Leucaena leucocephala	Fabaceae	leucaena	Peteh	introduced	
Macroptilium atropurpureum	Fabaceae	siratro		introduced	
Sesbania cannabina	Fabaceae			introduced	
Sesbania grandiflora	Fabaceae		Turi	introduced	
Vigna marina	Fabaceae			native	
Enicostema axillare subsp. littorale	Gentianaceae			native	
Scaevola taccada	Goodeniaceae	sea lettuce	Kayu Kankong	native	
Hernandia nymphaeifolia	Hernandiaceae	sea hearse	Kayu Jambu Hutan	native	
Thalassia hemprichii	Hydrocharitaceae	sea grass		native	
Clerodendrum indicum	Lamiaceae			introduced	
Vitex trifolia	Lamiaceae			native	
Volkameria inermis	Lamiaceae	sorcerer's flower		native	
Cassytha filiformis	Lauraceae	devil's twine		native	
Barringtonia asiatica	Lecythidaceae	box fruit	Kayu Besagi	native	
Pemphis acidula	Lythraceae		Kayu Keriting	native	
Hibiscus tiliaceus	Malvaceae	cotton tree	Pokok Waru	native	
Sida acuta	Malvaceae			introduced	
Thespesia populnea	Malvaceae	portia tree	Waru Hutan	native	
Triumfetta repens	Malvaceae	Bingit burr		native	
Muntingia calabura	Muntingiaceae		Buah Cheri	introduced	
Eugenia sp.	Myrtaceae		Jambu Ayer	introduced	
Psidium guajava	Myrtaceae	guava	Jambu Biji	introduced	
Boerhavia albiflora	Nyctaginaceae			introduced	
Boerhavia diffusa	Nyctaginaceae			introduced	
Boerhavia repens	Nyctaginaceae			native	
Pisonia grandis	Nyctaginaceae	pisonia	Ampol	native	
Ximenia americana	Olacaceae	yellow plum	Rukam	native	
Striga angustifolia	Orobanchaceae			introduced	
Pandanus tectorius var. cocosensis	Pandanaceae	screw palm	Pandan	native	
Passiflora foetida var. hispida	Passifloraceae	stinking passionflower		introduced	
Turnera ulmifolia	Passifloraceae			introduced	
Breynia disticha	Phyllanthaceae			introduced	
Phyllanthus amarus	Phyllanthaceae			native	
Sauropus androgynus	Phyllanthaceae		Keretu	introduced	
Rivina humilis	Phytolaccaceae	coral berry		introduced	
Scoparia dulcis	Plantaginaceae			introduced	
Apluda mutica	Poaceae			introduced	
Bothriochloa bladhii	Poaceae			introduced	
Brachiaria brizantha	Poaceae			introduced	
Cenchrus ciliaris	Poaceae			introduced	
Cenchrus echinatus	Poaceae	sand burr		introduced	
Chloris barbata	Poaceae			introduced	
Chrysopogon aciculatus	Poaceae			introduced	
Cynodon dactylon	Poaceae	couch grass		introduced	
Cynodon radiatus	Poaceae			introduced	
Dactyloctenium aegyptium	Poaceae			introduced	
Desmostachya bipinnata	Poaceae			introduced	
Digitaria setigera	Poaceae			introduced	
Eleusine indica	Poaceae	crowsfoot grass		introduced	
Eragrostis amabilis	Poaceae			introduced	
Eriochloa meyeriana	Poaceae			introduced	
Imperata cylindrica var. major	Poaceae	bladey grass		introduced	
Ischaemum muticum	Poaceae			introduced	
Lepturopetium sp. aff. marshallense	Poaceae			native	
Lepturus repens	Poaceae	stalky grass		native	
Panicum repens	Poaceae			introduced	
Paspalum vaginatum	Poaceae			native	
Sporobolus fertilis	Poaceae	sand couch grass		introduced	
Stenotaphrum micranthum	Poaceae	beach buffalo grass		native	
Thuarea involuta	Poaceae	bird's-beak grass		native	
Zoysia matrella	Poaceae			native	
Unidentified sp.	Poaceae			introduced	
Portulaca oleracea	Portulacaceae	pigweed		native	
Rhizophora apiculata	Rhizophoraceae	spider mangrove		native	
Guettarda speciosa	Rubiaceae		Kembang Melati Hutan	native	
Morinda citrifolia	Rubiaceae	cheesefruit	Mengkudu	native	
Oldenlandia corymbosa	Rubiaceae			introduced	
Spermacoce remota	Rubiaceae			introduced	
Triphasia trifolia	Rutaceae		Buah Kengkit	introduced	
Allophylus cobbe	Sapindaceae			native	
Dodonaea viscosa	Sapindaceae	hopbush		native	
Physalis minima	Solanaceae		Chepelok	introduced	
Solanum americanum	Solanaceae	blackberry nightshade		introduced	
Suriana maritima	Surianaceae			native	
Laportea aestuans	Urticaceae			native	
Phyla nodiflora	Verbenaceae			introduced	
Premna serratifolia	Verbenaceae			native	
Stachytarpheta jamaicensis	Verbenaceae	blue snakeweed		introduced	

== See also ==
- Fauna of the Cocos (Keeling) Islands
