= Fundella pellucens =

Scientific classification
- Kingdom: Animalia
- Phylum: Arthropoda
- Clade: Pancrustacea
- Class: Insecta
- Order: Lepidoptera
- Family: Pyralidae
- Genus: Fundella
- Species: F. pellucens

Binomial name
- Fundella pellucens Zeller, 1848

Synonyms
- Ballovia cistipennis Dyar, 1913

Species of moth

Fundella pellucens, the Caribbean pod borer, is a species of snout moth in the genus Fundella. It was described by Zeller in 1848.

== Description ==
Fundella pellucens has a wingspan of about 20 mm (0.79 in). Its forewings are dark grey and its hindwings are creamy white with darker margins.

The larvae range from 9–15.6 mm (0.35–0.61 in) in length and are 1.4–2.5 mm (0.055–0.098 in) wide. The entire larva ranges in color from yellowish-white to brown.

The pupa of the moth ranges from 5–9.5 mm (0.20–0.37 in) in length and 1.6–2.5 mm (0.063–0.098 in) in width. The pupa ranges in color from yellowish-brown to reddish-brown.

== Range ==
It is found in Florida, Barbados, Haiti, Cuba, Montserrat, the Virgin Islands, Puerto Rico, Brazil, and Bolivia.

== Ecology ==
=== Host Plants ===
The larvae feed on a wide range of plants, including Vigna luteola, Canavalia ensiformis, Canavalia maritima, Cajan cajan, Phaseolus species (including Phaseolus lunatus) and Cassia occidentalis. Young larvae may initially feed on the flowers and continue feeding on immature legumes when they get older. There is also evidence that larvae may complete their entire development on the legumes only. They bore into the pods of their host plant and feed on the seeds. At times, legumes may be bound together with silk to form a shelter. Pupation takes place in the soil within a silk cocoon.
