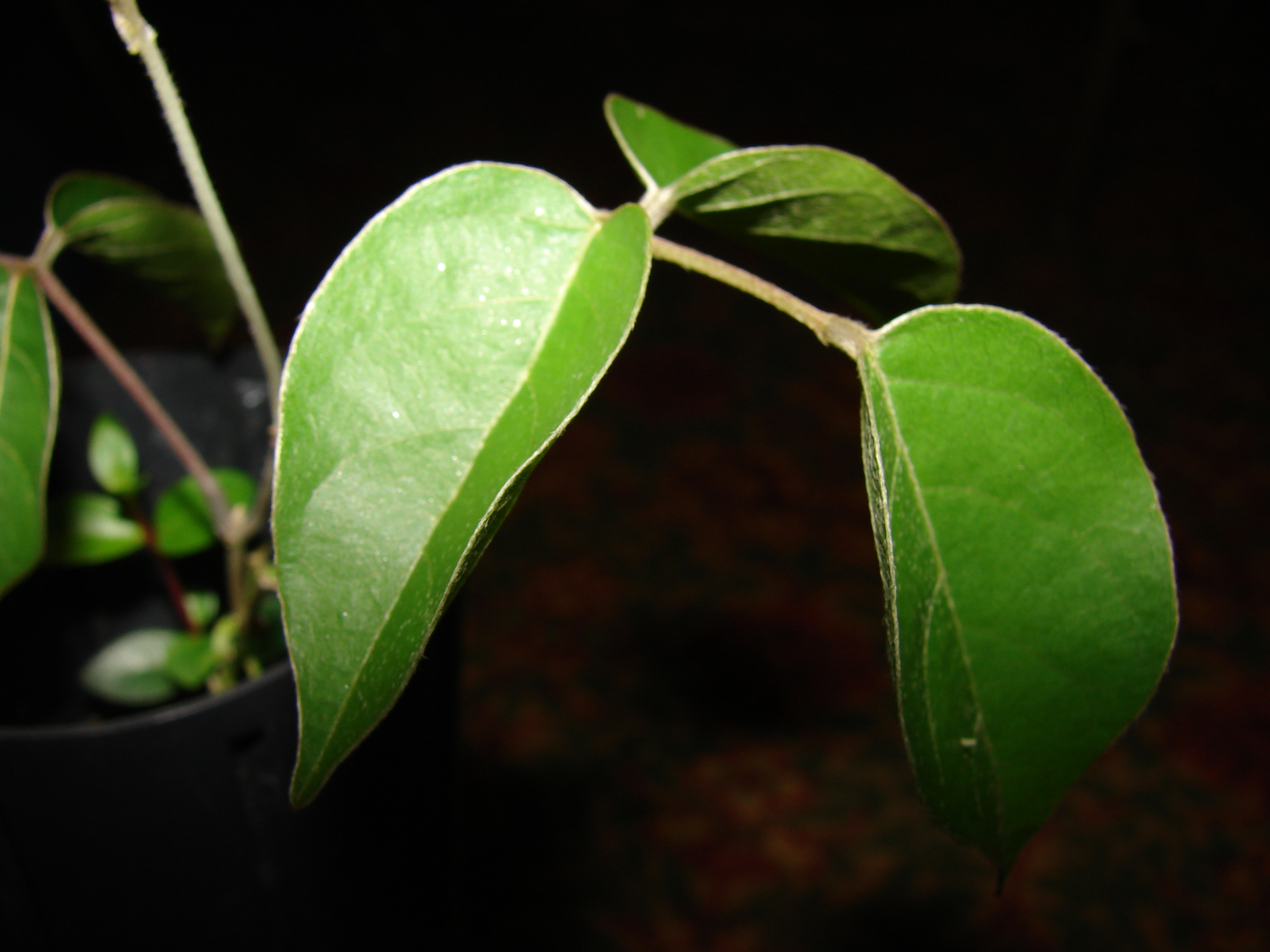

Conservation status
- Critically Endangered (IUCN 3.1)

Scientific classification
- Kingdom: Plantae
- Clade: Embryophytes
- Clade: Tracheophytes
- Clade: Spermatophytes
- Clade: Angiosperms
- Clade: Eudicots
- Clade: Rosids
- Order: Fabales
- Family: Fabaceae
- Subfamily: Faboideae
- Genus: Canavalia
- Species: C. molokaiensis

Binomial name
- Canavalia molokaiensis O.Deg., I.Deg. & J.D.Sauer

= Canavalia molokaiensis =

Species of legume

Canavalia molokaiensis, commonly known as the Molokaʻi Jack-bean or puakauhi, is a rare species flowering plant in the legume family, Fabaceae, that is endemic to the island of Molokaʻi in Hawaii. This and other Hawaiian Canavalia are known there as ʻāwikiwiki.

The plant is a vine with red-purple pealike flowers. It inhabits exposed, steep cliffs in dry and mesic forests that are dominated by ʻōhiʻa lehua (Metrosideros polymorpha) and ʻaʻaliʻi (Dodonaea viscosa) at elevations of 850–930 m (2,790–3,050 ft). Associated plants include ʻāhinahina (Artemisia spp.), ʻakoko (Euphorbia spp.), pilo (Coprosma spp.), pūkiawe (Styphelia tameiameiae), and ʻākia (Wikstroemia spp.).

This rare plant is threatened by habitat destruction, mainly due to introduced grazing mammals. It is limited to four populations with a total of 200 to 500 individuals; this is sometimes described as one badly fragmented population. Other threats include introduced plant species. This has been a federally listed endangered species of the United States since 1992.
