= Canavalia hawaiiensis =

Conservation status
- Vulnerable (IUCN 3.1)

- Vulnerable (NatureServe)

Scientific classification
- Kingdom: Plantae
- Clade: Tracheophytes
- Clade: Angiosperms
- Clade: Eudicots
- Clade: Rosids
- Order: Fabales
- Family: Fabaceae
- Subfamily: Faboideae
- Genus: Canavalia
- Species: C. hawaiiensis

Binomial name
- Canavalia hawaiiensis O.Deg., I.Deg. & J.D.Sauer

Synonyms
- List: Canavalia galeata var. hawaiiensis (O.Deg., I.Deg. & J.D.Sauer) Fosberg; Canavalia iaoensis H.St.John; Canavalia kauensis H.St.John; Canavalia rockii H.St.John; Canavalia sanguinea H.St.John

Plant species in the pea family

Canavalia hawaiiensis commonly known as 'āwikiwiki or Hawaiian jackbean, is a low growing vine of the pea family (Fabaceae) and endemic to Hawaiʻi.

== Description ==
Canavalia hawaiiensis it a perennial vine that climbs by wrapping around objects. It has compound leaves that are attached alternately to its stems. The leaflets making up the leaves are ovate to elliptic in shape and may be quite wide relative to their length. They measure 5–13 centimeters (2–5 in) long and 3–10 cm (1.2–3.9 in) across. The top of the leaves are moderately to densely covered in fine hairs that lay down against the surface of the leaflets. The undersides are also hairy, usually more densely than the upper sides. The hairs are long and tan in color. Older leaves lose hairs becoming nearly hairless.

The inflorescence is a pseudoraceme, a chain of eight to twenty flowers that measures 4–16 centimeters. The sepals measure 18–25 millimeters and are similarly hairy. The flower petals are purplish-pink with a white spot at the base of the lower one. The standard, the petal towards the top of the flower, is 30–38 millimeters in length. The two wing petals to the sides are 40–41 mm while the two keel petals on the lower side may reach 45 mm. Blooming may be as early as early as June or as late as September.

The fruit is a pod that commonly measures 22 cm (8.7 in) by 3.5 cm (1.4 in). The seeds are dark brown with a red tint.

== Taxonomy ==
The scientific description and name of Canavalia hawaiiensis was published in 1962 by Otto Degener, Isa Degener, and Jonathan Deininger Sauer. In 1966 Francis Raymond Fosberg published a description of it as a variety of the Hawaiian species Canavalia galeata, but this classification is not generally accepted. In the 1970s Harold St. John described four new species that are now considered to be synonyms of C. hawaiiensis including Canavalia kauaiensis.

=== Names ===
In English it is known by the common name Hawaiian jackbean. In the Hawaiian language it is known as 'āwikiwiki and puakauhi.

== Range and habitat ==
The natural range of Canavalia hawaiiensis is three of the Hawaiian Islands, Lanai, Maui, and the big island of Hawaiʻi. It grows in forests and shrublands at elevations from 120 meters (390 ft) to 1,220 m (4,000 ft). It is a pioneer species that will colonize dry lava flows.

=== Conservation ===
Canavalia hawaiiensis is listed in the IUCN Red List as vulnerable since its evaluation in 2010. It has a severely fragmented population and its numbers are decreasing. Similarly NatureServe evaluated it in 2003 and also rated it vulnerable (G3).

A population, initially identified as Canavalia kauaiensis, regenerated in Hawaiʻi Volcanoes National Park when an area was fenced off to exclude feral goats. It is believed that the seeds lay dormant for over two hundred years.

== Uses ==
Traditionally the flowers and seeds were used to make lei. The vines were used to make fishing nets and scoops.
