= Fundella argentina =

Scientific classification
- Domain: Eukaryota
- Kingdom: Animalia
- Phylum: Arthropoda
- Class: Insecta
- Order: Lepidoptera
- Family: Pyralidae
- Genus: Fundella
- Species: F. argentina

Binomial name
- Fundella argentina Dyar, 1919

Synonyms
- Fundella eucasis Dyar, 1919

Species of snout moth

Fundella argentina is a species of snout moth in the genus Fundella. It was described by Harrison Gray Dyar Jr. in 1919 and is known from Florida, Texas, Mexico, Cuba, Puerto Rico, Haiti, Jamaica, Venezuela, Ecuador, Brazil and Argentina.

The larvae feed on Cassia species, Caesalpinia gilliessii and Canavalia gladiata.
