= Streptomyces phyllanthi =

Scientific classification
- Domain: Bacteria
- Kingdom: Bacillati
- Phylum: Actinomycetota
- Class: Actinomycetia
- Order: Streptomycetales
- Family: Streptomycetaceae
- Genus: Streptomyces
- Species: S. phyllanthi

Binomial name
- Streptomyces phyllanthi Klykleung et al. 2016

Type strain
- JCM 30865, KCTC 39785, PA1-07, PS1-07, TISTR 2346

Species of bacterium

Streptomyces phyllanthi is a bacterium species from the genus of Streptomyces which has been isolated from the stem of the tree Phyllanthus amarus.

== See also ==
- List of Streptomyces species
