= Fundella =

Scientific classification
- Kingdom: Animalia
- Phylum: Arthropoda
- Clade: Pancrustacea
- Class: Insecta
- Order: Lepidoptera
- Family: Pyralidae
- Subfamily: Phycitinae
- Genus: Fundella; Zeller, 1848

Synonyms
- Ballovia Dyar, 1913

Genus of moths

Fundella is a genus of snout moths described by Philipp Christoph Zeller in 1848.

== Species ==
- Fundella agapella Schaus, 1923
- Fundella ahemora Dyar, 1914
- Fundella argentina Dyar, 1919
- Fundella ignobilis Heinrich, 1945
- Fundella pellucens Zeller, 1848
