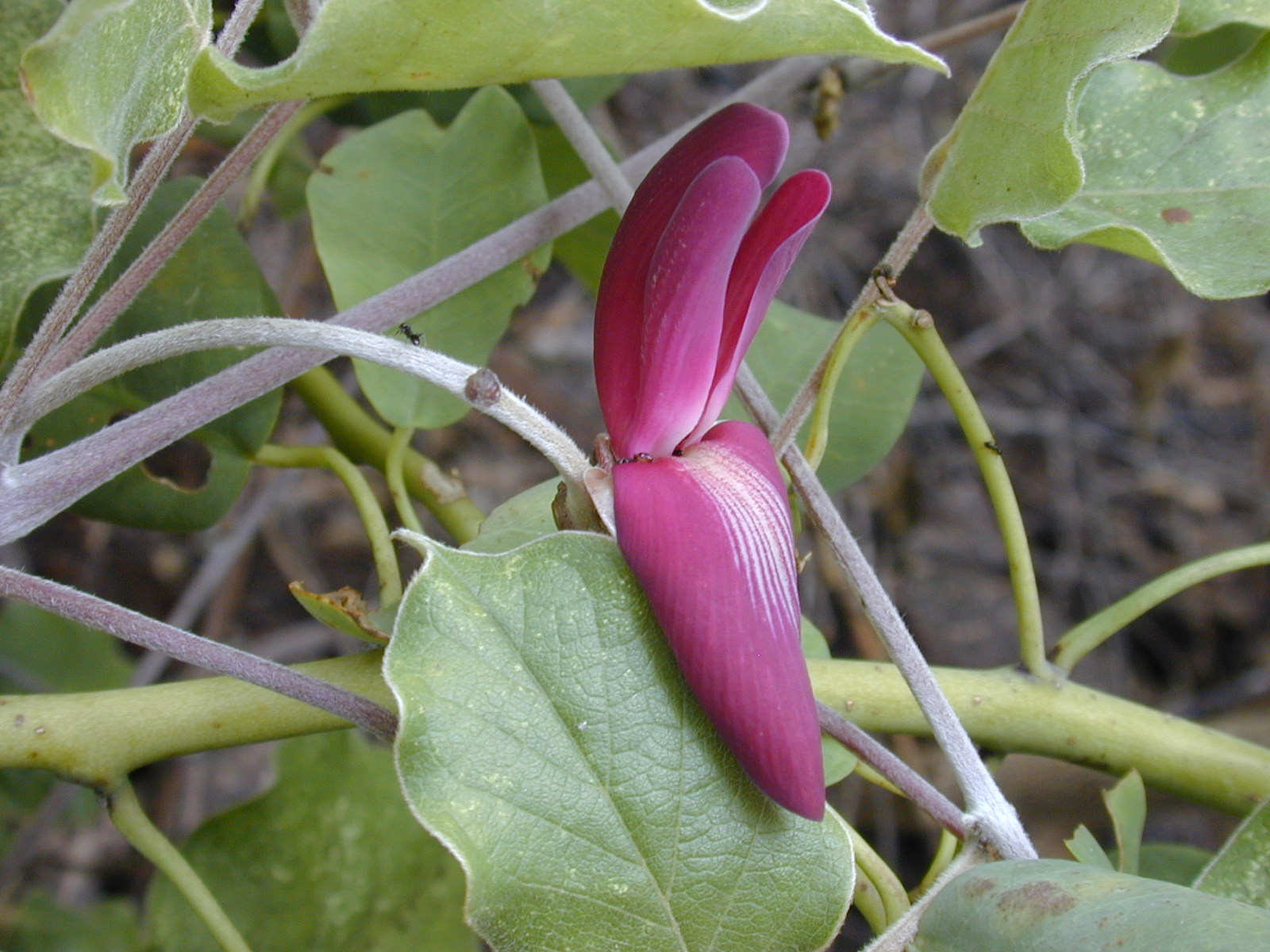

Conservation status
- Critically Endangered (IUCN 3.1)

Scientific classification
- Kingdom: Plantae
- Clade: Embryophytes
- Clade: Tracheophytes
- Clade: Spermatophytes
- Clade: Angiosperms
- Clade: Eudicots
- Clade: Rosids
- Order: Fabales
- Family: Fabaceae
- Subfamily: Faboideae
- Genus: Canavalia
- Species: C. pubescens

Binomial name
- Canavalia pubescens Hook. & Arn.

= Canavalia pubescens =

Species of legume

Canavalia pubescens, commonly known as ʻĀwikiwiki or Lavafield Jack-bean, is a species of flowering plant in the legume family, Fabaceae, that is endemic to Hawaii.

Its natural habitats are dry forests and low shrublands. It is threatened by habitat destruction, mainly due to introduced grazing mammals. The US Fish and Wildlife Service recently proposed to list this plant as an endangered species.
