= Fundella ahemora =

Scientific classification
- Kingdom: Animalia
- Phylum: Arthropoda
- Class: Insecta
- Order: Lepidoptera
- Family: Pyralidae
- Genus: Fundella
- Species: F. ahemora

Binomial name
- Fundella ahemora Dyar, 1914

Species of moth

Fundella ahemora is a species of snout moth in the genus Fundella. It was described by Harrison Gray Dyar Jr. in 1914, and is known from Mexico, Guatemala, and Costa Rica.
