= Fundella agapella =

Scientific classification
- Domain: Eukaryota
- Kingdom: Animalia
- Phylum: Arthropoda
- Class: Insecta
- Order: Lepidoptera
- Family: Pyralidae
- Genus: Fundella
- Species: F. agapella

Binomial name
- Fundella agapella Schaus, 1923

Species of moth

Fundella agapella is a species of snout moth in the genus Fundella. It was described by William Schaus in 1923, and is known from the Galapagos Islands.
