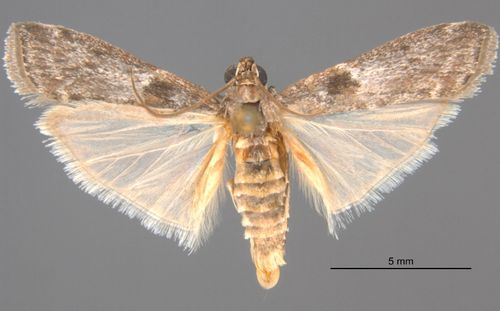

Scientific classification
- Domain: Eukaryota
- Kingdom: Animalia
- Phylum: Arthropoda
- Class: Insecta
- Order: Lepidoptera
- Family: Pyralidae
- Genus: Fundella
- Species: F. ignobilis

Binomial name
- Fundella ignobilis Heinrich, 1945

= Fundella ignobilis =

Species of moth

Fundella ignobilis is a species of snout moth in the genus Fundella. It was described by Carl Heinrich in 1945, and is known from Mexico and Texas.
