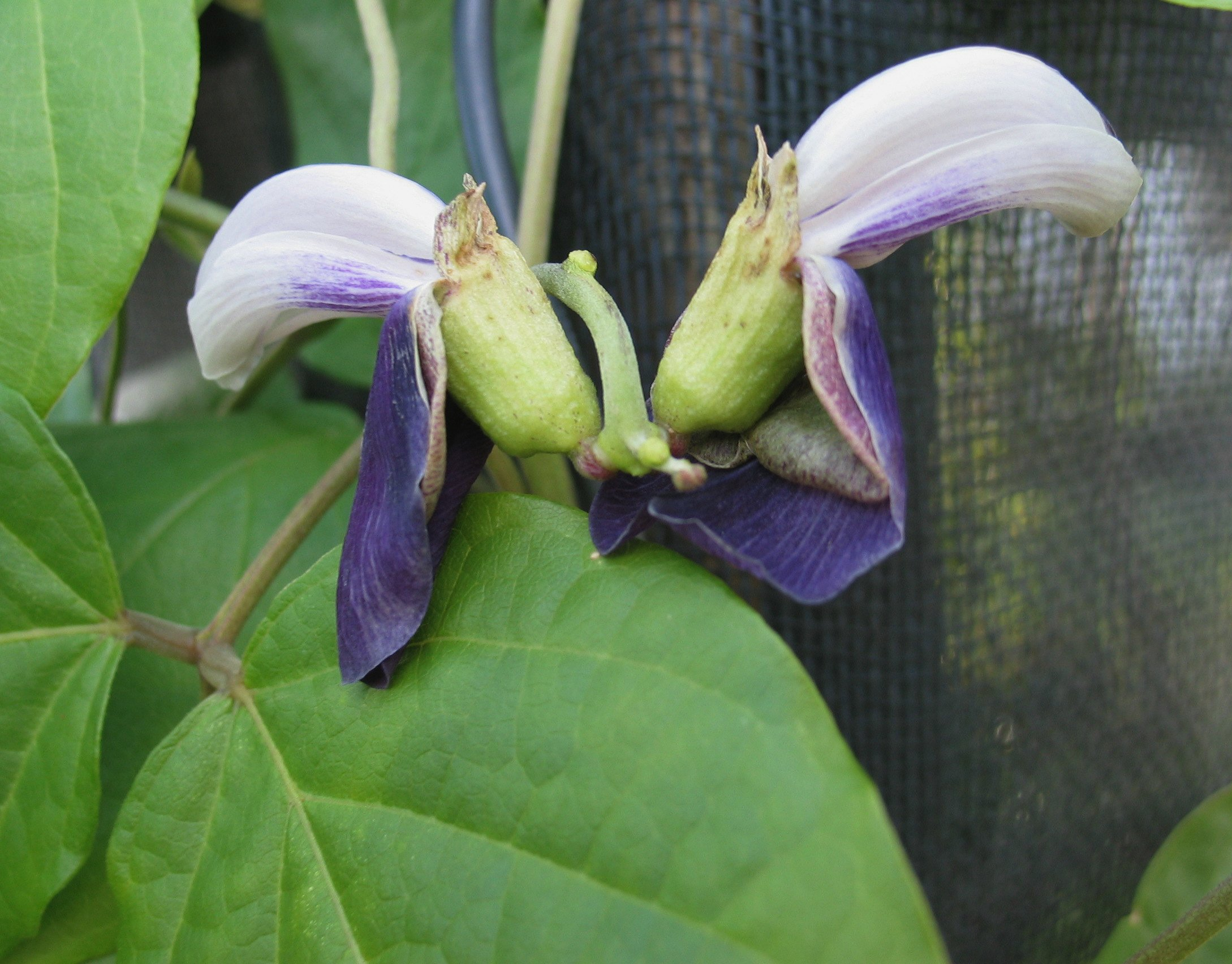

Conservation status
- Critically Endangered (IUCN 3.1)

Scientific classification
- Kingdom: Plantae
- Clade: Embryophytes
- Clade: Tracheophytes
- Clade: Spermatophytes
- Clade: Angiosperms
- Clade: Eudicots
- Clade: Rosids
- Order: Fabales
- Family: Fabaceae
- Subfamily: Faboideae
- Genus: Canavalia
- Species: C. napaliensis

Binomial name
- Canavalia napaliensis H.St.John

= Canavalia napaliensis =

Species of legume

Canavalia napaliensis, commonly known as the Mākaha Valley Jack-bean, is a species of flowering plant in the pea family, Fabaceae, that is endemic to Hawaii. It was previously more widespread in the archipelago and could be found in Oʻahu's Mākaha Valley, but is today restricted to northwestern Kauaʻi. This and other Hawaiian Canavalia are known there as ʻāwikiwiki.

Its natural habitats are tropical dry forests, lowland moist forests, dry shrublands, and moist shrublands. It is threatened by habitat destruction, mainly due to introduced grazing mammals. There are no more than 206 individual plants left in five populations along the Nā Pali Coast. This plant was listed endangered along with 47 other Kauai species in 2010.
