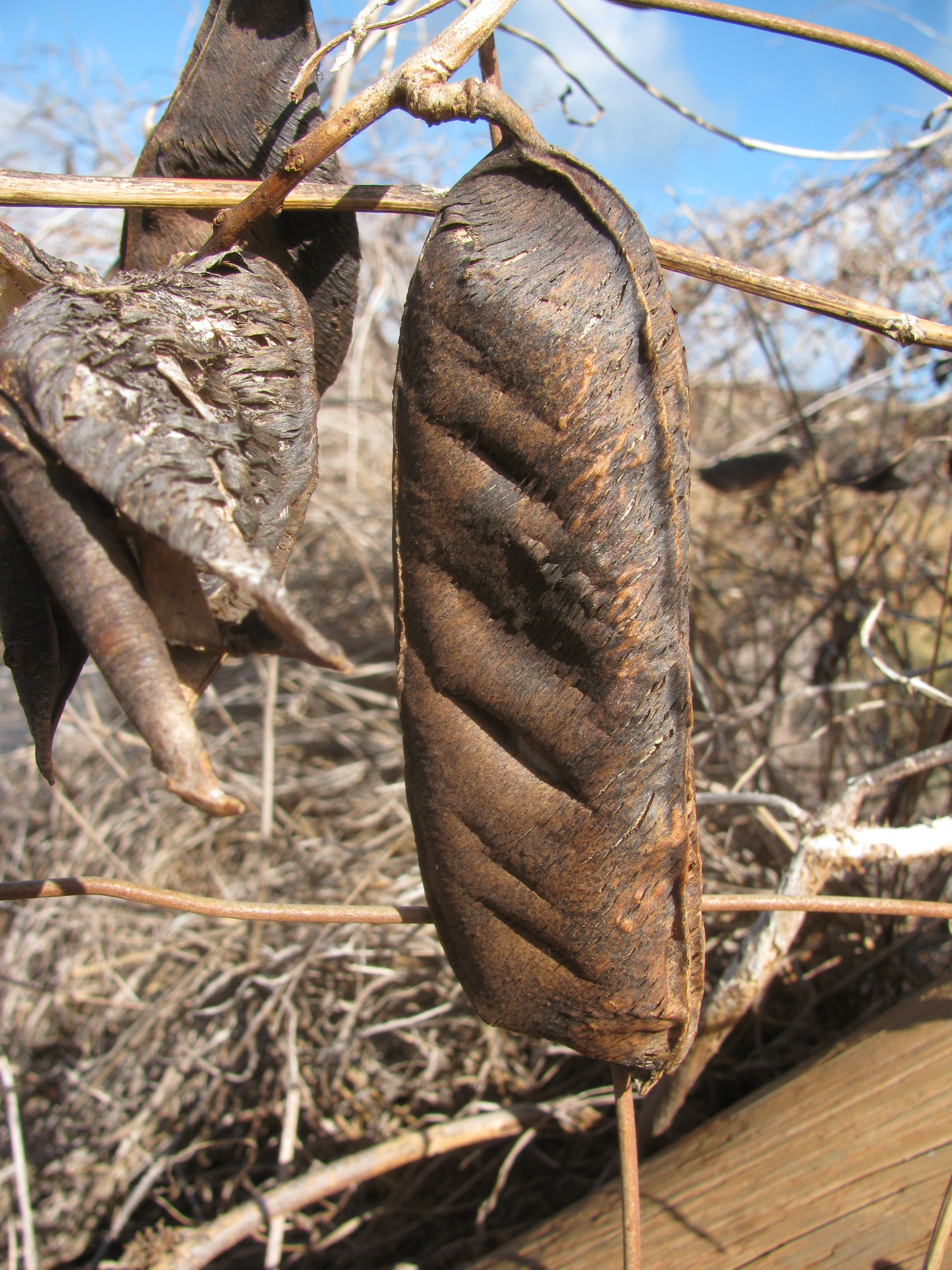

Scientific classification
- Kingdom: Plantae
- Clade: Embryophytes
- Clade: Tracheophytes
- Clade: Spermatophytes
- Clade: Angiosperms
- Clade: Eudicots
- Clade: Rosids
- Order: Fabales
- Family: Fabaceae
- Subfamily: Faboideae
- Genus: Canavalia
- Species: C. cathartica

Binomial name
- Canavalia cathartica Thouars

Synonyms
- Canavalia glandifolia Canavalia microcarpa Canavalia polystachya Canavalia turgida Canavalia virosa Dolichos virosus Lablab microcarpus Phaseolus virosus

= Canavalia cathartica =

Species of legume

Canavalia cathartica, commonly known as maunaloa in the Hawaiian language, is a species of flowering plant in the legume family, Fabaceae. The Hawaiian name translates as long mountain. In English it may also be known as poisonous sea bean, ground jack bean, horse bean, silky sea bean or wild bean. It has a Paleotropical distribution, occurring throughout tropical regions in Asia, Africa, Australia, and many Pacific Islands, and extending just into subtropical areas. It is not native to Hawaii, and is an invasive species there.

== Description ==
This plant is a biennial or perennial herb with thick, twining, climbing stems. The pinnate leaves are each divided into three papery leaflets which are generally oval in shape with pointed or rounded tips. They are up to 20 centimeters (7.9 in) long by 14 cm (5.5 in) wide, but usually smaller. The inflorescence is a raceme or pseudoraceme of several flowers. The flower has a bell-shaped calyx of sepals with two lips, an upper lip with two lobes and a lower lip with three teeth. The flower corolla is pink or purplish with a white-spotted standard petal and two wing and two keel petals each roughly 3 cm (1.2 in) long. The fruit is an inflated, turgid legume pod up to 13.5 cm (5.3 in) long by 4.5 cm (1.8 in) wide. The fresh, mature pod can weigh over 32 g (1.1 oz). The hard, smooth seeds are reddish brown, darkening deeper brown, and reaching nearly 2 cm (0.8 in) long by one 1 cm (0.4 in) wide.

== Ecology ==
In India this plant grows in mangroves. The seeds float on the water and land on coastal sand dunes, where the plant establishes. It is mat-forming and binds the sand, preventing erosion.

This legume has a rich microbial ecology, including its nodal rhizobia, its arbuscular mycorrhizae, and an assemblage of endophytic fungi. Common arbuscular fungal associates include the glomeromycetes Gigaspora albida, Acaulospora spinosa, and several species of Glomus, including G. aggregatum. Microbial surveys have catalogued many endophytes in the plant, with varying assemblages in different habitat types. It houses the ascomycete Chaetomium globosum in its roots. It also contains Colletotrichum dematium, Aspergillus niger, A. flavus, Fusarium oxysporum, and Penicillium chrysogenum. The microbial life hosted by the plant likely helps it persist in harsh coastal habitat.

== Uses ==
The seeds and pods are used as famine foods in coastal India. It is considered to be an underutilized wild plant with the potential to serve as a protein- and carbohydrate-rich food crop. It has more protein than several other edible legumes such as pigeon pea, chickpea, and cowpea. It grows rapidly, tolerates challenging habitat types such as dry, sandy, saline soils, and appears to be fairly pest-resistant.

Like many legumes, C. cathartica contains antinutrients and requires some processing or preparation before it can be used for food. Antinutrients in the species include phenols, tannins, and lectins such as phytohaemagglutinin. Pressure cooking can reduce antinutrients. Roasting is somewhat less effective.

In small-scale agriculture, farmers use this plant as green manure and mulch and host it in their fields for its nitrogen fixation. It grows easily on farmland in mangrove wetlands, it native habitat. It is used as cattle fodder. The stems with pods and leaves are fed to rabbits and hares.

In numerous recent studies from India it is claimed that this species is the wild ancestor of Canavalia gladiata, referencing the 1974 third or paperback edition or the 1968 hardback edition of Tropical Crops: Dicotyledons by J. W. Purseglove, where it mentions that C. virosa may be the ancestor of C. gladiata, however this is likely in error, as with C. virosa in 1968 or 1974 one meant the modern C. africana using the then current taxonomy. Sauer himself proposed C. gladiolata as the ancestor of C. gladiata in the afore-mentioned article.

The plant grows in Micronesia, where the island inhabitants use it as an herbal remedy for conditions such as cough.

In Hawaii, where it is a non-native and invasive species, its showy flowers and large seeds are used in leis.
