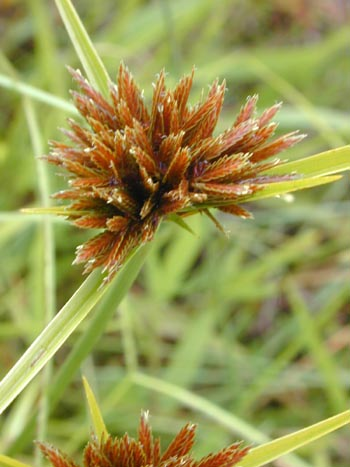
- Flower head

Conservation status
- Least Concern (IUCN 3.1)

Scientific classification
- Kingdom: Plantae
- Clade: Tracheophytes
- Clade: Angiosperms
- Clade: Monocots
- Clade: Commelinids
- Order: Poales
- Family: Cyperaceae
- Genus: Cyperus
- Species: C. polystachyos

Binomial name
- Cyperus polystachyos Rottb.

Synonyms
- Pycreus polystachyos (Rottb.) P.Beauv.; Chlorocyperus polystachyus (Rottb.) Rikli; plus many others

= Cyperus polystachyos =

Bunchy sedge

Species of plant

Cyperus polystachyos, also known as Pycreus polystachyos, and also called manyspike flatsedge in the US, or bunchy sedge, coast flatsedge, many-spiked sedge or Texas sedge in Australia, is a herbaceous species in the family Cyperaceae, widespread in tropical and subtropical areas around the world, sometimes extending its range into temperate regions.

== Description ==
The rhizomatous, perennial or annual grass-like sedge typically grows to a height of 0.15 to 0.6 metres (0.5 to 2.0 ft). It blooms between summer and winter and produces green-brown flowers. The stems are rigid with a thickness of 1 to 3 millimetres (0.039 to 0.118 in). Stems are glabrous with a triangular cross-section. The leaves are very narrow, around 1 to 4 mm (0.039 to 0.157 in) with a grass-like appearance and are often tufted at the base of the plant. The seed-head is an irregular cluster formation at the tip of the stem with brown spikes that have three to six green leafy bracts underneath.

== Distribution ==
It is common in the Neotropics as a weed in grass lawns.

In Australia the species is widespread in warmer climates and found from sea level to an altitude of around 1,020 metres (3,346 ft). The species is found along rivers and creeks in a range of ecosystems from rainforest, melaleuca forest, vine thickets, eucalypt forest and swamps in a variety of woodland and grassland areas including in salty mud and marshes of the ocean shore.

In Australia the species is found mostly in coastal location, north of Perth in Western Australia and through the Northern Territory, Queensland and New South Wales.

In the United States, it has been reported from a region stretching from Texas to Maine.

== See also ==
- List of Cyperus species
