= Vorsila Bohrer =

American botanist (1931–2023)

Vorsila Laurene Bohrer (January 22, 1931 – January 20, 2021) was an American ethnobotanist who specialized in the cultures of the American Southwest. Her papers and field notes are in the collection of the Arizona State Museum.

== Early life and education ==
Bohrer was born in Chicago, Illinois and raised in Prospect Heights, Illinois. She visited the Southwest United States during a Girl Scout Archaeological Tour. The trip later influenced her career path.

Bohrer graduated from the University of Arizona in 1953 with bachelor's degrees in anthropology and botany. She later received a master's degree from the University of Michigan.

== Career ==
Bohrer worked in the Ethnobotanical Laboratory at the University of Michigan. She was Assistant Curator of Ethnology at the Museum of New Mexico and taught at Hanover College in Indiana. She earned a PhD from the University of Arizona in 1968. She did fieldwork with Emil Haury at Snaketown in the Hohokam Pima National Monument around the same time.

Bohrer taught biology at the University of Massachusetts in 1969 and worked as a technical assistant at the Harvard Botanical Museum where she assisted Richard Evans Schultes. She taught at the University of Arizona and at Eastern New Mexico University in the late 1970s.

Bohrer founded Southwest Ethnobotanical Enterprises and studied plants in the Southwestern Salado, Hohokam and Anasazi cultural areas. Her research papers and field notes are in the collection of the Arizona State Museum.

== Published works ==
- Ethnobotanical Techniques and Approaches at Salmon Ruin New Mexico, Bohrer, Vorsila L. and Karen R. Adams, 1977
- "The Research Potential of Plant Remains from Fresnal Shelter, an Archaic Site in South-Central New Mexico", Annals of the New York Academy of Sciences, December 1981
