= Jonathan Deininger Sauer =

American botanist (1918–2008)

Jonathan Deininger Sauer (July 16, 1918, in Ann Arbor, Michigan – May 25, 2008, in Pacific Palisades, Los Angeles) was a botanist and plant geographer.

Jonathan D. Sauer, whose father was Carl O. Sauer, graduated in 1939 from the University of California, Berkeley with a B.A. in history. He then entered the graduate program in geography at the University of Wisconsin–Madison. His academic career was interrupted by WW II when he was drafted into the U.S. Army Air Forces. He was stationed at the Pentagon, where he worked as a weather specialist. He married in 1946 and became a graduate student in botany, studying under Edgar Anderson at Washington University in St. Louis. Sauer graduated there in 1950 with a Ph.D. dissertation on the grain amaranths. In 1950 he returned to the University of Wisconsin–Madison as an instructor in the botany department. His research dealt with "plant taxonomy, plant geography, economic botany and plant evolution." In 1959 he became a professor at U. W. Madison with a joint appointment in the departments of botany and geography. In 1971 Sauer became a professor in the geography department of the University of California, Los Angeles (UCLA), where he retired as professor emeritus.

In 1946 he married Hilda Sievers (1922–2019), whom he met when they both worked at the Pentagon. They had a son, Richard (b. 1951).

== Selected publications ==
=== Articles ===
- Sauer, Jonathan D. (1950). "Amaranths as Dye Plants among the Pueblo Peoples". Southwestern Journal of Anthropology. 6 (4): 412–415. doi:10.1086/soutjanth.6.4.3628567. S2CID 163433458.
- Fassett, Norman C.; —— (1950). "Studies of Variation in the Weed Genus Phytolacca. I. Hybridizing Species in Northeastern Colombia". Evolution. 4 (4): 332. doi:10.2307/2405600. JSTOR 2405600. (See Phytolacca.)
- —— (1950). "The Grain Amaranths: A Survey of Their History and Classification". Annals of the Missouri Botanical Garden. 37 (4): 561–632. doi:10.2307/2394403. JSTOR 2394403.
- —— (1951). "Crop plants of ancient Peru modelled in pottery". Bulletin of the Missouri Botanical Garden. 39: 187–194.
- —— (1952). "A Geography of Pokeweed". Annals of the Missouri Botanical Garden. 39 (2): 113–125. doi:10.2307/2394507. JSTOR 2394507.
- —— (1953). "Herbarium Specimens as Records of Genetic Research". The American Naturalist. 87 (834): 155–156. doi:10.1086/281772. S2CID 84817143.
- Tucker, John M.; —— (1958). "Aberrant Amaranthus Populations of the Sacramento-San Joaquin Delta, California". Madroño. 14 (8): 252–261. JSTOR 41423581.
- —— (1962). "Effects of Recent Tropical Cyclones on the Coastal Vegetation of Mauritius". The Journal of Ecology. 50 (2): 275–290. Bibcode:1962JEcol..50..275S. doi:10.2307/2257445. JSTOR 2257445.
- —— (1967). "The Grain Amaranths and Their Relatives: A Revised Taxonomic and Geographic Survey". Annals of the Missouri Botanical Garden. 54 (2): 103–137. doi:10.2307/2394998. JSTOR 2394998.
- —— (1969). "Oceanic Islands and Biogeographical Theory: A Review". Geographical Review. 59 (4): 582–593. Bibcode:1969GeoRv..59..582S. doi:10.2307/213863. JSTOR 213863.
- —— (1969). "Identity of Archaeologic Grain Amaranths from the Valley of Tehuacan, Puebla, Mexico". American Antiquity. 34 (1): 80–81. doi:10.2307/278318. JSTOR 278318. S2CID 163347815.
- Bohrer, Vorsila L.; Cutler, Hugh C.; —— (1969). "Carbonized Plant Remains from Two Hohokam Sites, Arizona Bb: 13:41 and Arizona Bb: 13:50". Kiva. 35: 1–10. doi:10.1080/00231940.1969.11760557. (See Hohokam.)
- —— (1972). "Revision of Stenotaphrum (Gramineae: Paniceae) with Attention to Its Historical Geography". Brittonia. 24 (2): 202–222. Bibcode:1972Britt..24..202S. doi:10.2307/2805871. JSTOR 2805871. S2CID 7710135. (See Stenotaphrum.)
- —— (1972). "The Dioecious Amaranths: A New Species Name and Major Range Extensions". Madroño. 21 (6): 426–434. JSTOR 41423815.
- —— (1990). "Guest Editorial: Allopatric Speciation: Deduced but Not Detected". Journal of Biogeography. 17 (1): 1–3. JSTOR 2845182.

=== Books ===
- Sauer, Jonathan D. (1961). "Coastal plant geography of Mauritius". Baton Rouge, Louisiana State University Press.
- —— (1967). "Geographic reconnaissance of seashore vegetation along the Mexican Gulf coast". Baton Rouge: Louisiana State University Press.
- —— (1967). "Plants and man on the Seychelles Coast; a study in historical biogeography". Madison: University of Wisconsin Press.
- —— (1982). Cayman Islands seashore vegetation : a study in comparative biogeography. Berkeley: University of California Press. ISBN 9780520096561.
- —— (1988). Plant migration : the dynamics of geographic patterning in seed plant species. Berkeley: University of California Press. ISBN 9780520909861.
- —— (1993). Historical geography of crop plants : a select roster. Boca Raton: CRC Press. ISBN 9780849389016.
