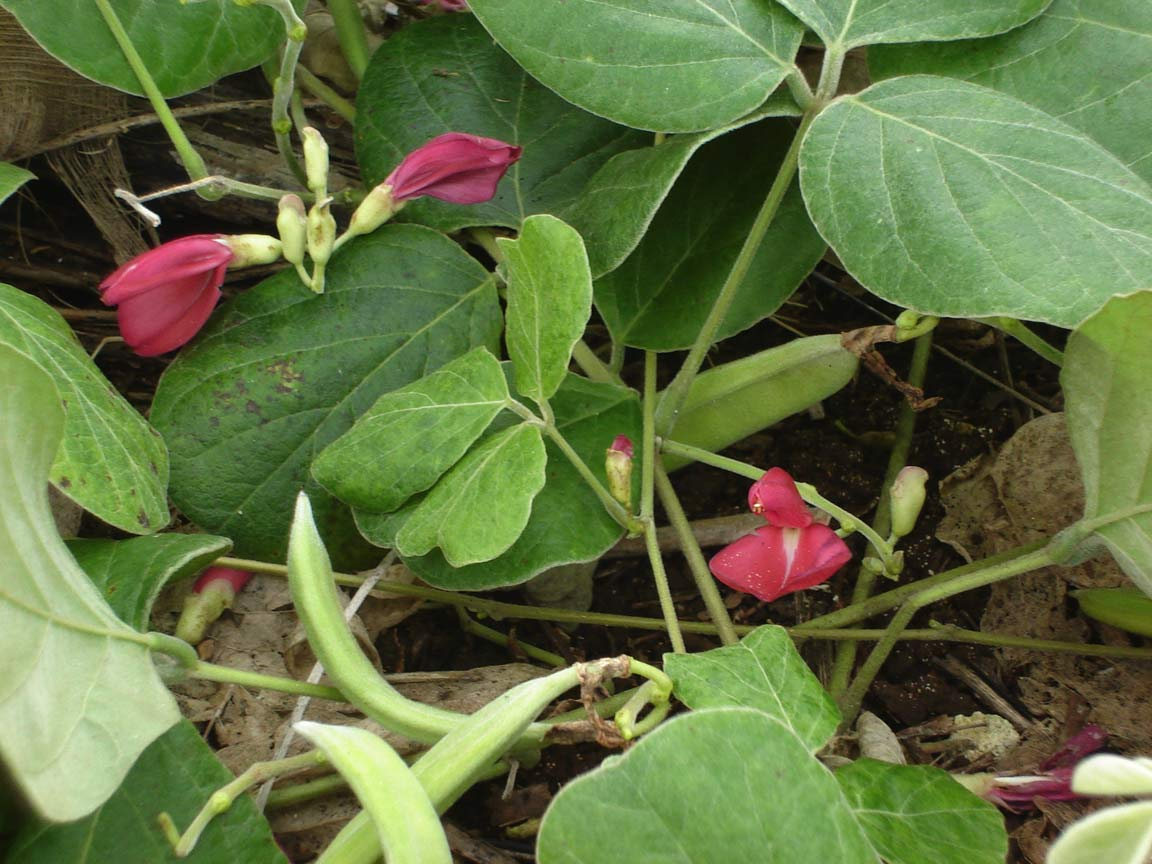
- Canavalia sericea

Scientific classification
- Kingdom: Plantae
- Clade: Tracheophytes
- Clade: Angiosperms
- Clade: Eudicots
- Clade: Rosids
- Order: Fabales
- Family: Fabaceae
- Subfamily: Faboideae
- Tribe: Diocleae
- Genus: Canavalia; DC.

Species
- 73; see text

Synonyms
- Canavali Adans.; Clementea Cav.; Cryptophaseolus Kuntze; Malocchia Savi; Wenderothia Schltdl.

= Canavalia =

Genus of legumes

Canavalia is a genus of plants in the legume family (Fabaceae) that comprises approximately 73 species of tropical vines. Members of the genus are commonly known as jack-beans. It has a pantropical distribution.

The species of Canavalia endemic to the Hawaiian Islands were named ʻāwikiwiki by the Native Hawaiians. The name translates to "the very quick one" and comes from the Hawaiian word for "fast". The genus name is derived from the Malabar word for the species, kavavali, which means "forest climber".

== Uses ==
Several species are valued legume crops, including common jack-bean (C. ensiformis), sword bean (C. gladiata) and C. cathartica. At least the first makes a beneficial weed- and pathogen-suppressing living mulch. The common jack-bean is also a source of the lectin concanavalin A, which is used as a reagent in glycoprotein biochemistry and immunology. The jack-bean is also a common source of purified urease enzyme used in scientific research.

The bay bean (Canavalia rosea) is supposedly mildly psychoactive when smoked, and is used in tobacco substitutes.

== Ecology ==
Some animals have adaptations to the defensive chemicals of jack-beans. Caterpillars such as that of the two-barred flasher (Astraptes fulgerator) are sometimes found on Canavalia. The plant pathogenic ascomycete fungus Mycosphaerella canavaliae was described from a jack-bean. Introduced herbivores have wreaked havoc on Canavalia on the Hawaiian Islands and made some nearly extinct; it may be that these lost their chemical defenses because no herbivorous mammals existed in their range until introduced by humans. The usually bright pea-flowers are pollinated by insects such as solitary bees and carpenter bees such as Xylocopa confusa.

== History ==
The genus name Canavalia was, as recently as 1913, known as Canavali. The name of the genus comes from a common name for Canavalia rosea used in India and adapted by Augustin Pyramus de Candolle.

== Diversity ==
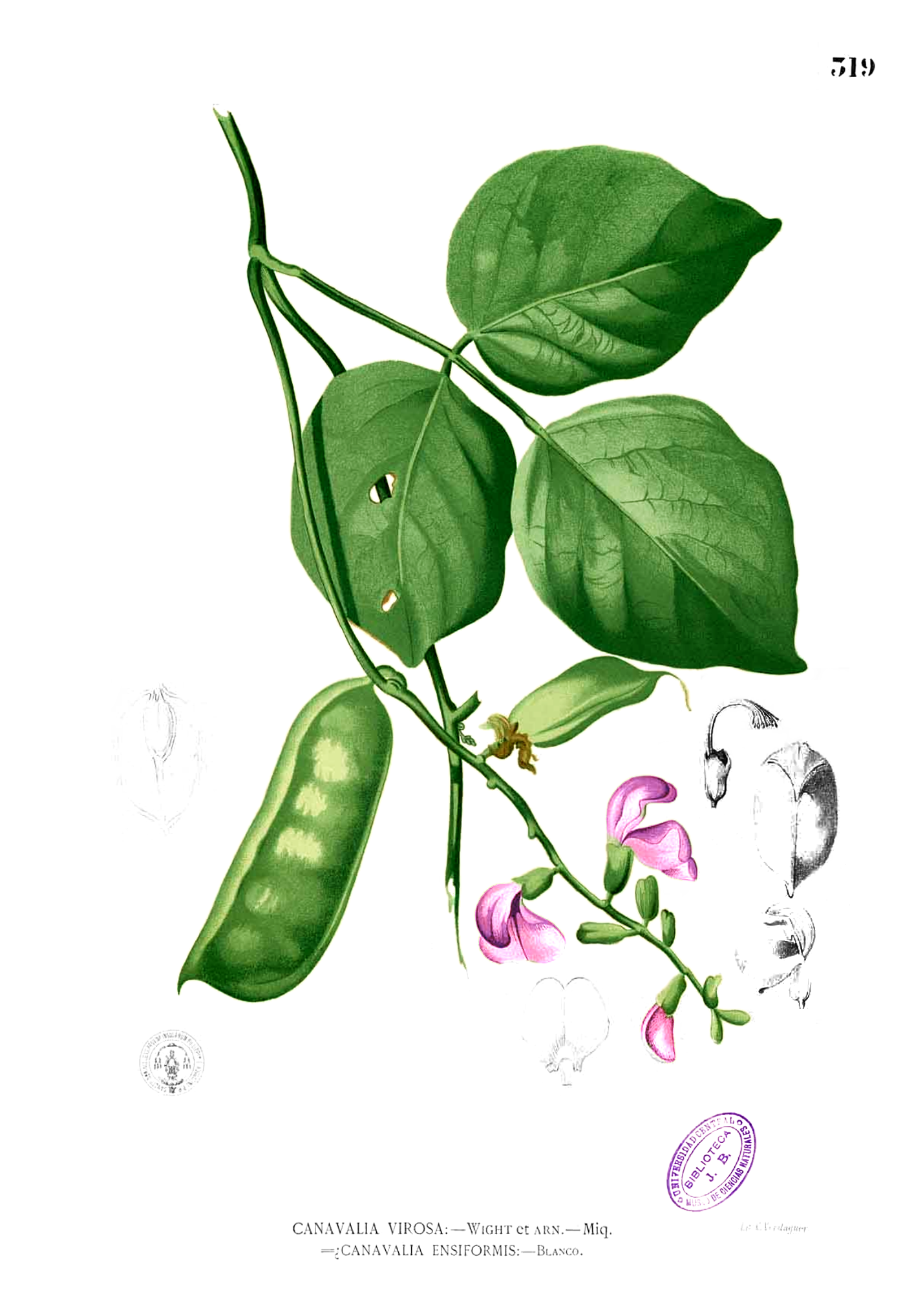
Canavalia cathartica illustration. Francisco Manuel Blanco, Flora de Filipinas, etc. (1880–1883)

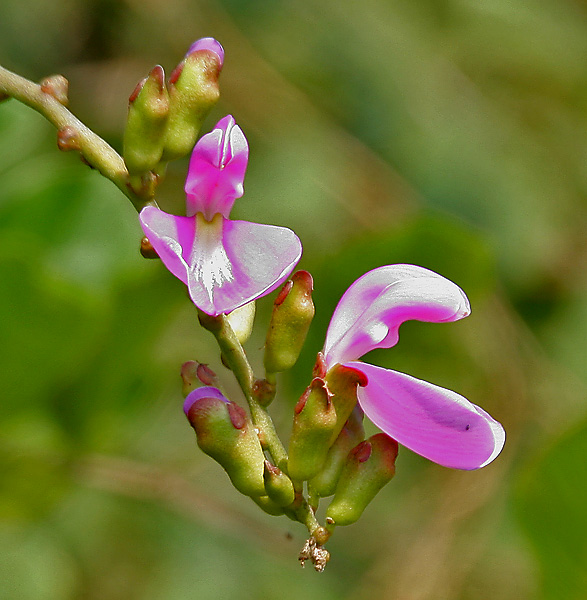
Canavalia lineata

Species include:

- Canavalia acuminata Rose
- Canavalia africana Dunn
- Canavalia altipendula (Piper) Standl.
- Canavalia atroferruginea J.Linares, G.Andrade & Cruz Durán
- Canavalia aurita J.D.Sauer
- Canavalia beniensis Aymard & Cuello
- Canavalia bicarinata Standl.
- Canavalia boliviana Piper
- Canavalia bonariensis Lindl.
- Canavalia brasiliensis Mart. ex Benth.
- Canavalia campylodonta J.Linares, G.Andrade & Cruz Durán
- Canavalia cassidea G.P.Lewis
- Canavalia cathartica Thouars
- Canavalia concinna J.D.Sauer
- Canavalia cuchillae J.Linares, G.Andrade & Cruz Durán
- Canavalia dolichothyrsa G.P.Lewis
- Canavalia dura J.D.Sauer
- Canavalia ensiformis (L.) DC. – common jack-bean, giant stock-bean, gotani-bean, horse-bean, seaside-bean, wonder-bean, feijão-de-porco (Brazil)
- Canavalia eurycarpa Piper
- Canavalia favieri I.C.Nielsen
- Canavalia galeata (Gaudich.) Vogel (Oʻahu)
- Canavalia gibbosa J.Linares, G.Andrade & Cruz Durán
- Canavalia glabra (M.Martens & Galeotti) J.D.Sauer
- Canavalia gladiata (Jacq.) DC. – sword bean, scimitar-bean
- Canavalia gladiolata J.D.Sauer
- Canavalia grandiflora Benth.
- Canavalia hawaiiensis O.Deg., I.Deg. & J.D.Sauer
- Canavalia hirsutissima J.D.Sauer
- Canavalia kauaiensis J.D.Sauer
- Canavalia lineata (Thunb.) DC.
- Canavalia llanorum Snak, Aymard & L.P.Queiroz
- Canavalia macrantha J.Linares, G.Andrade & Cruz Durán
- Canavalia macrobotrys Merr.
- Canavalia macropleura Piper
- Canavalia madagascariensis J.D.Sauer
- Canavalia mandibulata J.D.Sauer
- Canavalia mattogrossensis (Barb.Rodr.) Malme
- Canavalia matudae J.D.Sauer
- Canavalia mauiensis H.St.John
- Canavalia megalantha Merr.
- Canavalia microsperma Urb.
- Canavalia mireyae J.Linares, G.Andrade & Cruz Durán
- Canavalia mollis Wall. ex Wight & Arn.
- Canavalia molokaiensis O.Deg., I.Deg. & J.D.Sauer – Molokaʻi jack-bean
- Canavalia napaliensis H.St.John – Mākaha Valley jack-bean
- Canavalia nitida (Cav.) Piper
- Canavalia obidensis Ducke
- Canavalia oxyphylla Standl. & L.O.Williams
- Canavalia palmeri (Piper) Standl.
- Canavalia papuana Merr. & L.M.Perry
- Canavalia parviflora Benth.
- Canavalia picta Mart. ex Benth.
- Canavalia piperi Killip & J.F.Macbr.
- Canavalia plagiosperma Piper – giant bean, oblique-seed jack-bean
- Canavalia pubescens Hook. & Arn. – lavafield jack-bean
- Canavalia raiateensis J.W.Moore
- Canavalia ramosii J.D.Sauer
- Canavalia reflexiflora Snak, G.P.Lewis & L.P.Queiroz
- Canavalia regalis Dunn
- Canavalia rosea (Sw.) DC. – bay bean, beach-bean, coastal jack-bean, fire-bean, Mackenzie-bean
- Canavalia rotundata J.Linares, G.Andrade & Cruz Durán
- Canavalia rugosa J.Linares, G.Andrade & Cruz Durán
- Canavalia saueri Fantz
- Canavalia septentrionalis J.D.Sauer
- Canavalia sericea A.Gray
- Canavalia sericophylla Ducke
- Canavalia sousae J.Linares, G.Andrade & Cruz Durán
- Canavalia straminea J.Linares, G.Andrade & Cruz Durán
- Canavalia variegata J.Linares, G.Andrade & Cruz Durán
- Canavalia veillonii I.C.Nielsen
- Canavalia villosa Benth.
- Canavalia vitiensis J.D.Sauer
- Canavalia wurdackii Aymard & Cuello

=== Formerly placed here ===
- Dysolobium grande (Wall. ex Benth.) Prain (as C. grandis (Wall. ex Benth.) Kurz)

== Gallery ==
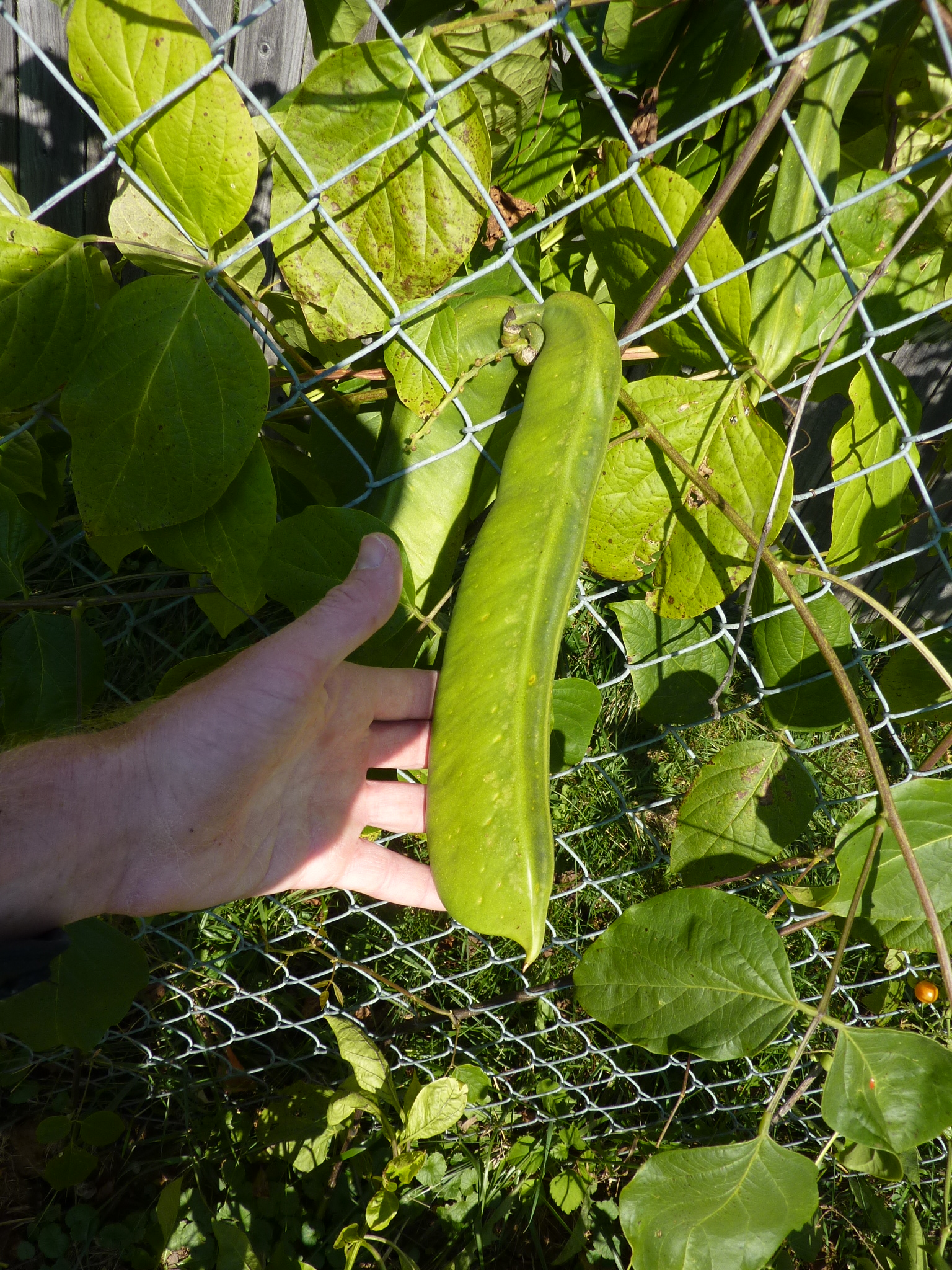
Canavalia gladiata

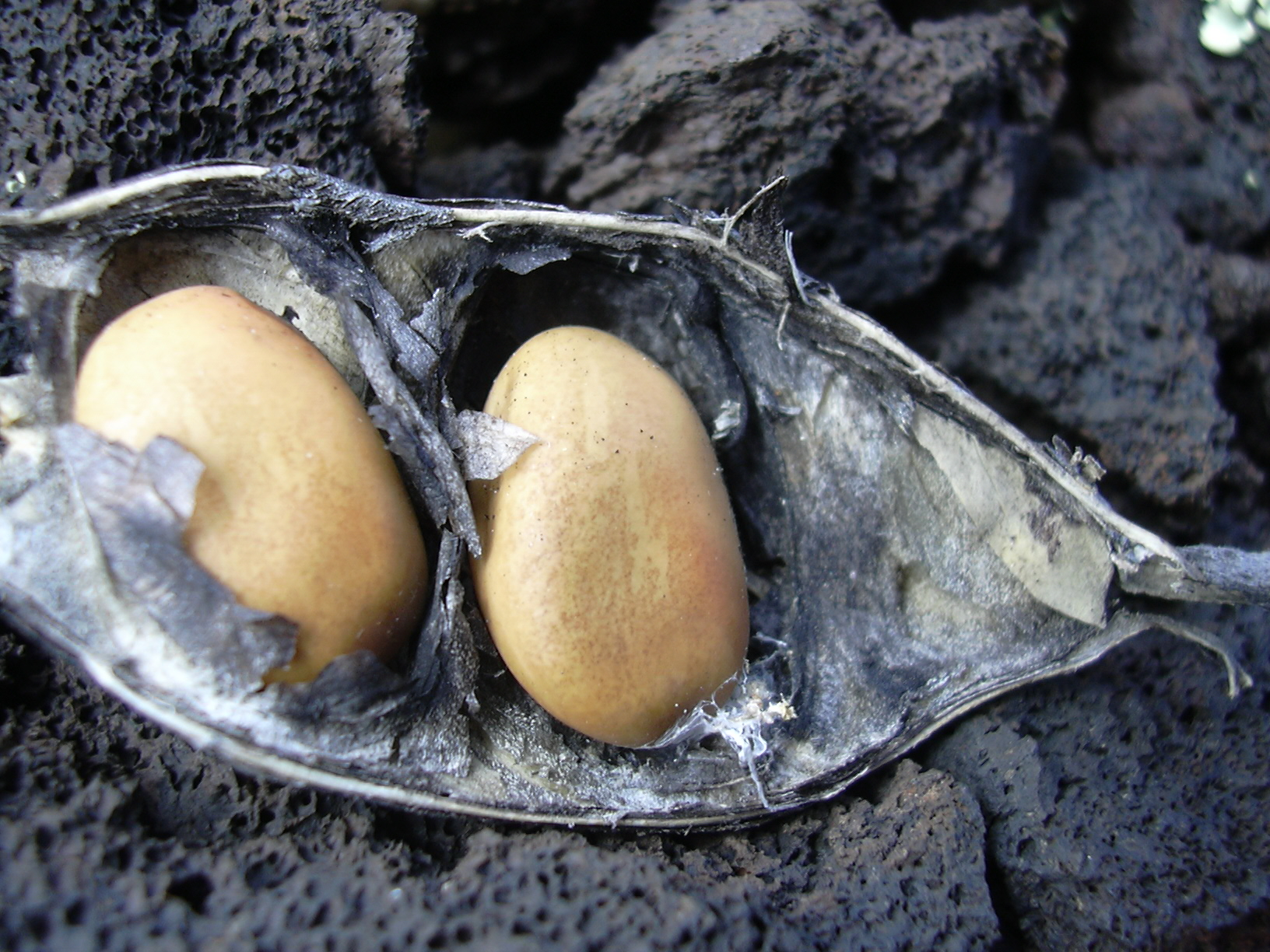
Canavalia pubescens

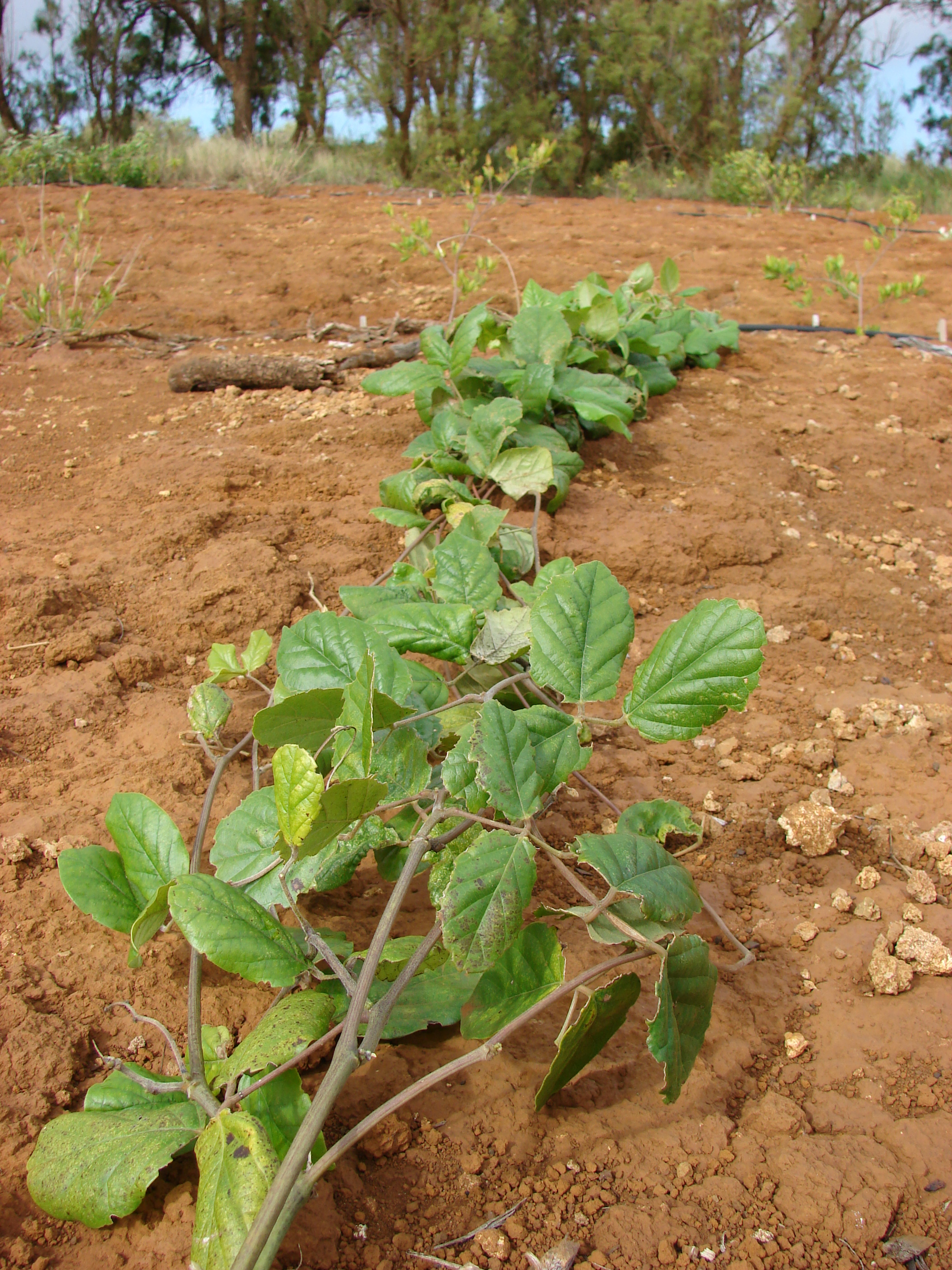
Canavalia hawaiiensis

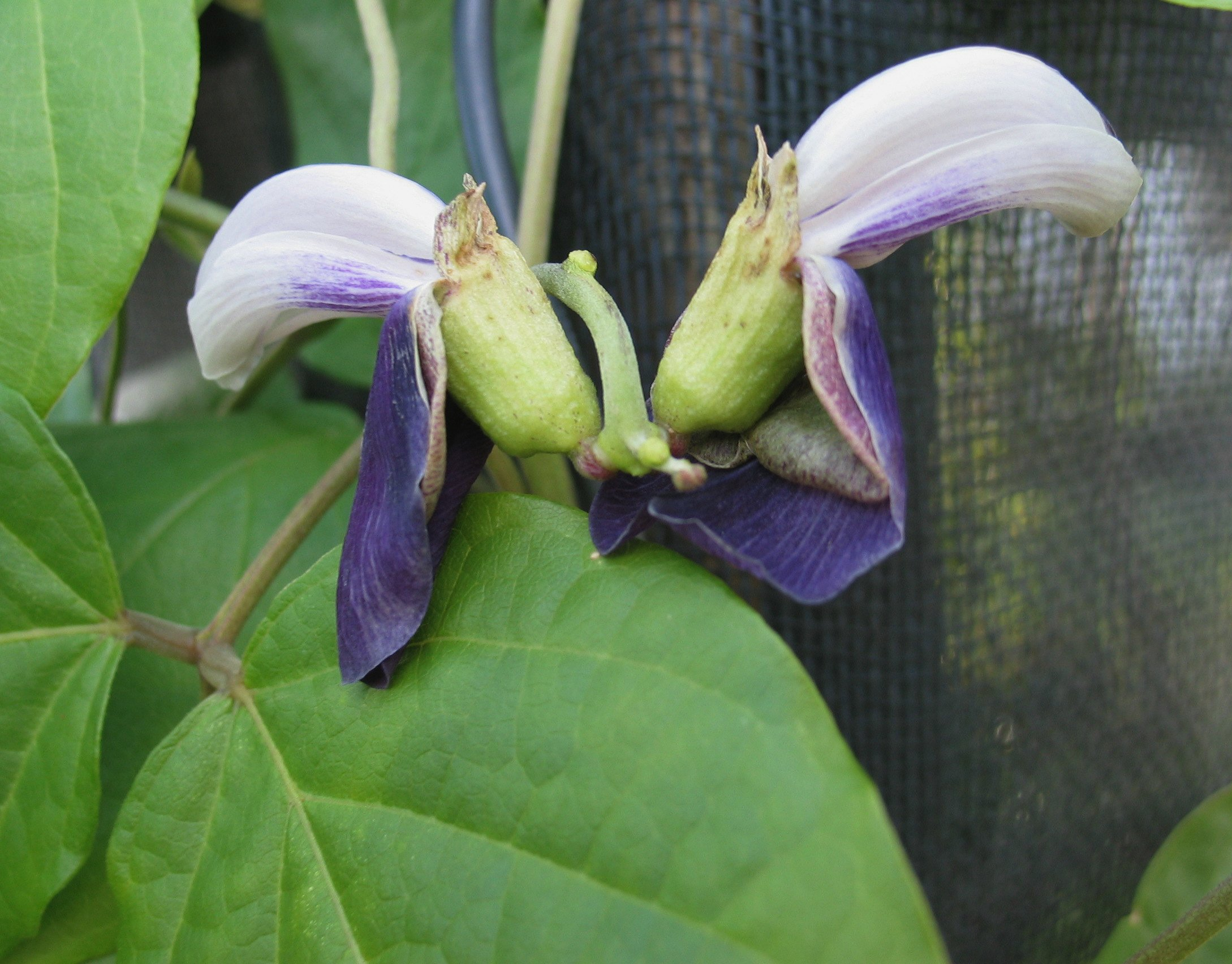
Canavalia napaliensis

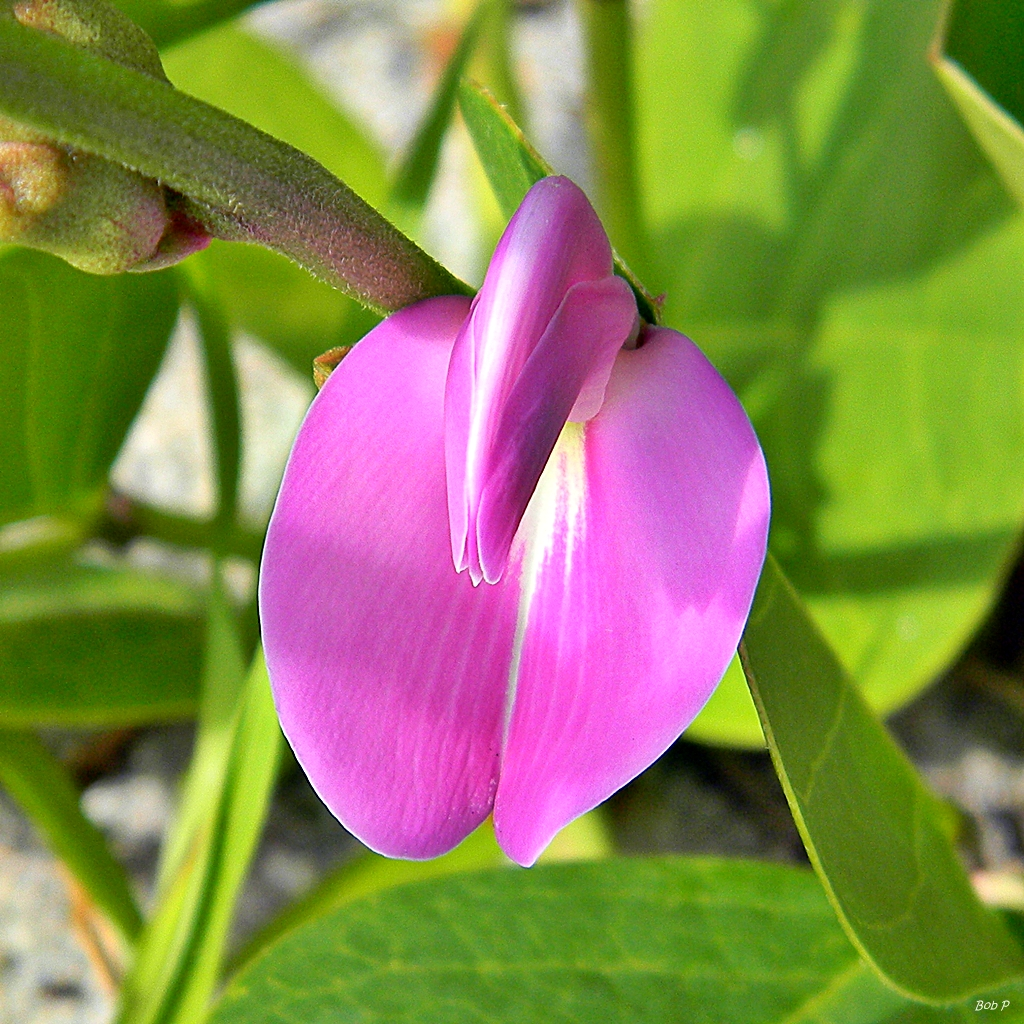
Canavalia rosea

== See also ==
- Thierry Bardini – researched Venezuelan jack-bean agriculture early in his career
