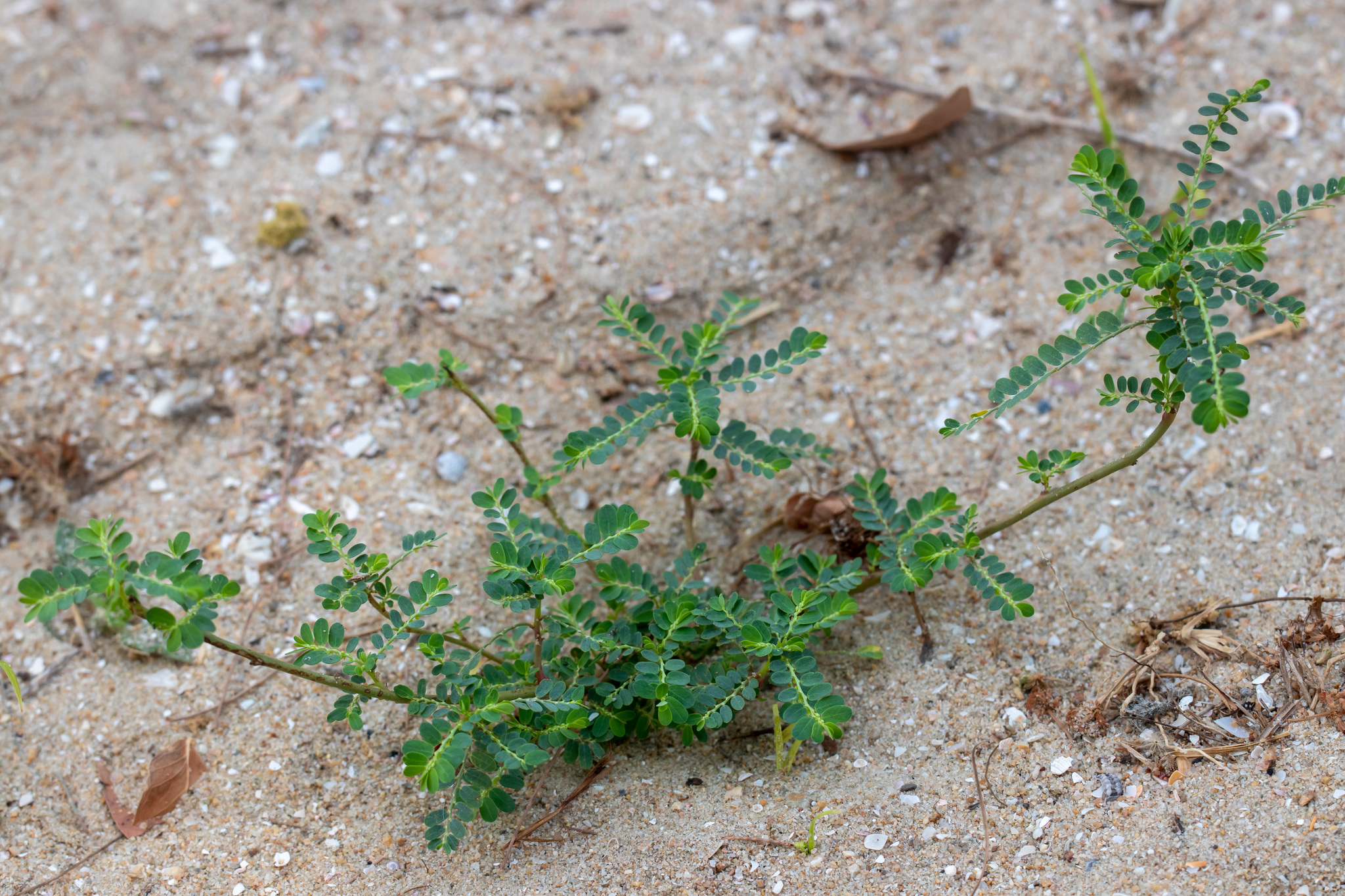
- Phyllanthus amarus from Thailand

Scientific classification
- Kingdom: Plantae
- Clade: Tracheophytes
- Clade: Angiosperms
- Clade: Eudicots
- Clade: Rosids
- Order: Malpighiales
- Family: Phyllanthaceae
- Genus: Phyllanthus
- Species: P. amarus

Binomial name
- Phyllanthus amarus Schumach. & Thonn.

Synonyms
- Moeroris amara (Schumach. & Thonn.) R.W.Bouman; Phyllanthus niruri var. amarus (Schumach. & Thonn.) Leandri; Diasperus nanus (Hook.f.) Kuntze; Phyllanthus amarus var. baronianus Leandri; Phyllanthus amarus subsp. sanyaensis P.T.Li & Y.T.Zhu; Phyllanthus nanus Hook.f.; Phyllanthus niruri var. baronianus (Leandri) Leandri; Phyllanthus niruri var. scabrellus (Webb) Müll.Arg.; Phyllanthus niruroides var. madagascariensis Leandri; Phyllanthus scabrellus Webb; Phyllanthus swartzii Kostel.

= Phyllanthus amarus =

Species of flowering plant

Phyllanthus amarus is a species of plant in the family Phyllanthaceae. It is native to Mexico, the Caribbean, and Central and South America, but has been introduced to most other tropicals areas in the world. Common names for this plant include gale of the wind, carry me seed, seed on the leaf, pick-a-back, stonebreaker, and dukung anak (Malay).

== Description ==
Phyllanthus amarus is a small, annual herb that grows to a height of 30–60 cm. Its thin branches spread out, and each branch has two rows of small, elliptic-oblong leaves of 5-10mm long that are arranged alternately. Its radial flowers are star-shaped and of about 2mm in size. It grows well in soil of high moisture with light shade, and reaches maturity in 2–3 months.

== Constituents ==
Phyllanthus amarus contains flavonoids (quercetin-3-0-glucoside and rutin), tannins (geraniin, amariin and gallocatechin), and alkaloids (phyllantine, quinolizidine type, securinine, norsecurinine, isobubbialine and epibubbialine).

== Uses ==
Phyllanthus amarus has been used in the traditional medicine of various cultures, including Amazonian tribes, Ayurveda and Sinhala folk medicine.

== Gallery ==
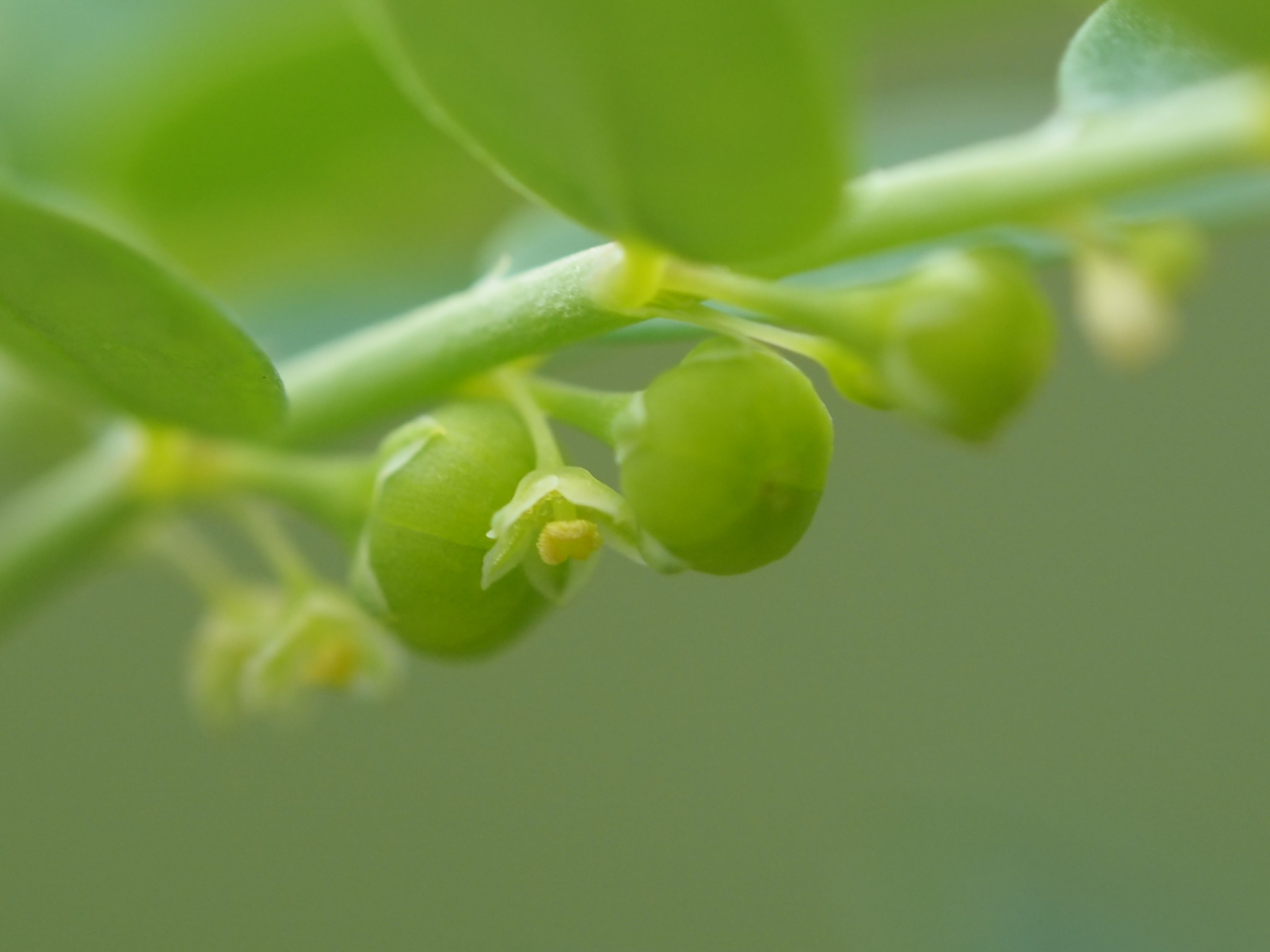
fruit

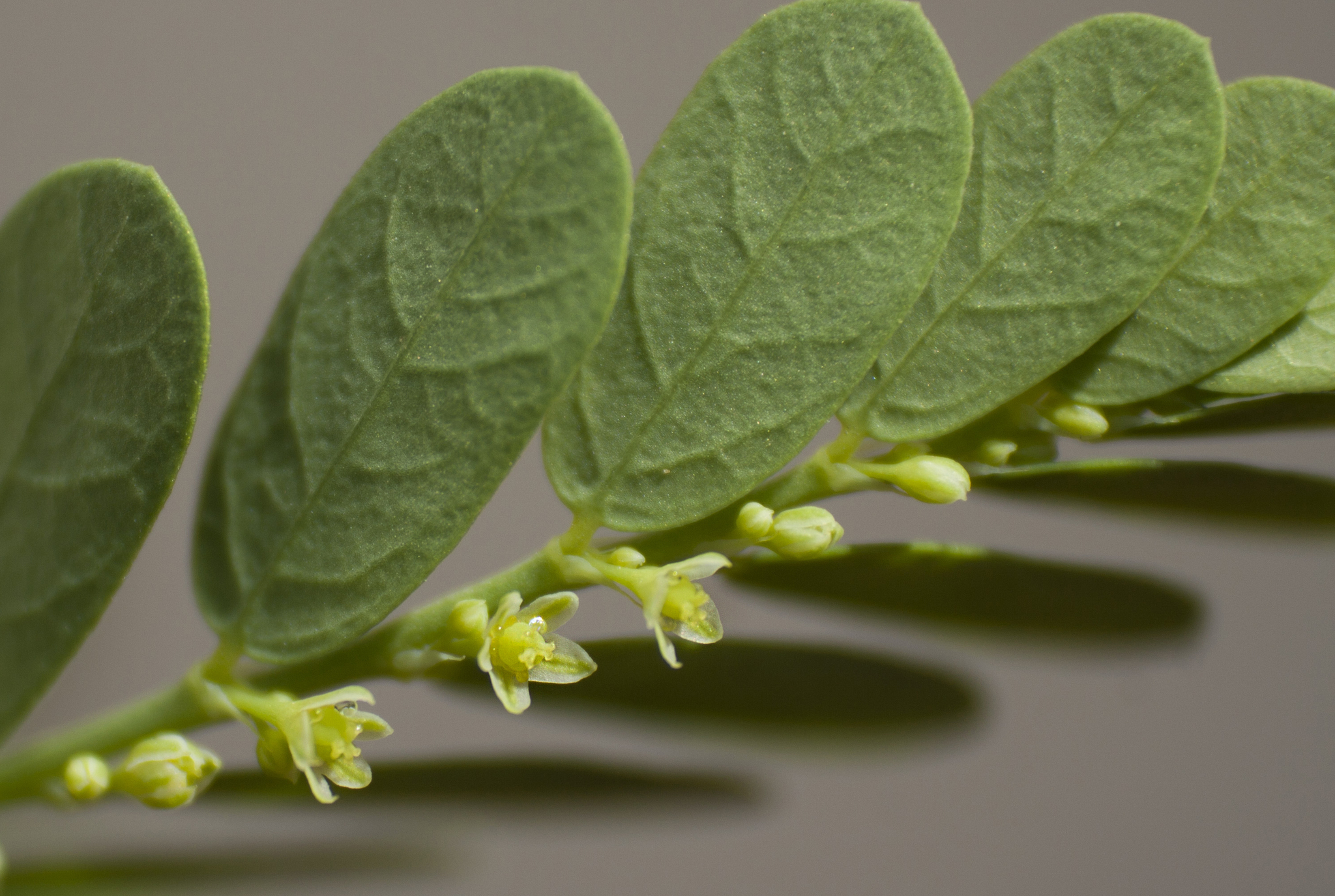
flowers
