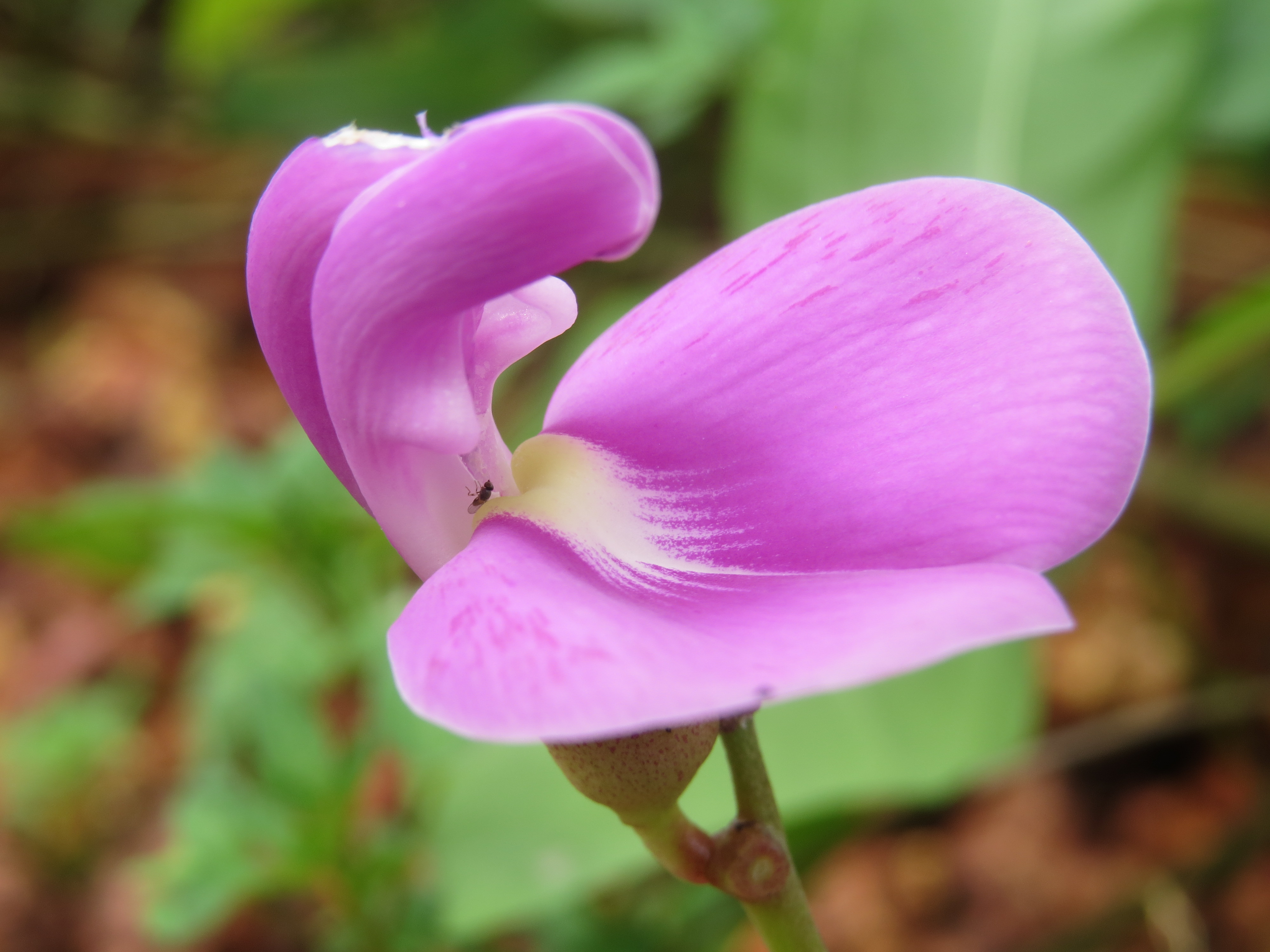

Conservation status
- Least Concern (IUCN 3.1)

Scientific classification
- Kingdom: Plantae
- Clade: Tracheophytes
- Clade: Angiosperms
- Clade: Eudicots
- Clade: Rosids
- Order: Fabales
- Family: Fabaceae
- Subfamily: Faboideae
- Genus: Canavalia
- Species: C. rosea

Binomial name
- Canavalia rosea (Sw.) DC.

Synonyms
- Canavalia maritima Thouars; Canavalia obtusifolia DC. Clitoria rotundifolia Sessé & Moc. Dolichos maritimus Aubl. Dolichos obtusifolius Lam. Dolichos roseus Sw. Dolichos rotundifolius Vahl; Mucuna mutilans DC. Rhynchosia rosea DC.

= Canavalia rosea =

Coastal jack-bean

Species of legume

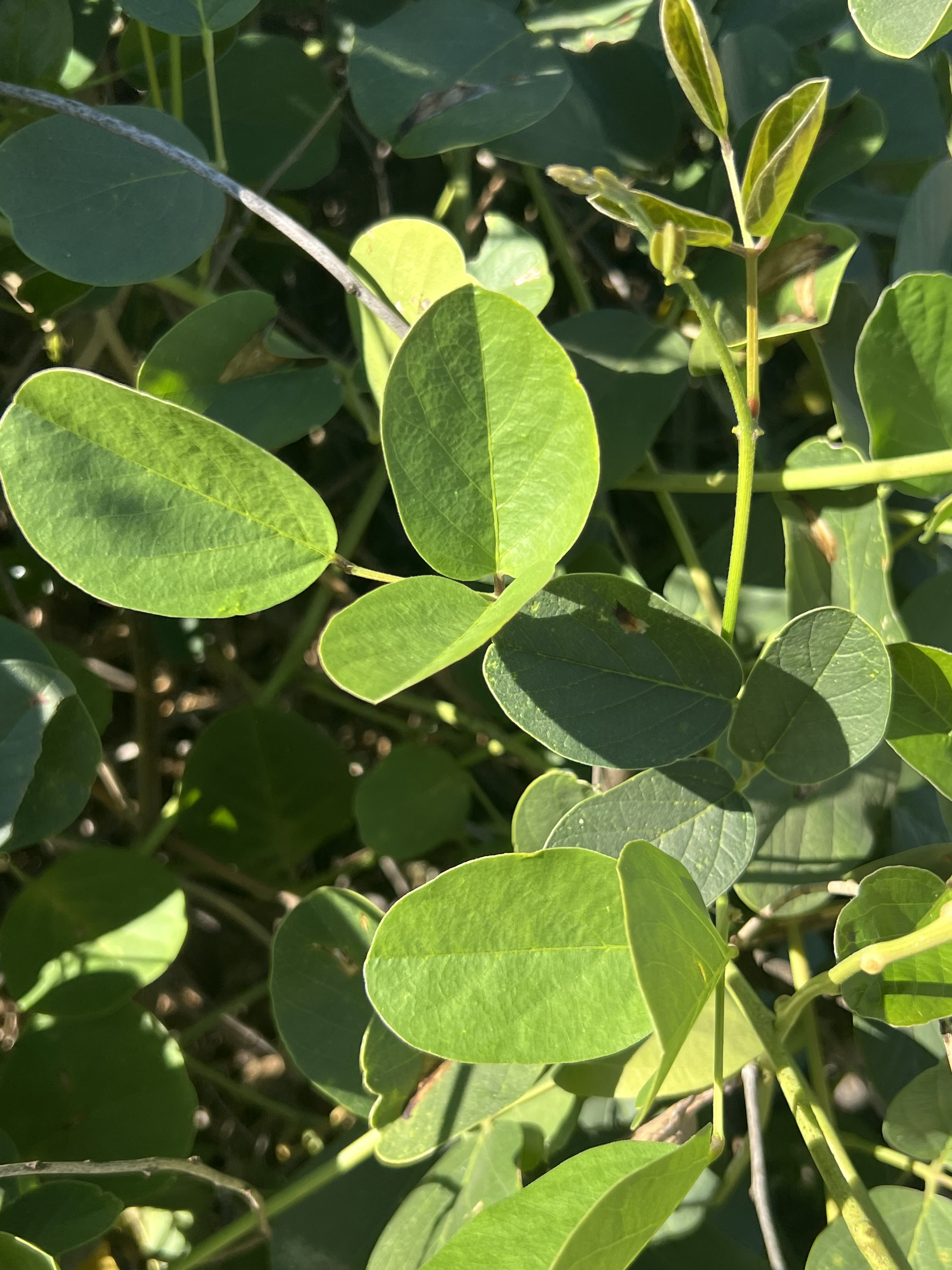
Foliage

Canavalia rosea is a species of flowering plant of the genus Canavalia in the pea family of Fabaceae, it has a pantropical and subtropical distribution in upper beaches, cliffs, and dunes. Common names include beach bean, bay bean, sea bean, greater sea bean, seaside jack-bean, coastal jack-bean, and MacKenzie bean.

== Description ==
=== Vine ===
Coastal jack-bean is a trailing, herbaceous vine that forms mats of foliage. Stems reach a length of more than 6 m (20 ft) and 2.5 cm (0.98 in) in thickness. Each compound leaf is made up of three leaflets 3.0–15.0 cm (1.2–5.9 in) in diameter, which will fold themselves when exposed to hot sunlight. It is highly salt-tolerant and prefers sandy soils.

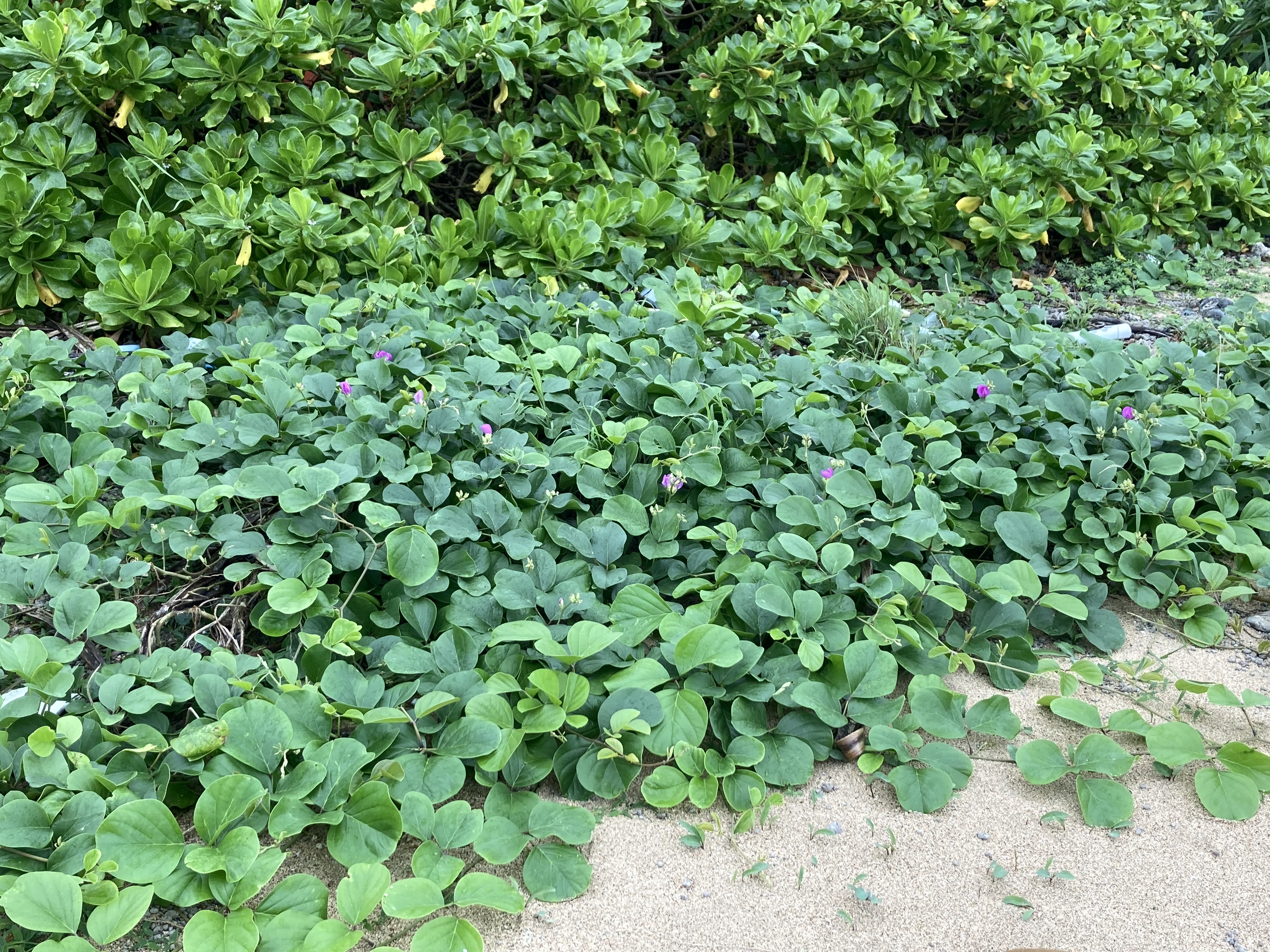
Canavalia rosea on the beaches of Ishigaki Island

=== Flowers and pods ===
The flowers are purplish pink and 2.5–5.1 cm (0.98–2.01 in) long, they hang upside down from long stalks and produce a sweet smell. The flat pods are straight or a little curved, 6.0–15.2 cm (2.4–6.0 in) long, their skin becoming prominently ridged as they mature. Each pod has between 2–10 brown seeds. The seeds are buoyant so they can be distributed by ocean currents. The plant seems to contain L-Betonicine. The Canavalia rosea plant fruits and blooms all year long.

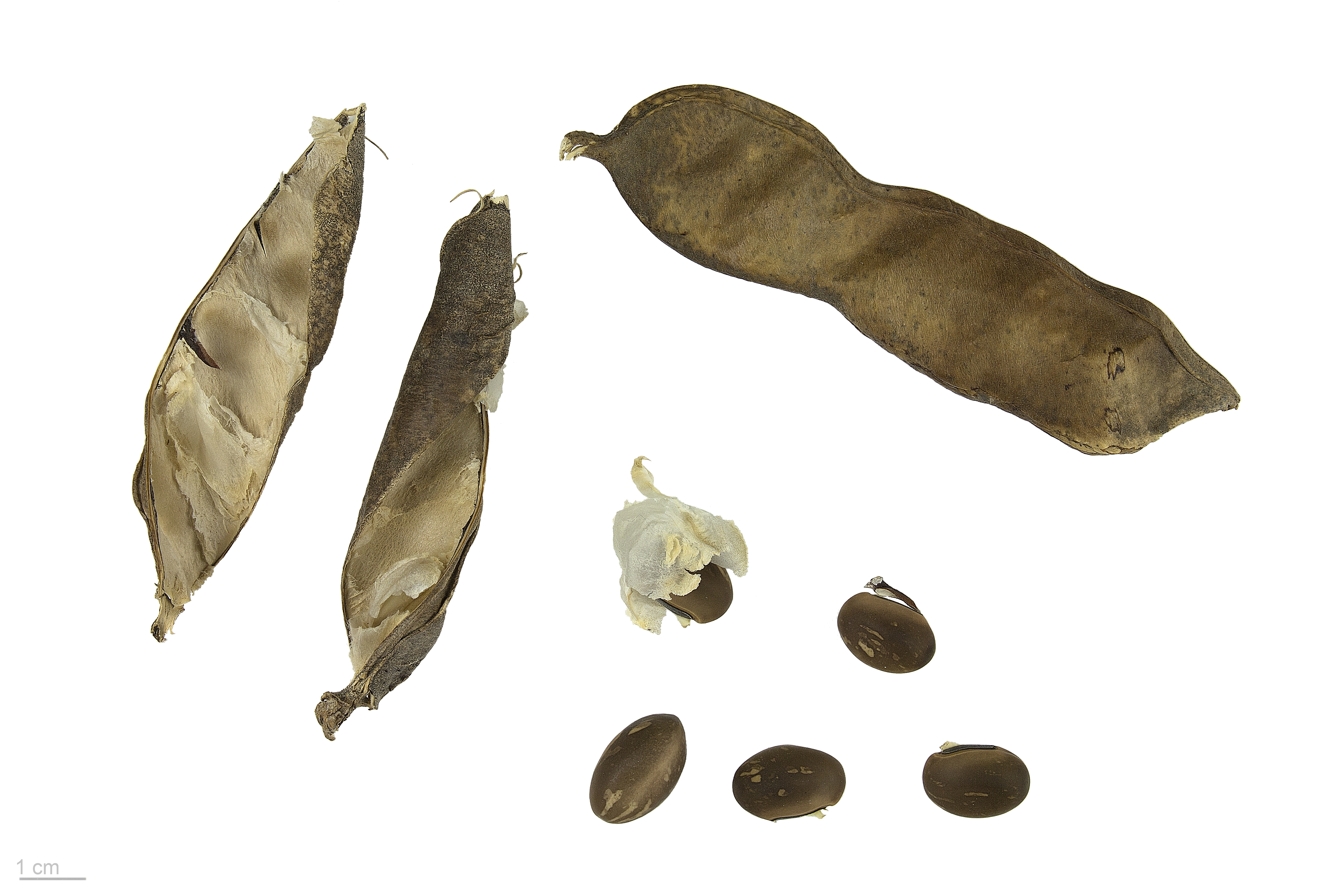
C. rosea pods and seeds

== Uses ==
Young seeds and pods are edible, especially after boiling. The flowers can be made into a spice.

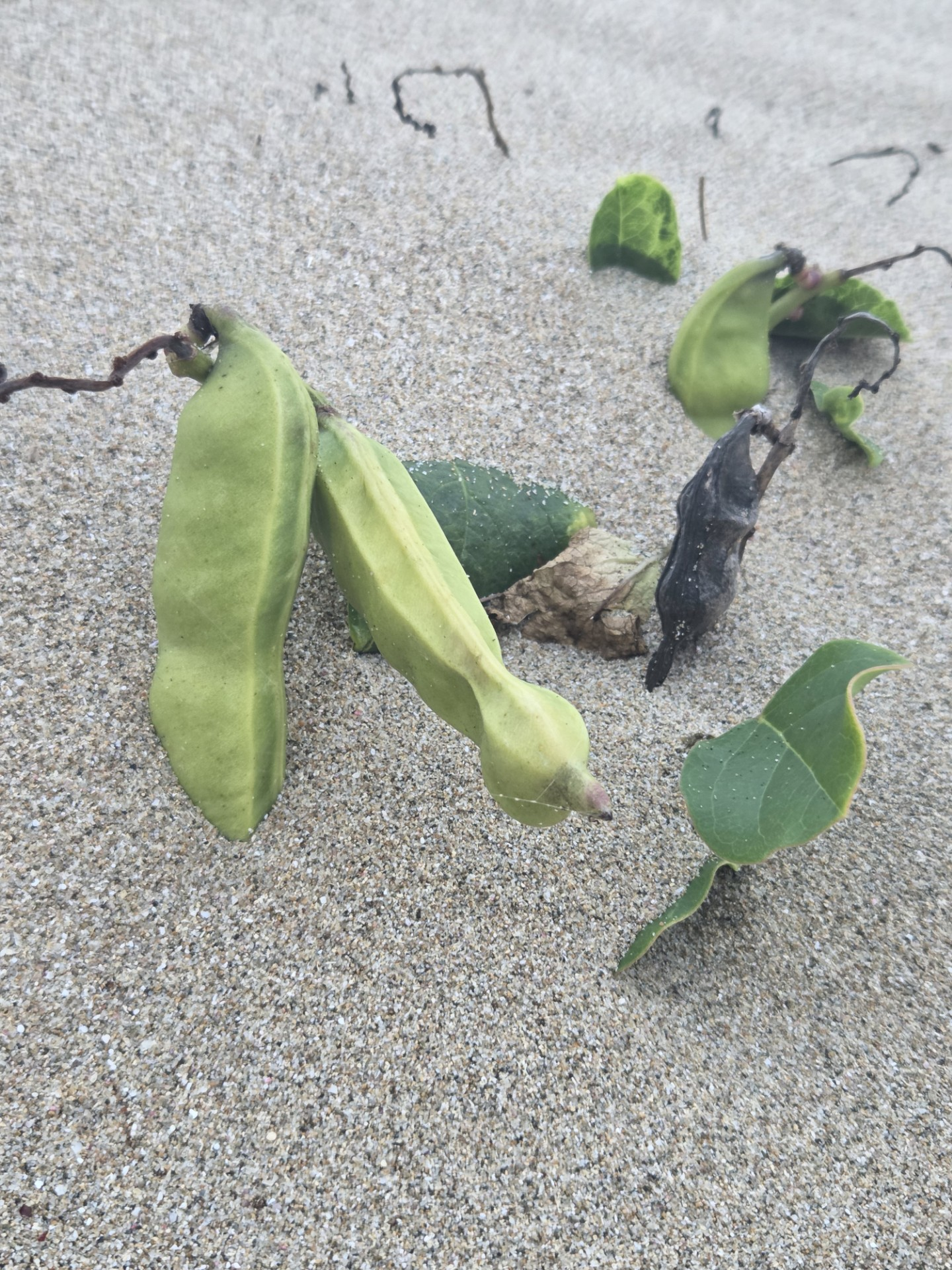
Canavalia rosea immature bean pods becoming submerged in sand at Isabela, Puerto Rico sand dunes
