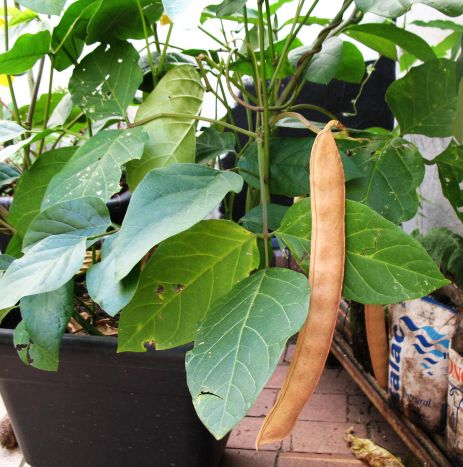

Scientific classification
- Kingdom: Plantae
- Clade: Tracheophytes
- Clade: Angiosperms
- Clade: Eudicots
- Clade: Rosids
- Order: Fabales
- Family: Fabaceae
- Subfamily: Faboideae
- Genus: Canavalia
- Species: C. ensiformis

Binomial name
- Canavalia ensiformis (L.) DC.

= Canavalia ensiformis =

Species of legume

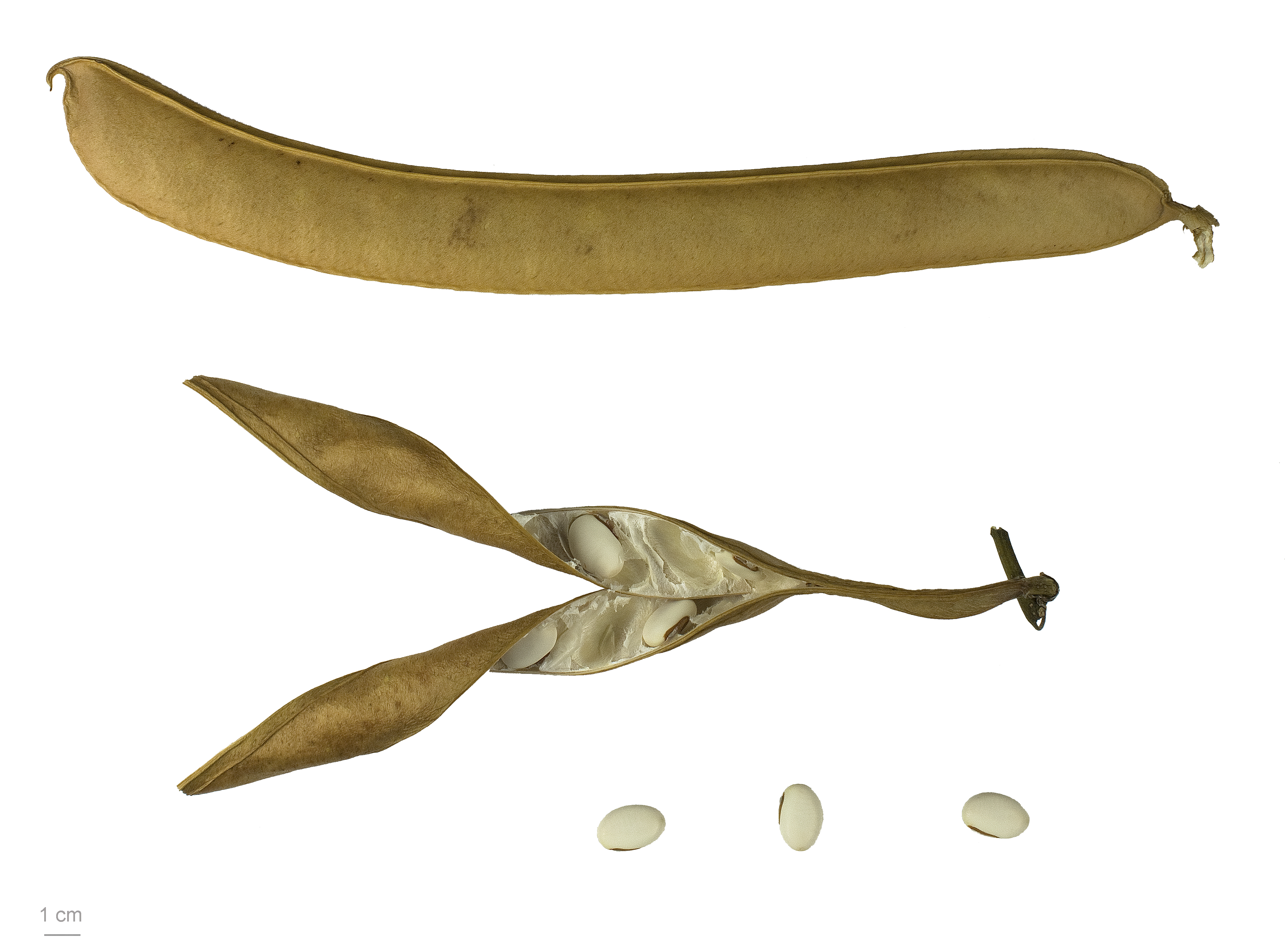
Canavalia ensiformis MHNT

Canavalia ensiformis (jack bean) is a legume which is used for animal fodder and human nutrition, especially in Brazil where it is called feijão-de-porco ("pig bean"). It is also the source of concanavalin A.

== Description ==
C. ensiformis is a twining plant up to 1 metre (3.3 ft) in height. It has deep roots, which makes it drought resistant. The plant can spread via long runners. The flowers are pink-purple in colour. The pods are up to 36 centimetres (14 in) long with large white seeds.

== Uses ==
Historically, it was used by native tribes for food and forage in droughty regions of Arizona and Mexico. Now, while commonly consumed in Asia and Japan, C. ensiformis seem to be unpopular elsewhere. The beans are mildly toxic, and copious consumption should be avoided. Boiling will, however, remove toxicity if done properly. Young foliage is also edible. The whole plant is used for fodder, although it cannot be used in fodder mixtures containing urea, since it contains large quantities of the enzyme urease, which liberates harmful ammonia from urea. For this reason C. ensiformis has been investigated as a potential source of the urease enzyme. It is also the source of concanavalin A, a lectin used in biotechnology applications, such as lectin affinity chromatography.

As a garden plant, it can grow to over 2 metres (6.6 ft), provided it gets enough nutrients, rich soil, sun and warmth. It grows therefore in rich soil, or use extra nutrients, in a sunny warm place.

== Names ==
C. ensiformis has numerous names in English. They include many that are misleading or ambiguous, being derived from comparing the common jack bean to plants with similar seeds or fruit: they thrive in warm, sunny, places with much water or rain.

- Brazilian broad bean
- "Coffee bean"
- Chickasaw lima bean
- Ensiform bean
- "Horse bean" (usually applied to Vicia faba)
- "Jack bean" (also applied to other species in the genus Canavalia)
- Mole bean
- Overlook bean
- Pearson bean
- "Sword bean" (usually applied to Canavalia gladiata)
- Wonder bean
