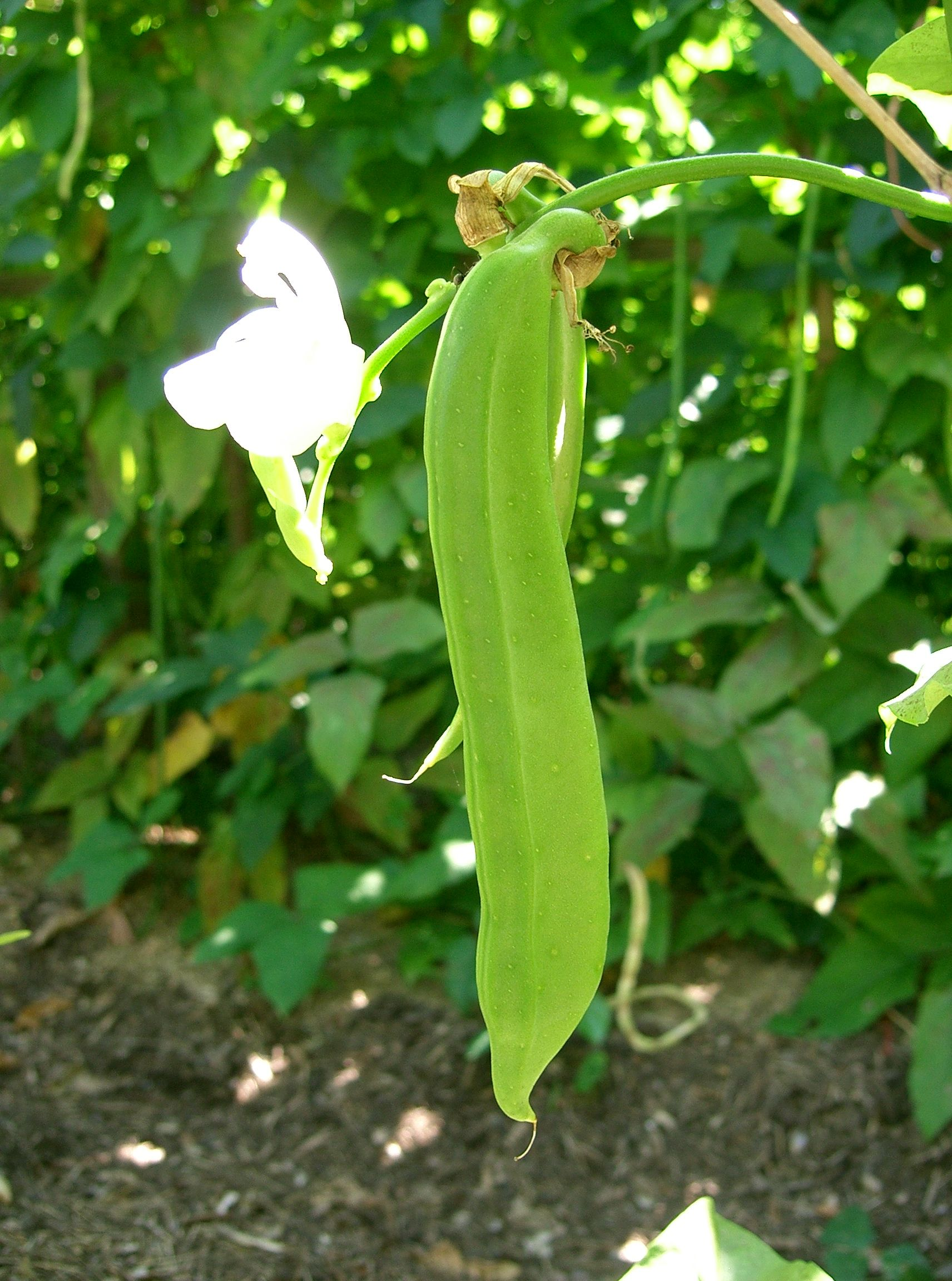

Scientific classification
- Kingdom: Plantae
- Clade: Embryophytes
- Clade: Tracheophytes
- Clade: Spermatophytes
- Clade: Angiosperms
- Clade: Eudicots
- Clade: Rosids
- Order: Fabales
- Family: Fabaceae
- Subfamily: Faboideae
- Genus: Canavalia
- Species: C. gladiata

Binomial name
- Canavalia gladiata (Jacq.) DC.

= Canavalia gladiata =

Sword bean

Species of flowering plant

Canavalia gladiata, the sword bean or scimitar bean, is a domesticated plant species in the legume family Fabaceae. It is used as a vegetable in interior central and south central India, though not commercially farmed. The unripe pods are also eaten as a vegetable in Africa and Asia.

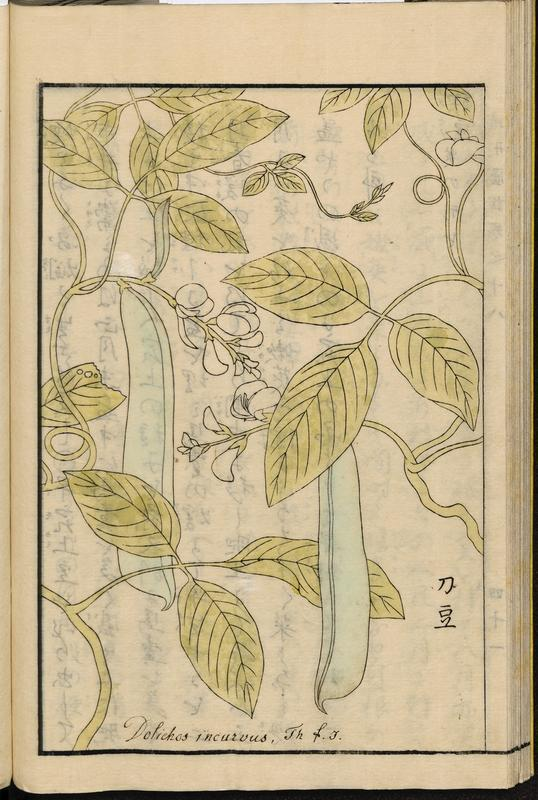
From the Japanese agricultural encyclopedia Seikei Zusetsu (1804)

The term "sword bean" is also used for other legumes, notably the common jack bean Canavalia ensiformis.

== Description ==
=== Appearance and Leaves ===
Sword beans are a climbing, herbaceous vine that can reach lengths of up to 10 meters (33 ft) under optimal conditions.

=== Inflorescence and Flowers ===
The inflorescence is a raceme bearing 10 to 20 flowers, which are either white or light purple. Each flower measures approximately 3 cm (1.2 in) in length.

=== Fruits and Seeds ===
The fruits are shaped as long, straight, slightly compressed pods, measuring 20–40 cm (8–16 in), up to 60 cm (24 in) with a rough surface. Each pod contains 8 to 16 seeds, which are oblong-ellipsoid, variable in color, ranging from red and red-brown to white or black. The hilum is dark brown and extends the full length of the seed.

== Origin ==
Canavalia gladiata is believed to have come from the Old World, probably in eastern Asia, where domestication likely started. Still today, sword beans are widely distributed in those regions. Sword beans are most commonly cultivated in the south, southeast, and east Asia. It is also common in Saudi Arabia, East Africa, South Africa, and Madagascar. Historically, its primary use was for food and traditional medicine.

== Taxonomy ==
The genus Canavalia includes about 60 species, two of which are cultivated for food, cover crop, green manure and medicine: jack beans (Canavalia ensiformis (L.) DC.) and sword beans (C. gladiata (Jacq.) DC).

Sword beans are originally described as Dolichos gladiatus by Jaquin in 1788. In 1825, Augustin-Pyrame de Candolle published the species as Canavalia gladiata (Jacq.) DC., which is the scientific name currently used for sword bean. Over time sword beans have been known by several names based on varying classifications (see list of synonymes below).

=== Synonymes ===
- Canavalia ensiformis auct. non (L.) DC.
- Canavalia ensiformis (L.) DC. var. gladiata (Jacq.) Kuntze
- Canavalia ensiformis var. alba Makino
- Canavalia ensiformis DC. var. gladiata Makino
- Canavalia gladiolata Sauer
- Canavalia incurva (Thunb.) DC.
- Canavalia incurva Thou.
- Canavalia loureirii G. Don
- Canavalia lunareti Carr.
- Canavalia machaeroides (DC.) Steud.
- Canavalia maxima Thou.
- Dolichos gladiatus Jacquin
- Dolichos incurvus Thunb.
- Malocchia gladiata (Jacq.) Savi.

== Cultivation ==
Sword beans can be found from sea level up to 900 m (3,000 ft) elevation. They need temperatures between 20 and 30 °C (68 and 86 °F) to grow and about 900–1,500 mm (35–59 in) evenly distributed rainfall per year.

The average yield of sword beans can reach 720–1500 kg/ha. To be used as vegetable, the pods are harvested after 3 to 5 months of growth, when they are about 12.5 to 15 cm long, before the seeds swell and become hard. For the seeds to mature about 6 to 10 months of growth are needed.

Sword beans can tolerate a wide range of soil types with a pH between 4.3–6.8. It has a deep-rooted system and can survive drought conditions. The seeds are sown 2–3 cm (0.8–1.2 in) deep with 45–60 cm (18–24 in) distance between plants within a row. Row spacing is around 75–90 cm (30–35 in).

=== Diseases ===
Sword beans are relatively resistant to diseases and pests. A major disease affecting sword beans is Anthracnose, which is caused by fungal pathogens of Colletotrichum species. Severe lesions can be found both on the stem and leaves.

Research has also shown that Bean Common Mosaic Virus (BCMV) can infect the sword bean. Previously it has been known to infect several legumes and cause some of the most economically important diseases on legume crops. BCMV could gain importance in sword bean production in the future, if sword bean is grown more widely as BCMV is reported to cause major yield losses in legumes.

== Nutritional Composition and Toxicity ==
=== Nutritional Composition ===
Dried sword beans are a highly nutritious wild legume, notable for their high protein content on a dry weight basis. Each 100g of seed flour provides 59g of carbohydrates, 24.5g of protein, and 2.6g of fat, along with 7.4g of fiber, while retaining 10.7g of moisture. This nutrient profile delivers an energy value of 1,453 kJ per 100g.

=== Mineral Content ===
The beans are also rich in minerals, containing 109.3 mg of sodium, 1639.5 mg of potassium, 510.1 mg of calcium, 480.9 mg of magnesium, and 601.2 mg of phosphorus. Additionally, trace minerals are present, including 10.9 mg of iron, 0.8 mg of copper, 6.6 mg of zinc, and 2.2 mg of manganese.

=== Nutritional value per 100 g ===
Component	Fresh Sword Bean Pods (per 100 g)	Dry Seeds (per 100 g)
Water	83.6 g	10.7 g
Energy	247 kJ (59 kcal)	1,453 kJ (347 kcal)
Protein	4.6 g	24.5 g
Fat	0.4 g	2.6 g
Carbohydrate	10.7 g	59 g
Dietary Fiber	2.6 g	7.4 g
Calcium	33 mg	158 mg
Phosphorus	66 mg	298 mg
Iron	1.2 mg	7.0 mg
Vitamin A	40 IU	-
Thiamin	0.2 mg	0.8 mg
Riboflavin	0.1 mg	1.8 mg
Niacin	2 mg	-
Ascorbic Acid (Vitamin C)	32 mg	1 mg

=== Toxicity ===
Despite nutritional potential in terms of protein content sword beans are not used as food. This is partly due to the presence of harmful factors such as haemagglutinis (concanavalin A), protease inhibitors, hydrocyanic acid, tannins, phytates and canavanine. Canavanine is contained in the seeds of the plants (the content is 10–13%). It interferes with protein synthesis and has a nutrition-inhibiting effect on animals and humans. Soaking overnight and boiling in excess water followed by decanting resulted in the greatest reduction in canavanine content (approx. 50%), followed by boiling and decanting in excess water (34%).

== Uses ==
=== Food ===
Records of food usage can be found in multiple countries. Multiple methods were developed to deal with the antinutritive components of sword beans.

Young leaves, flowers, tender green pods and seeds are edible after cooking. The young pods are sliced and cooked or eaten raw. Young seeds are edible after cooking, and the mature seeds are as well, but only after prolonged cooking. In Japan, the young, tender pods are processed into several kinds of pickles called "Fukujin-zuke", "Nuka-zuke", and "Miso-zuke". In Java, the de-skinned and twice-boiled seeds are left in running water for 2 days, allowed to ferment for 3–4 days and cooked before being eaten as flavouring. After steaming, they also use young leaves and flowers as flavoring.

In Cuba, seeds are used as a substitute for coffee. Multiple countries use it as part of their traditional medicine. In India, the sword bean was a staple of ancient food practices but is less popular nowadays. Sword bean is one of the legumes used in Ghana for inexpensive, nutritive meals.

=== Feed ===
Fewer information about historical use as feed is available. However, two recent studies investigated its potential as such.

Sword bean nutritive value was investigated for rats' nutrition. A diet made exclusively of raw sword bean seeds proved to have a negative effect on weight gain compared to a reference diet. However, this negative effect was decreased when beans were processed to decrease their toxicity.

Another study investigated whether it could partly replace soybeans in broilers' diets. Results showed that replacing 30% of soybean with processed sword bean did not result in any adverse effect on broilers' health and growth. Additionally, its foliage provides a good leaf meal for use in animal feeds.

=== Traditional medicine ===
Multiple countries have used sword beans in their traditional medicine. In Korea, it is thought to help with many ailments such as vomiting, abdominal dropsy, kidney-related lumbago, asthma, obesity, stomach-ache, dysentery, coughs, headache, intercostal neuralgia, epilepsy, schizophrenia, inflammatory diseases, and swelling. Additionally, sword bean extract is used in soap to treat athlete's foot and acne.

In Japan, it was also used for ozena, haemorrhoids, pyorrhea, otitis media, boils, cancers, inflammatory diseases and atopic dermatitis.

In Peninsular Malaysia, the leaves were used by the Malays to treat gonorrhoea. The leaves were used with other substances in a tonic that was squeezed into the eyes. The plant was pounded and applied to boils. The seeds were also used medicinally.

It is also used in Tibetan medicine in combination with other plants.

The Hakka people of China use the sword bean root in their traditional medicine as a decoction against knee pain (genu arthralgia).

Current scientific studies have proved that sword bean has medically valuable actions such as being an antioxidant, anti-cancer, anti-HIV, vasodilator, and anti-osteoporosis.

=== Green manure ===
Canavalia gladiata is often grown as a cover crop, as green manure (due to its nitrogen-fixing ability) and as forage crop.
