= The Call of the Wild (2007 film) =

Documentary by Ron Lamothe

Call of the Wild
- DVD cover
- Directed by: Ron Lamothe
- Written by: Ron Lamothe
- Produced by: Ron Lamothe
- Starring: Thomas Clausen; Will Forsberg; Leonard Knight
- Music by: Mark Zaki
- Production company: Terra Incognita Productions
- Release date: September 29, 2007 (United States)
- Running time: 115 minutes
- Country: United States
- Language: English

The Call of the Wild is a 2007 documentary film by the independent filmmaker Ron Lamothe. The premise details the odyssey of Christopher McCandless as Lamothe takes a road trip across North America to the places McCandless visited. Within the film, Lamothe reaches conclusions about McCandless' death which contradict both Sean Penn's film Into the Wild (2007) and Jon Krakauer's book Into the Wild (1996), on which Penn's film was based.

== Content ==
In 2006, Ron Lamothe, decided to make a road trip documentary on Christopher McCandless. Lamothe was inspired by McCandless' story even before the book Into the Wild (1996) was published, as both he and McCandless were born in 1968 and graduated from college in 1990. They also shared the same roommate at one time in their lives, and Lamothe took a life-changing trip to Africa during the same time as McCandless' travels.

After a brief swim in Walden Pond, Lamothe begins his journey to Annandale, Virginia, where McCandless grew up and went to high school. Lamothe then journeys to Emory University in Atlanta, Georgia, where McCandless graduated in May 1990, and attends the 2006 graduation ceremony. Also attending the ceremony is filmmaker Sean Penn, who coincidentally was then filming a major motion picture about McCandless. Lamothe interviews a few graduates on their plans after college in hopes of finding a "McCandless" in the crowd while comparing the graduates to the free-spirited Generation X.

On June 3, Lamothe and a friend travel to Lake Mead and discuss the casting choice of Emile Hirsch as McCandless in the upcoming film. They incidentally pass through Penn's production as he sees two yellow Datsun B-210 props, the same car McCandless drove and later lost during a flash flood. Lamothe has the entire Lake Mead to himself without being bothered by Penn's crew, who chose to film in a different location.

Lamothe then ventures to California and visits Slab City, where McCandless had stayed during the Christmas holidays in 1991. Lamothe tours Salvation Mountain and interviews Leonard Knight, who built the site and claims to have met McCandless during McCandless' stay.

Lamothe then decides to visit Carthage, South Dakota, where McCandless took on a job working at a grain elevator in September 1990 and in April 1992. Like McCandless, Lamothe travels to Carthage solely by hitchhiking. Lamothe travels through Colorado with an ex-drug dealer—who used to live in Alaska-and along I-80 through Nebraska to Council Bluffs, Iowa with a group of young adults who enjoy collecting mushrooms alongside the road. After days of hitchhiking, Lamothe finally makes it to Carthage but learns that no one in the town will take interviews for his documentary, since they are under contract by Paramount Vantage for Penn's film. However, Lamothe does get to interview the truck driver who gave McCandless a ride from Carthage to Enderlin, North Dakota, as his life story was not owned by Paramount.

After departing Carthage, Lamothe travels through Canada but this time as the driver. He agrees to pick up any hitchhiker he sees but unfortunately doesn't find any along the way.

Finally, Lamothe arrives in Fairbanks, Alaska, where he interviews a few locals at a bar who only have criticisms about McCandless. Lamothe sets out on the Stampede Trail on foot, but when he tries to cross the Teklanika River, his camera becomes damaged, leading him to think his film is ruined. However, unknown to Lamothe, his camera is fine as he attempts to film as much of Bus 142 (where McCandless died in August 1992) as possible. After a few nights at the bus, Lamothe travels back home to Massachusetts and returns to his normal life.

=== New findings ===
Lamothe documents several later findings that contradict Krakauer's book and Penn's film. He reports that McCandless was not poisoned by wild potato seeds as Krakauer had suspected, as the toxicologist hired by Krakauer did not find any poisonous effects of the seeds. He concludes that McCandless was simply unable to forage enough food to feed himself and died of starvation.

However, in March 2015 Krakauer co-authored a scientific analysis of the Hedysarum alpinum seeds McCandless ate. The report found relatively high levels of L-canavanine (an antimetabolite toxic to mammals) in the H. alpinum seeds and concluded "it is highly likely that the consumption of H. alpinum seeds contributed to the death of Chris McCandless."

Lamothe also reveals that McCandless' driver's license, social security card and US$300 in cash were retrieved from a hidden pocket in McCandless' backpack, suggesting that McCandless intended to return from seclusion.

Lamothe further suspects that McCandless had an arm or shoulder injury not shown in the famous self-portrait photo by the bus, in which McCandless' shirt sleeve has the appearance of being empty. Lamothe believes, based on McCandless' S.O.S. note, that McCandless had injured his arm or dislocated his shoulder, and thus could not have swum across the Teklanika River to escape.

== Reception ==
The film screened October 8 and 9, 2007 as part of the San Francisco Documentary Film Festival, and the University of Alaska hosted the Fairbanks premiere of the film December 10, 2007.

The Denver Film Society offered that the film mounted "a thoughtful challenge to Jon Krakauer's Into the Wild (and actor-director Sean Penn's screen adaptation thereof), The Call of the Wild presents an alternative to the popular account of Chris McCandless, the self-styled 'aesthetic voyager' who died alone in the Alaskan wilderness in 1992 at age 24." They further noted Lamothe's, while filming, having several "run-ins" with Penn who was, in the same time-frame and locations, himself involved in the making of a production about McCandless, and made note of how Penn's production had "the clout to thwart Lamothe at many a turn." They concluded: "ultimately, however, what lies at the film's core is Lamothe's own journey of discovery. The conceit allows him to explore the concept of wilderness and its influence on the American psyche, as well as its reflection on our cultural landscape; the generation gap as measured by changing rites of passage; and the disparity between independent and Hollywood filmmaking."

British film critic Neil Young wrote that the film was a "disarmingly fresh, utterly engrossing documentary" in how it addressed "specific details of McCandless's controversial life (and even more controversial demise)" by director Ron Lamothe covering "a surprisingly expansive amount of geographic and thematic terrain as he journeys cross-county – driving, then hitchhiking – in McCandless's footsteps." In watching the production, Young offered "the film becomes not so much about McCandless or Lamothe (though it's certainly to some degree a portrait of both) but a more general rumination on the ambitions and limitations of the generation to which both belonged (the picture is part-dedicated to 'Generation X') and also a celebration of rural America's more eccentric backwaters."

Suite101 compares the different media depicting McCandless' journey and death. They note Sean Penn's version makes McCandless into a societal hero who burns his identity and money in a personal quest to exile himself from the material demands and obligations of modern society. They feel that although slightly different, the depictions by Krakauer and Lamothe were more down-to-Earth, and note that while Krakauer's version has McCandless divest himself of all identification, Lamothe's version attempted to be more accurate in its revealing that McCandless' wallet was discovered inside the wreckage of the bus, and that it contained his social security card, birth certificate, driver's licence, health card, map, and even library card, as well as $300 cash.

Juneau Empire wrote that release of the Krakauer book and the Penn and Lamothe films "cemented the mystique of Christopher McCandless" and there has been an increase of visitors coming to Alaska to retrace his steps. They also reported that 25 miles east of the site of the wrecked bus, residents of Healy, Alaska, feared the influx of unprepared visitors "making dangerous pilgrimages for a character portrayed as a spiritual visionary rather than an ill-prepared misfit, as many Alaskans view McCandless." While the wrecked 1940s-era International Harvester bus had been used for decades as a shelter by hunters, hikers, and other backwoods travelers, there is an area-wide worry about the safety of unprepared visitors "who are determined to make it to the bus no matter what."

SFist wrote that while the film's first half appears to be more about Ron Lamothe and less about Christopher McCandless, the "documentary gets good at the end and there are some interesting theories and revelations (the popular theory that McCandless died from poison seeds/berries is refuted)", and the film could have used better editing. They also felt that the amount of time Lamothe spent documenting the people who picked him up while he hitchhiked in a manner emulating McCandless', was "a use of screen time that seems beyond self-indulgent."

Kentucky Educational Television made note that, through the following of Christopher McCandless' footsteps, Ron Lamothe's film "uncovers never-before-seen evidence that sheds new light on the case, and the mystery surrounding his death", directly contradicting Jon Krakauer's interpretations in the book Into the Wild and those made in Sean Penn's film adaption of Krakauer's book.
