= Into the Wild (Krakauer book) =

1996 nonfiction book by Jon Krakauer

- Cover of paperback, depicting the bus in which McCandless stayed.
- Author: Jon Krakauer
- Language: English
- Genre: Biography/True travel essay
- Publisher: Villard
- Publication date: January 13, 1996
- Publication place: United States
- Pages: 224
- ISBN: 0-679-42850-X
- OCLC: 35559213
- Dewey Decimal: 917.9804/5 20
- LC Class: CT9971.M38 K73 1997
- Preceded by: Eiger Dreams
- Followed by: Into Thin Air

Into the Wild is a 1996 non-fiction book written by Jon Krakauer. It is an expansion of a 9,000-word article by Krakauer on Chris McCandless titled "Death of an Innocent", which appeared in the January 1993 issue of Outside. The book was adapted into a film of the same name in 2007, directed by Sean Penn with Emile Hirsch starring as McCandless. Into the Wild is an international bestseller that has been printed in 30 languages and 173 editions and formats. The book is widely used in high-school and college reading curricula. Into the Wild has been lauded by many reviewers, and in 2019 was listed by Slate as one of the 50 best nonfiction works of the past quarter-century.

== Background ==
Christopher Johnson McCandless grew up in suburban Annandale, Virginia. After graduating in May 1990 with high grades from Emory University, McCandless ceased communicating with his family, gave away his college fund of $24,500 to Oxfam, and began traveling across the Western United States, later abandoning his 1982 Datsun B210 after a flash flood.

On April 28, 1992, McCandless hitchhiked to the Stampede Trail in Alaska. There he headed down the snow-covered trail to begin an odyssey with only 10 pounds (4500 g) of rice, a .22 caliber rifle, several boxes of rifle rounds, a camera, and a small selection of reading material—including a field guide to the region's edible plants, Tana'ina Plantlore. He declined an acquaintance's offer to buy him sturdier clothing and better supplies. McCandless died sometime around the week of August 18, 1992, after surviving for 113 days.

== Summary ==
On September 6, 1992, McCandless's body was found in an abandoned bus on the Stampede Trail in Alaska. One year later, author Jon Krakauer retraced McCandless's steps during the two years between college graduation and his demise in Alaska. McCandless shed his legal name early in his journey, adopting the moniker "Alexander Supertramp", after W.H. Davies. He spent time in Carthage, South Dakota, laboring for months in a grain elevator owned by Wayne Westerberg, before hitchhiking to Alaska in April 1992. Krakauer suggests that McCandless's intensely ascetic personality was influenced by the writings of Henry David Thoreau and McCandless's favorite writer, Jack London. He explores the similarities between McCandless's experiences and motivations, and his own as a young man, recounting in detail his own attempt to climb Devils Thumb in Alaska. He also relates the stories of some other young men who vanished into the wilderness, such as Everett Ruess and Carl McCunn. In addition, he describes at some length the grief and puzzlement of McCandless's parents, sister Carine, and friends.

=== Cause of death ===
McCandless survived for approximately 113 days in the Alaskan wilderness, foraging for edible roots and berries, shooting an assortment of game—including a moose—and keeping a journal. Although he planned to hike to the coast, the boggy terrain of summer proved too difficult, and he decided instead to live in a derelict camping bus left behind by a road construction company. In July he tried to leave, only to find the route blocked by the Teklanika River raging with snow-melt. On July 30, McCandless wrote a journal entry which read, "Extremely Weak. Fault Of Pot[ato] Seed". Based on this entry, Krakauer hypothesized that McCandless had been eating what he thought was the roots of an edible plant, Hedysarum alpinum, commonly known as wild Eskimo potato, which are sweet and nourishing in the spring but become too tough to eat in the summer, perhaps forcing McCandless to eat the H. alpinum's seeds instead. Krakauer first speculated that the seeds were actually from Hedysarum mackenzii, or wild sweet pea, instead of the Eskimo potato, which contained a poisonous alkaloid, possibly swainsonine (the toxic chemical in locoweed) or something similar. In addition to neurological symptoms, such as weakness and loss of coordination, the poison causes starvation by blocking nutrient metabolism in the body. However, Krakauer later suggested that McCandless had not confused the two plants and had in fact actually eaten H. alpinum. Krakauer had the H. alpinum seeds tested and it was found to contain an unidentifiable form of toxin.

According to Krakauer, a well-nourished person might consume the seeds and survive because the body can use its stores of glucose and amino acids to rid itself of the poison. Since McCandless lived on a diet of rice, lean meat, and wild plants and had less than 10% body fat when he died, Krakauer hypothesized that he was unable to fend off the toxins. However, when the Eskimo potatoes from the area around the bus were later tested in a laboratory of the University of Alaska Fairbanks by Dr. Thomas Clausen, toxins were not found. Krakauer later modified his hypothesis, suggesting that mold of the variety Rhizoctonia leguminicola may have caused McCandless's death. Rhizoctonia leguminicola is known to cause digestion problems in livestock, and may have contributed to McCandless's impending starvation. Krakauer hypothesised that the bag in which Chris kept the potato seeds was damp and the seeds thus became moldy. If McCandless had eaten seeds that contained this mold, he could have become sick, and Krakauer suggests that he thus became unable to get out of bed and starved. His basis for the mold hypothesis is a photograph that shows seeds in a bag. Following chemical analysis of the seeds, Krakauer now believes that the seeds themselves are poisonous.

In March 2015, Krakauer co-authored a scientific analysis of the Hedysarum alpinum seeds McCandless ate. The report found relatively high levels of L-canavanine (an antimetabolite toxic to mammals) in the H. alpinum seeds and concluded "it is highly likely that the consumption of H. alpinum seeds contributed to the death of Chris McCandless."

== Major themes ==
Into the Wild addresses the issues of how to be accepted into society, and how finding oneself sometimes conflicts with being an active member in society. Most critics agree that Chris McCandless left to find some sort of enlightenment. He also tries to find his way in the wild with minimal material possessions, because "it made the journey more enjoyable." His extreme risk-taking was the calling that eventually led to his downfall.

McCandless was influenced by transcendentalism and the need to "revolutionize your life and move into an entirely new realm of experience."

== Criticism ==
Despite its critical acclaim, the book's accuracy has been disputed by some of those involved in McCandless' story, and by some commentators such as Alaskan reporter Craig Medred. Medred covers a large number of items in the book that are questionable, most of which stem from the extremely limited detail in McCandless' journal. He concludes that Krakauer had to infer or invent much of McCandless' experiences. Krakauer was criticized for presenting his speculation as fact. Additionally, weather records refute some of the dramatic weather events presented in the story.

== Adaptations ==
A film adaptation was released in September 2007, directed by Sean Penn and starring Emile Hirsch as McCandless.

McCandless's story is also the subject of the documentary by Ron Lamothe named The Call of the Wild (2007). In his study of McCandless's death, Lamothe concludes that McCandless ran out of supplies and game, and starved to death, instead of being poisoned by eating the seeds of the wild potato.

The Christopher Johnson McCandless Memorial Foundation, headed by McCandless's parents Billie and Walt, with the editorial and writing input of family and friends, released the book and DVD Back to the Wild: The Photographs & Writings of Christopher McCandless (2010). The material includes hundreds of McCandless's previously unseen pictures and journal entries. Jon Krakauer has written a piece in the book's introduction, while Hal Holbrook—who appeared in the Penn film—narrates the DVD.

== Bus exhibit ==
The bus in which McCandless died became a tourist attraction after the book became popular. The bus was removed on June 18, 2020 due to tourists endangering themselves in the Alaskan wilderness. Members of the Alaska National Guard airlifted the bus to an undisclosed location, and then on September 24, 2020, the University of Alaska Museum of the North in Fairbanks announced the permanent display of the bus.
