= Into the Wild (film) =

2007 film by Sean Penn

- Theatrical release poster
- Directed by: Sean Penn
- Screenplay by: Sean Penn
- Based on: Into the Wild by Jon Krakauer
- Produced by: Sean Penn; Art Linson; Bill Pohlad
- Starring: Emile Hirsch; Marcia Gay Harden; William Hurt; Jena Malone; Catherine Keener; Brian H. Dierker; Vince Vaughn; Zach Galifianakis; Kristen Stewart; Hal Holbrook
- Cinematography: Eric Gautier
- Edited by: Jay Cassidy
- Music by: Michael Brook; Kaki King; Eddie Vedder
- Production companies: Paramount Vantage; River Road Entertainment; Square One C.I.H.; Linson Film
- Distributed by: Paramount Vantage
- Release date: September 21, 2007
- Running time: 148 minutes
- Country: United States
- Language: English
- Budget: $20 million
- Box office: $56.8 million

Into the Wild is a 2007 American biographical adventure drama film written, co-produced, and directed by Sean Penn. It is an adaptation of the 1996 non-fiction book written by Jon Krakauer and tells the story of Christopher McCandless ("Alexander Supertramp"), a man who hiked across North America into the Alaskan wilderness in the early 1990s. The film stars Emile Hirsch as McCandless, Hal Holbrook, and Catherine Keener.

The film premiered during the 2007 Rome Film Fest and opened outside Fairbanks, Alaska, on September 21, 2007 by Paramount Vantage. The film received positive reviews from critics and grossed $56.8 million against a $20 million budget.

== Plot ==
In April 1992, Chris McCandless arrives in a remote area called Healy, just north of Denali National Park and Preserve in Alaska. Noting McCandless's unpreparedness, the man who drops him off gives him gumboots.

McCandless sets up camp in an abandoned city bus that he calls "The Magic Bus". He is content with the isolation, the beauty of nature, and the thrill of living off the land. He hunts with a .22 rifle, reads books, and keeps a journal as he prepares his new life in the wild.

=== Flashback ===
In May 1990, McCandless graduates with high honors from Emory University. He is disenchanted with modern society after discovering he and his sister Carine were born out of wedlock.

McCandless destroys his credit cards and identification, donates his savings to Oxfam and sets out on a cross-country drive in his Datsun 210 to experience life in the wilderness. He does not tell his parents or Carine what he is doing or where he is going and does not contact them after his departure. This causes his parents to become increasingly anxious.

At Lake Mead, McCandless's car is caught in a flash flood; he abandons it and begins hitchhiking. Burning what remains of his cash, he assumes the name "Alexander Supertramp". In Northern California, McCandless encounters hippie couple Jan and Rainey. Rainey tells him his relationship with Jan is failing, which McCandless helps rekindle.

In September, McCandless arrives in Carthage, South Dakota, and works for a contract harvesting company owned by Wayne Westerberg. He leaves after Westerberg is arrested for satellite piracy.

McCandless kayaks down the Colorado River and, though told by park rangers he may not do so without a license, ignores their warnings and goes downriver to Mexico. His kayak is lost in a dust storm, and he crosses back into the United States on foot. Unable to hitch a ride, he jumps on freight trains to Los Angeles. Not long after arriving, however, he starts feeling "corrupted" by modern civilization and leaves. He is forced to resume hitchhiking when railroad police catch and beat him.

In December 1991, McCandless arrives at Slab City, California, in the Imperial Valley, and encounters Jan and Rainey again. He also meets Tracy Tatro, a teenage girl who shows interest in him, but he turns her down because she is a minor. After the holidays, McCandless continues heading for Alaska.

One month later, camping near Salton City, California, McCandless meets Ron Franz, a retired widower who lost his family in a car accident while he was serving in the United States Army. He leads a lonely life in a workshop as a leather worker. Franz teaches McCandless leatherwork, resulting in the making of a belt detailing his travels.

After two months with Franz, McCandless decides to leave for Alaska. Franz gives McCandless his old camping and travel gear, along with an offer to adopt him as his grandchild. McCandless tells him they should discuss it after he returns from Alaska.

=== Flashforward ===
Four months later, at the abandoned bus, life for McCandless becomes harder, and he makes several poor decisions. Trying to live off the land, he hunts down a large moose with his rifle, but cannot preserve the meat and it spoils within days. As his supplies dwindle, he realizes that nature can be harsh.

McCandless concludes that true happiness can be found only when shared with others, and he seeks to return from the wild to his friends and family. However, he finds that the stream he crossed during the winter has become wide, deep, and violent due to the thaw, and he is unable to cross. Defeated, he returns to the bus.

In a desperate act, McCandless gathers and eats roots and plants. He confuses similar plants and eats a poisonous one, falling sick as a result. Slowly dying, he continues to document his process of self-realization, and imagines what it might have been like if he had managed to return to his family. He writes a farewell note to the world and crawls into his sleeping bag to die.

Two weeks later, moose hunters find his body. Shortly afterwards, Carine returns to Virginia with her brother's ashes in her backpack.

== Cast ==
- Emile Hirsch as Chris McCandless a.k.a. Alexander Supertramp
- Marcia Gay Harden as Billie McCandless
- William Hurt as Walt McCandless
- Jena Malone as Carine McCandless
- Catherine Keener as Jan Burres
- Brian H. Dierker as Rainey
- Hal Holbrook as Ron Franz
- Kristen Stewart as Tracy Tatro
- Vince Vaughn as Wayne Westerberg
- Zach Galifianakis as Kevin
- Thure Lindhardt as Mads
- Signe Egholm Olsen as Sonja
- Merritt Wever as Lori
- Jim Gallien as Himself: Gallien is the truck driver who drove the real McCandless to Stampede Trail, and was the last person to see him alive.
- Leonard Knight as Himself
- R. D. Call as Bull
- Cheryl Harrington as social worker
- Bart the Bear 2 as The Bear

== Production ==
The scenes of graduation from Emory University in the film were shot in late 2006 on the front lawn of Reed College. Some of the graduation scenes were also filmed during the actual Emory University graduation on May 15, 2006. The Alaska scenes depicting the area around the abandoned bus on the Stampede Trail were filmed 50 miles (80 km) south of where McCandless actually died, in the tiny town of Cantwell. Filming at the actual bus would have been too remote for the technical demands of a movie shoot. A replica bus used in the movie is now a tourist attraction at a restaurant in Healy, Alaska.

Brian Dierker, who plays a major supporting role in the film as Rainey, had no previous acting experience and became involved in the production to be a guide for the rafting scenes.

== Release ==
=== Critical response ===
The review aggregator Rotten Tomatoes reports that 83% of 200 reviews of the film were positive, with an average rating of 7.50/10. The site's critics consensus reads: "With his sturdy cast and confident direction, Sean Penn has turned a complex work of nonfiction like Into the Wild into an accessible and poignant character study." Metacritic assigned the film an average score of 73 out of 100 based on 38 critics, indicating "generally favorable" reviews.

Roger Ebert of the Chicago Sun-Times gave the film four stars out of four and described it as "spellbinding". Ebert wrote that Emile Hirsch gives a "hypnotic performance", commenting: "It is great acting, and more than acting." Ebert added, "The movie is so good partly because it means so much, I think, to its writer-director, Sean Penn."

It received critical acclaim and grossed $56 million worldwide. It was nominated for two Golden Globes and won the award for Best Original Song: "Guaranteed" by Eddie Vedder. It was also nominated for two Academy Awards: Best Editing and Best Supporting Actor for Holbrook.

=== Accolades ===
Award	Date of ceremony	Category	Recipients	Result
Academy Awards	February 24, 2008	Best Supporting Actor	Hal Holbrook	Nominated
Academy Awards	February 24, 2008	Best Film Editing	Jay Cassidy	Nominated
Golden Globe Awards	January 13, 2008	Best Original Song – Motion Picture	"Guaranteed"	Won
Golden Globe Awards	January 13, 2008	Best Original Score – Motion Picture	Michael Brook, Kaki King, Eddie Vedder	Nominated
Critics' Choice Movie Awards	January 7, 2008	Best Film	Into the Wild	Nominated
Critics' Choice Movie Awards	January 7, 2008	Best Actor	Emile Hirsch	Nominated
Critics' Choice Movie Awards	January 7, 2008	Best Supporting Actor	Hal Holbrook	Nominated
Critics' Choice Movie Awards	January 7, 2008	Best Supporting Actress	Catherine Keener	Nominated
Critics' Choice Movie Awards	January 7, 2008	Best Director	Sean Penn	Nominated
Critics' Choice Movie Awards	January 7, 2008	Best Writer	Sean Penn	Nominated
Critics' Choice Movie Awards	January 7, 2008	Best Song	"Guaranteed"	Nominated
American Cinema Editors	February 17, 2008	Best Edited Feature Film – Dramatic	Jay Cassidy	Nominated
César Awards	February 27, 2009	Best Foreign Film	Into the Wild	Nominated
Chicago Film Critics Association Awards	December 13, 2007	Best Picture	Into the Wild	Nominated
Chicago Film Critics Association Awards	December 13, 2007	Best Screenplay – Adapted	Sean Penn	Nominated
Chicago Film Critics Association Awards	December 13, 2007	Best Supporting Actor	Hal Holbrook	Nominated
Cinema Audio Society	February 16, 2008	Outstanding Achievement in Sound Mixing for Motion Pictures		Nominated
Directors Guild of America Awards	January 26, 2008	Best Director – Film	Sean Penn	Nominated
Film Critics Circle of Australia Awards	February 1, 2008	Best Foreign Film – English Language	Sean Penn	Nominated
Gotham Awards	November 27, 2007	Best Feature Film	Into the Wild	Won
Gotham Awards	November 27, 2007	Breakthrough Actor	Emile Hirsch	Nominated
Grammy Awards	February 10, 2008	Best Song Written for Motion Picture, Television or Other Visual Media	"Guaranteed"	Nominated
Mill Valley Film Festival	October 14, 2007	Best Actor	Emile Hirsch	Won
National Board of Review	December 5, 2007	Breakthrough Performance – Male	Emile Hirsch	Won
Palm Springs International Film Festival	January 5, 2008	Director of the Year Award	Sean Penn	Won
Palm Springs International Film Festival	January 5, 2008	Rising Star Award Actor	Emile Hirsch	Won
Rome Film Festival	October 27, 2007	Jury Award	William Pohlad, Art Linson and Sean Penn	Won
São Paulo International Film Festival	November 1, 2007	Best Foreign Language Film	Sean Penn	Won
Satellite Awards	December 16, 2007	Best Original Song	"Rise"	Nominated
Screen Actors Guild Awards	January 27, 2008	Outstanding Performance by a Cast in a Motion Picture	The cast of Into the Wild	Nominated
Screen Actors Guild Awards	January 27, 2008	Outstanding Performance by a Male Actor in a Leading Role	Emile Hirsch	Nominated
Screen Actors Guild Awards	January 27, 2008	Outstanding Performance by a Male Actor in a Supporting Role	Hal Holbrook	Nominated
Screen Actors Guild Awards	January 27, 2008	Outstanding Performance by a Female Actor in a Supporting Role	Catherine Keener	Nominated
USC Scripter Award	February 2, 2008	USC Scripter Award	Sean Penn (screenwriter), Jon Krakauer (author)	Nominated
Writers Guild of America Awards	February 9, 2008	Best Adapted Screenplay	Sean Penn	Nominated

=== Top ten lists ===
The American Film Institute listed the film as one of ten AFI Movies of the Year for 2007.

National Board of Review named it one of the Top Ten Films of the Year.

Into the Wild also ranks 473rd in Empire magazine's 2008 list of the 500 greatest movies of all time.

The film appeared on many critics' top ten lists of the best films of 2007.

- 1st: Ben Lyons, The Daily 10
- 2nd: Ann Hornaday, The Washington Post
- 2nd: Tasha Robinson, The A.V. Club
- 3rd: James Berardinelli, ReelViews
- 3rd: Kevin Crust, Los Angeles Times
- 3rd: Peter Travers, Rolling Stone
- 4th: Kyle Smith, New York Post
- 5th: Claudia Puig, USA Today
- 5th: David Germain, Associated Press
- 5th: Joe Morgenstern, The Wall Street Journal
- 6th: Carrie Rickey, The Philadelphia Inquirer
- 6th: Steven Rea, The Philadelphia Inquirer
- 7th: A.O. Scott, The New York Times (tied with The Diving Bell and the Butterfly)
- 7th: Noel Murray, The A.V. Club
- 9th: Christy Lemire, Associated Press
- 10th: Roger Ebert, Chicago Sun-Times

=== Box office ===
In North America, Into the Wild initially opened in limited release in four theaters and grossed $212,440, posting a per-theater average of $53,110. For the next several weeks, the film remained in limited release until it expanded to over 600 theaters on October 19, 2007; in its first weekend of wide release, the film grossed just $2.1 million for a per-theater average of $3,249. As of December 25, 2008, the film grossed $18,354,356 domestically and $37,281,398 internationally. In total, the film grossed $55,635,754 worldwide.

=== Home media ===
Into the Wild was released on March 4, 2008, on standard DVD, Two-Disc Special Collector's Edition DVD, and standard HD DVD. The special edition DVD and HD DVD contain two special features entitled The Story, The Characters and The Experience. The Blu-ray Disc edition was released in France on July 16, 2008. The Blu-ray edition for the US was released on December 16, 2008.

== Soundtrack ==
The songs on the soundtrack were performed by Eddie Vedder, lead singer of Pearl Jam, and Jerry Hannan. Vedder won a Golden Globe for Best Original Song for the song "Guaranteed". The score was written and performed by Michael Brook and Kaki King. The music at the end of the theatrical trailer is "Acts of Courage" by X-Ray Dog, a company that supplies music for many movie trailers. Eddie Vedder said that while writing the songs on the album "I spent three days giving him (Sean Penn) colors that I could paint with. Different sounds. It would be pump organ and vocal, or it would be an uptempo song. I just gave him 25 minutes of music, stuff I felt that were colors on the palette. And I really didn't think anything was gonna come out of it. Maybe a little piece or something".

== Preserving the bus ==
The abandoned and decaying bus on the Stampede Trail where McCandless died became a pilgrimage destination for fans. In the 1940s, a road crew had taken the bus to a remote trail in Denali Borough, Alaska, 30 miles (50 km) from the nearest town, according to Denali Borough Mayor Clay Walker. Visitors had to cross the dangerous Teklanika River. In 2010, a Swiss woman drowned.

On June 18, 2020, the bus was removed due to public safety concerns. It was air-lifted by a US Army Chinook helicopter to an undisclosed location pending a decision about its final destination. The bus was later taken to the Museum of The North at the University of Alaska (Fairbanks), so it could be displayed in a permanent exhibit. Pat Druckenmiller, director of museum, told Outside magazine that the bus was a touchstone that "has the power to tell stories about Alaska, about its people, about its culture and natural history, that are all tied to it in many different ways.”

The museum used a $500,000 federal grant and $40,000 in other donations to restore the bus, but the opening of exhibit was delayed because officials said more money was needed. They said in November 2025 that they needed $375,000 to complete the exhibit.

== See also ==
- The Call of the Wild, a 2007 documentary about McCandless made by Ron Lamothe
- Grizzly Man, a 2005 documentary about bear enthusiast Timothy Treadwell, who was killed and eaten by a grizzly while interacting with bears in the Alaskan wilderness
- Survival film, about the film genre, with a list of related films
- Vagabond, a 1985 French film made by Agnès Varda that deals with a similar theme
- Nomadland
