= Brina Kessel =

American ornithologist

- Born: November 20, 1925; Ithaca, New York
- Died: March 1, 2016 (aged 90); Fairbanks, Alaska
- Education: Cornell University, University of Wisconsin
- Scientific career
- Fields: ornithology
- Workplaces: University of Alaska Fairbanks
- Thesis: Investigations On the Life History and Management of the European Starling (Sturnus vulgaris vulgaris L.) in North America (1951)
- Doctoral advisor: Arthur Augustus Allen
- Notable students: George Schaller, Tom Cade

Brina Cattell Kessel (November 20, 1925 – March 1, 2016) was an American ornithologist.

== Early life and family ==
Brina Kessel was born November 20, 1925, in Ithaca, New York, to Quinta Cattell and Marcel Hartwig Kessel, one of five children. Both of her parents encouraged her interest in birds and natural history at an early age. She counted among her grandparents James McKeen Cattell, an influential psychologist and academic. She was raised in Storrs, Connecticut, and attended elementary and high school there.

Kessel was graduated from Cornell University in 1947 with a Bachelor of Science degree. She then went to the University of Wisconsin to study with Aldo Leopold. Unfortunately, Leopold died fighting a fire on his property in 1948. She also learned that the university did not accept women into its doctoral program in wildlife management. She received a master's degree from Wisconsin in 1949 and returned to Cornell to resume her studies with Arthur Augustus Allen. Kessel collected some of the first recordings of bird vocalization at Cornell. With her dissertation on the European starling, she received her PhD in 1951.

Brina Kessel married Raymond Roof. Roof was on the faculty of the University of Alaska. At the time of his death, May 9, 1968, he was a design engineer at the university's Geophysical Institute.

== Career ==
Brina Kessel joined the faculty of the University of Alaska Fairbanks (UAF) as an instructor in zoology in the summer of 1951. (At that time, Fairbanks was the only campus for the university.) She advanced quickly to professorship. She served as head of the Department of Biological Sciences from 1957 through 1966 and as dean of the College of Biological Sciences and Renewable Resources from 1961 to 1972. For the University of Alaska Museum, she was curator of terrestrial vertebrates from 1972 to 1990 and curator of ornithology from 1990 until her retirement in 1997.

Brina Kessel conducted research on many aspects of Alaska's bird life over a span of more than 55 years. A particular interest was birds of the taiga and tundra. Her early research in the 1950s explored the lands of Naval Petroleum Reserve Number 4 on Alaska's North Slope; however, in those days the Department of Defense did not permit women to conduct fieldwork on the property. Thus, Tom Cade and George Schaller worked in the field, while Kessel wrote up results as principal investigator. A few years later, Kessel worked in the Brooks Range with Margaret Murie and her husband Olaus Murie. Kessel worked in the field for many years studying the avifauna of the Seward Peninsula.

Kessel's research culminated in publications that include Birds of the Seward Peninsula, Alaska (1989) and Habitat Characteristics of Some Passerine Birds in Western North American Taiga (1998).

Kessel brought her scientific expertise to several projects in the realm of Alaskan economic development. In the early 1980s, she performed fieldwork in the upper valley of the Susitna River in anticipation of a hydroelectric dam project.

From 1959 to 1963, she was the project director for ecological investigations for Project Chariot, a proposal by the Atomic Energy Commission (AEC) to create an artificial harbor by detonating a suite of nuclear devices, the proposal subsequently abandoned. UAF researchers working on the project, among them Leslie Viereck and William O. Pruitt, objected to the way that the university's client, the AEC, had characterized findings in their progress reports; Kessel presented these objections to the university's president, William Ransom Wood in a meeting in October 1960. However, when Viereck, Pruitt, and others presented a "minority report" critical of Project Chariot in an issue of the News Bulletin of the Alaska Conservation Society in March 1961, Kessel considered their report biased and ethically flawed. Pruitt's research contribution to the overall project report, on the ecology of certain terrestrial mammals in the study area, was submitted to Kessel in December 1961. Kessel's edits of Pruitt's draft became a point of contention, and the final report appeared in April 1962 under William Pruitt's name, "as modified by" Brina Kessel. Two months before the final report, Kessel received correspondence from John N. Wolfe of the AEC; he wrote that Pruitt's version of the draft was "not highly satisfactory" and that the AEC's final payment to the university was "contingent upon the receipt of a satisfactory [final] report." The degree to which Wolfe had an influence on the final report is not certain.

== Later life and death ==
Brina Kessel was awarded emeritus status at UAF as dean, professor, and curator of ornithology in 1999. She died on March 1, 2016, in Fairbanks.

== Legacy and recognition ==
Brina Kessel, through her estate, made a large gift to the University of Alaska to fund the Birds of Alaska project and to establish the Kessel Ornithology Endowment Fund.

Brina Kessel was named a fellow of the American Association for the Advancement of Science in 1960. In 1973, she became one of the first women to be named a fellow of the American Ornithologists' Union (AOU); she served the AOU as president from 1992 to 1994. The AOU, now the American Ornithological Society, established the Brina C. Kessel Award to recognize an outstanding recent article published in The Auk: Ornithological Advances. Kessel was elected to fellowship in the Arctic Institute of North America in 1978. From the University of Alaska, she received its President's Distinguished Service Award in 1981.

The Brina Kessel Medal for Excellence in Science is granted annually to an undergraduate student at UAF. Kessel Pond at Creamer's Field Migratory Waterfowl Refuge in Fairbanks was named in her honor.

== Selected publications ==
- Kessel, Brina (October 1957). "A Study of the Breeding Biology of the European Starling (Sturnus vulgaris L.) in North America". The American Midland Naturalist. 58 (2): 257–331. doi:10.2307/2422615. JSTOR 2422615.
- Kessel, Brina; Cade, Tom J. (1958). Birds of the Colville River, Northern Alaska. Biological Papers of the University of Alaska. Vol. 2. University of Alaska.
- Kessel, Brina; Schaller, George B. (1960). Birds of the Upper Sheenjek Valley, Northeastern Alaska. Biological Papers of the University of Alaska. Vol. 4.
- Isleib, M. E. "Pete"; Kessel, Brina (1973). Birds of the North Gulf Coast-Prince William Sound Region, Alaska. Biological Papers of the University of Alaska. Vol. 14.
- Kessel, Brina; Gibson, Daniel A. (1978). Status and Distribution of Alaska Birds. Studies in Avian Biology. Vol. 1. Cooper Ornithological Society.
- Kessel, Brina (April 1989). Birds of the Seward Peninsula, Alaska. Fairbanks, AK: University of Alaska Press. ISBN 9780912006291.
- Kessel, Brina (January 1998). Habitat Characteristics of Some Passerine Birds in Western North American Taiga. Fairbanks, AK: University of Alaska Press. ISBN 9780912006987.

== Bibliography ==
- O'Neill, Dan (1994). The Firecracker Boys: H-bombs, Inupiat Eskimos and the Roots of the Environmental Movement. New York, NY: St. Martin's Press. OCLC 1061783941.
- Winker, Kevin; Kessel, Quentin Cattell; Gibson, Daniel D. (1 October 2016). "Brina Cattell Kessel, 1925–2016". The Auk. 133 (4): 820–821. doi:10.1642/AUK-16-139.1.
