= Minto Flats South Fire =

Wildfire in Alaska

Coordinates: 64.7466°N 149.5047°W

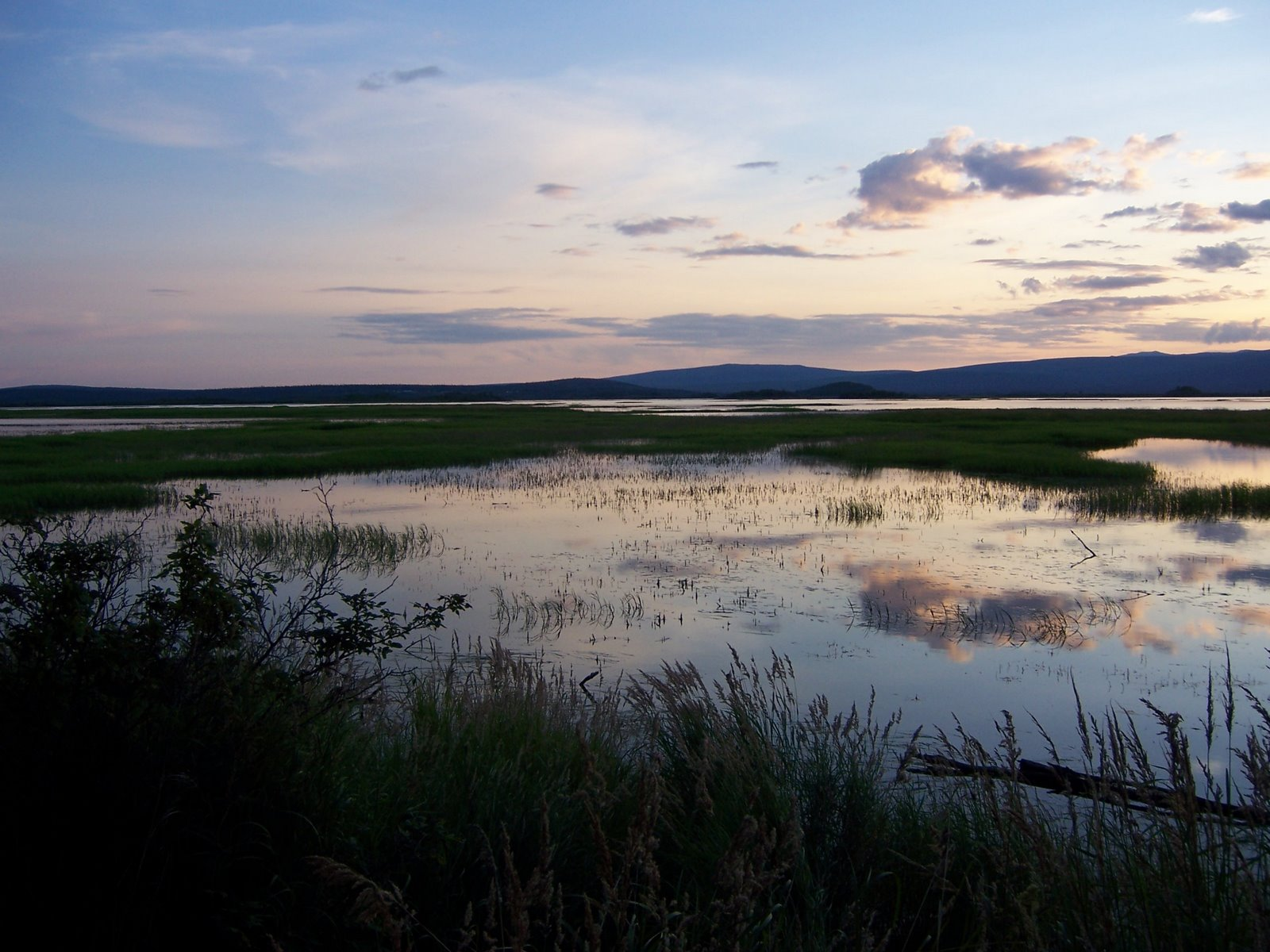
- Image of the Minto Flats
- Date: June 2009 - August 2009
- Location: Near Fairbanks, Alaska

Statistics
- Total area: 517,078 acres (2,092.54 km^{2})

Ignition
- Cause: Lightning

The Minto Flats South Fire was a lightning-caused wildfire in Interior Alaska south of Fairbanks that ignited in late June 2009. It was by far the largest in what was termed the "Railbelt complex" of fires, so named because they were all near the main route of the Alaska Railroad. By July 16 it had burned more than 156,469 acres (63,321 ha). Alaska was experiencing an unusually hot and dry start to the summer season which in turn led to a very active wildfire season. By the time the Minto Flats fire had become the largest fire in Alaska, over seventy other blazes were active throughout the state, stretching resources to their limits. The main body of the fire was deemed too large to actually try to extinguish and firefighting efforts focused from the beginning on protecting lives and property. In mid July it had grown to over 20,000 acres (8,100 ha) and was rapidly expanding along its southern edge; smokejumpers were deployed to protect cabins along the Teklanika River near Nenana. Firefighters cleared away fuels surrounding an oil drilling rig in the area and instructed the drilling crew on the use of firefighting equipment. It burned so aggressively that it advanced against the wind at times. By the end of July over 350 people were involved in the firefighting effort. Continued hot, dry weather helped the fire grow to over 300,000 acres (120,000 ha). The fire was not declared under control until late August. The final acreage of the fire was 517,078.
