= Stretch Screamers =

Electronic toy line

- Type: Stretchy
- Company: Manley Toys Limited
- Country: Hong Kong
- Materials: Rubber, electronics

Stretch Screamers was a series of electronic toys by Manley Toys Limited of Hong Kong.

== Design ==
Stretch Screamers were a line of toy monsters from the early 2000s that could be stretched, causing them to scream. They also featured a "balloon feature" that when squeezed, balls of colored liquid would pop out. Older models featured plastic hands that were prone to popping off of the rubber arms and the balloon effect was filled with an iridescent colored fluid. Newer models had soft rubber hands and gel and floating objects replacing the colored fluid inside the balloon effect. Stretch Screamers had several other toy lines including, Mini Stretch Screamers, Blister Beasts, Splat Bugz, and Stretch Screamers Oozers.

At one point in the early 2000s, the toys were quite popular, so much so that they had their own McDonald's Happy Meal toy line in 2003, but they have since fallen into obscurity and have been discontinued and have been known to fetch high prices online. The toys have since been redesigned and re-released in both 2010 and 2016 in the UK and several other countries.

== Toys ==
Series 1 and 2

- "Mummy" was featured in the first TV ad, and it had an emaciated grey, semi-skeletal face with a red tongue and yellow eyes. It wore an Egyptian style cloth tunic which could be removed from the figure. When the head was squeezed its left eye would bulge out in a ball of bright yellow iridescent liquid. This figure shares a sound chip with the other mummy figures that would appear in the Blister Beast line as well as the 2010 and 2016 UK editions. It also appeared as the sound chip for the mini-dungeons from the mini Stretch Screamers line.
- "Wolfman" featured a wolf-like face with yellow cat-like eyes. It stood bipedal like the rest of the figures. It had yellow skin and a removable red open shirt. Its hard plastic lower half featured torn denim shorts and highly detailed sculpted in fur. The wolfman stretch screamer also featured a unique sound chip which none of the other figures would share. When the head was squeezed the "balloon effect" would protrude from the figures' right cheek.
- "Ghoul" heavily resembled Ghostface from the Scream film series. The figure was covered in black bandages and a removable black cloak. When the head was squeezed a ball of red iridescent liquid would bulge out of the figure's mouth. This figure shares a sound chip with the Gross Gargoyle as well as the other ghoul figures that would appear in the Blister Beast line as well as the 2010 and 2016 UK editions.
- "Frankenstein" was featured in the first TV ad along with the Mummy. The original Frankenstein figure strayed away from the traditional flat-top head Frankenstein design. The figure had long black sculpted in hair, pale green skin, yellow eyes and brown bolts in the temples. It featured a brown vest that tied together from the front. When the head was squeezed its brain would emerge in a pink ball of iridescent fluid. Its sound chip was the most reused. It is shared by Scary Cyclops, Rage and Lava from the Blister Beast line as well as the 2010 and 2016 UK editions.
- "Scary Cyclops" featured a Ray Harryhausen-esque design with singular eye, light blue skin, gold teeth and earring. It also had a slouched stature to emphasize its balloon effect. It had a removable brown shirt that tied together. The figure along with the rest of the characters in series 2 featured detailed squishy hands as opposed to series 1's hard plastic hands. The cyclops had brown shackles around its wrists and barefoot detailed hard plastic feet. It also featured a bellybutton which was unique to the figure. When the body was squeezed a ball of green gel would bulge out from the figures' left shoulder. It also contained a small rubber man's head that was featured on the box art as well. It shared a sound chip with the Frankenstein figure as well as the other ones featured under Frankensteins' description.
- Gross Gargoyle resembled less of a stone Gargoyle and more of a jaundiced skinned Demon or Goblin. It stood crouched with a hunched back to emphasize its balloon feature. Its face had a large nose and ears, a singular white horn jutting from its head, a wide-open mouth filled with sharp bright yellow teeth. Its eyes had yellow whites and red irises. It wore tattered red shorts and a removable dark green cloak that when removed reveals the figures' scoliosis inflicted spine. Its arms were particularly long and its wrists wore silver shackles with remnants of chains still attached. It is similar in gait to the Scary Cyclops except the hands only have four fingers on each hand instead of five. When the body was squeezed a yellow mass filled with gel and rubber bones would emerge from the figures' back hump. It shares a sound chip with the Ghoul.
- Angry Alien was a truly unique design. It was an alien with a light blue head with green compound eyes. It did not have a removable costume as its body was a purple and yellow space suit complete with hard plastic helmet over the head which would contain the balloon effect. The space suit had oxygen tanks on the back of the figure and tubes that would lead up to the helmet. It had squishy grey tri-fingered hands and hard almost claw-like bisected feet. The figure also had a detachable ray gun that would attach to a hole on its right thigh. When the body was squeezed it would cause the aliens' red brain to bulge up against the helmet. It had a unique sound chip that sounded shrill and other worldly that would not be shared by any of the other figures.
- Creepy Creature was an aquatic fish-like monster baring some resemblance to the Gill-man. Like the Angry Alien, the figure did not have any removable clothing as its skin was green and scaly, complete with fins, webbed hands, bright green eyes, very large gills and an open mouth filled with several rows of short white teeth. When the body was squeezed, the balloon effect would emerge from the figure's chest in the form of a green mass with rubber organs. It had a unique sound chip that sounded of gurgling and belching. The McDonald's happy meal toy line also had creature figure that was very similar in design.
- "Blister Beast" were a line of the Stretch Screamers series that featured four new characters that each had multiple balloon effects, two of which had larger heads where the balloon effects would come out while the other two had smaller heads and larger bodies to accommodate the balloon effects.
- Mummy
- Ghoul
- Rage
- Lava

Oozers

- Drooler
- Gunk
- Slobber
- Sludge

Splat Bugz

- Fright Termite
- Gross Roach
- Splat Ant
- Squishy Scorpion
- Splatter Fly
- Mushy Dragonfly
- Mighty Mantis
- Tarantula

Mini Stretch Screamers were a line of hard plastic Stretch Screamers figures that were held together by elastic cords. When different parts of the characters were pulled "gross surprises" would be revealed. They were not electronic however, as some models included a dungeon or alien lab that had a button that when pressed would play limited sound clips from the "Mummy" character. These figures were highly detailed with spattered paint jobs and unique sculpts.

- Krackus was an aquatic fish like monster baring no resemblance to the Creepy Creature. It had a bright green chest and abdomen while the head, arms, and legs were a dark, almost black green. Its hands and feet were webbed and had yellow eyes and two small insect like fangs. The figures' head, arms. and back were covered in fins as well. When the head was pulled, it would reveal Krackus' bug like eyes and when his secondary head was pulled, it would reveal a chasm of sharp teeth leading down his throat. Pulling on the torso reveals some greenish rib bones.
- N-Fested resembles a stone gargoyle. On the box he appears to be a soft pink color but in actuality it is grey and resembles stone. It stands in similar fashion to Gross Gargoyle. Its face is similar to that of a Bulldog, with two fangs pointed upward. The character also features a cybernetic arm. It has a tribal style belt with an orange fur loincloth. The characters' arms and head are able to be pulled along with a back piece that when pulled or moved aside reveals many small versions of the creature living inside of it.
- Xross-Check (pronounced "Cross Check") is a presumably deceased hockey player wearing a mask similar to that of Jason Voorhees from Friday the 13th franchise. This character has grey skin, parted orange hair, and the arms and stomach are wrapped in grip tape. Pulling on the head reveals his skull and pulling the torso reveals his organs.
- Uga-Bug is a bipedal roach monster.
- The 1-ton Twins
- Skull Alien

"McDonald's Stretch Screamers"

- Mummy
- Cyborg
- Robot
- Scientist
- Skeleton
- Creature
- Ogre (recalled)
- Ghost (recalled)

2010 release

- Ghoul
- Mummy
- Frankenstein
- Dracula
- 2016 release
- Ghoul
- Mummy
- Frankenstein
