= Chris McCandless =

American hiker and explorer (1968–1992)

- McCandless next to the Fairbanks City Transit System Bus 142 on the Stampede Trail, found as an undeveloped photographic film in his camera after his death
- Born: Christopher Johnson McCandless; February 12, 1968; El Segundo, California, U.S.
- Died: August 1992 (aged 24); Stampede Trail, Alaska, U.S.
- Cause of death: Starvation
- Body discovered: September 6, 1992
- Other name: Alexander Supertramp
- Education: Emory University (BA)
- Parents: Walt McCandless (father); Billie McCandless (mother)

Christopher Johnson McCandless (/məˈkændlɪs/; February 12, 1968 – August 1992), also known by his pseudonym "Alexander Supertramp", was an American adventurer who pursued a nomadic lifestyle after college.

After graduating from Emory University in Georgia in 1990, McCandless traveled across North America and eventually hitchhiked to Alaska in April 1992. There, he entered the Alaskan bush with minimal supplies, hoping to live simply off the land. On the eastern bank of the Sushana River, McCandless found an abandoned bus, Fairbanks Bus 142, which he used as a makeshift shelter until his death. In September, his body, weighing only 67 pounds (30 kg), was found inside the bus by a hunter. McCandless's cause of death was officially ruled to be starvation, although the exact circumstances relating to his death remain the subject of some debate.

In the January 1993 Outside magazine, Jon Krakauer wrote an article about McCandless. Inspired by the details of McCandless's story, Krakauer published the biography Into the Wild, which was then adapted into a 2007 film directed by Sean Penn, with Emile Hirsch portraying McCandless. On September 29 of that same year, McCandless became the subject of Ron Lamothe's documentary The Call of the Wild.

== Early life ==
Christopher Johnson McCandless was born in El Segundo, California. He was the elder child of Wilhelmina Marie "Billie" McCandless (née Johnson) and Walter "Walt" McCandless, and had a younger sister named Carine, born in July 1971. McCandless also had six half-siblings from Walt's first marriage, who lived with their mother in California and later in Denver, Colorado. In 1976, the family relocated to Annandale, Virginia, where McCandless's father was hired as an antenna specialist for the National Aeronautics and Space Administration (NASA). McCandless's mother worked as a secretary for Hughes Aircraft. The couple established a consulting business out of their home, specializing in Walt's area of expertise.

Carine McCandless alleged in her memoir The Wild Truth that her parents inflicted verbal and physical abuse upon each other and their children, often fueled by her father's alcoholism. She cited their abusive childhood, as well as his reading of Jack London's The Call of the Wild, as the motivating factors in her brother's desire to "disappear" into the wilderness. In a statement released to the media shortly before the memoir was released, Walt and Billie McCandless denied their daughter's accusations, stating that her book is "fictionalized writing [that] has absolutely nothing to do with our beloved son, Chris, his journey or his character. This whole unfortunate event in Chris's life 22 years ago is about Chris and his dreams."

In 1986, McCandless graduated from W.T. Woodson High School in Fairfax, Virginia. He excelled academically, although a number of teachers and fellow students observed that he "marched to the beat of a different drummer." McCandless also served as captain of the cross-country team, where he would urge teammates to treat running as a spiritual exercise in which they were "running against the forces of darkness ... all the evil in the world, all the hatred."

In the summer of 1986, McCandless travelled to Southern California and reconnected with relatives and friends. While he was there, McCandless learned that his father had lived for a time in a bigamous union with his mother who was his second wife; he had also fathered a child with his first wife after the birth of Chris and his sister by his second wife.

McCandless graduated from Emory University in May 1990 with a bachelor's degree in the double majors of history and anthropology. McCandless was an academic high achiever. After graduating, he donated his college savings of over $24,000 (approximately $59,000 in 2025) to Oxfam and adopted a vagabond lifestyle, working when necessary as a restaurant food preparer and farm-hand. An avid outdoorsman, McCandless completed several lengthy wilderness hiking trips and paddled a canoe down a portion of the Colorado River before hitchhiking to Alaska in April 1992.

== Personal life ==
McCandless had a particular interest in classic literature. According to Krakauer, some of his favorite writers were Jack London, Mark Twain, Leo Tolstoy, and H. G. Wells. He was also heavily influenced by 19th-century American writer and naturalist Henry David Thoreau, and was engrossed by his essay On the Duty of Civil Disobedience. McCandless highlighted a section on chastity in Thoreau's Walden, which has raised questions regarding his sexuality. There is no indication of McCandless having any romantic partners throughout his life, and he is believed to have remained celibate. While staying in Niland Slabs, a 17-year-old girl made advances, but McCandless rejected them.

== Travels ==
McCandless left Virginia in the summer of 1990, driving a Datsun west in an apparent cross-country trip to California. His car was in poor condition and suffered numerous breakdowns as he made his way out of the eastern United States. He also carried no car insurance on the vehicle and was driving with expired license plates. By the end of the summer, McCandless had reached the Lake Mead National Recreation Area, where a flash flood disabled his car. Fearful of fines or possibly even arrest due to lack of a valid license, registration, and insurance, McCandless removed the car's license plates, took what he could carry, and kept moving on foot. His car was later found, repaired, and put into service as an undercover vehicle for the local police department.

Traveling northwest, McCandless then hitchhiked into the Sierra Nevada mountains, where he broke into a closed cabin to steal food, supplies, and money. Throughout the winter of 1990 and in 1991, McCandless appears to have lived in hermit camps with other vagrants in the Sierra Nevada region. He was suspected of burglarizing other cabins when food and money ran low, but only one case was ever positively confirmed by authorities after his death.

=== Mexico and arrest ===
In early 1991, McCandless left the Sierra Nevada and hitchhiked in a circular course south through California, into Arizona, and then north to South Dakota. Completely out of cash with no means to support himself, he obtained a job as a grain elevator operator in Carthage, South Dakota. He worked at this job for the remainder of 1991, until one day suddenly quitting and leaving his supervisor a postcard, which read:

Tramping is too easy with all this money. My days were more exciting when I was penniless and had to forage around for my next meal ... I've decided that I'm going to live this life for some time to come.

McCandless then headed west and used money from his job to buy a kayak and kayaking gear as well as a handgun. He then navigated the Colorado River, without a permit, and was occasionally pursued by wildlife and park rangers who had heard of his exploits from other river travelers, several of whom had been concerned that McCandless had been seen white water rafting in dangerous areas of the river with no safety equipment. In all, sightings of McCandless were reported at Lake Havasu, Bill Williams River, the Colorado River Reservoir, Cibola National Wildlife Refuge, Imperial National Wildlife Refuge, and Yuma Proving Ground. The authorities attempted, but never succeeded, in locating McCandless, who was wanted due to his lack of proper river training as well as kayaking on the river without a valid boating license.

McCandless eventually followed the Colorado River all the way to Mexico, where he crossed the international border through a spillway at the Morelos Dam. After encountering waterfalls, through which he could no longer navigate in a canoe, McCandless abandoned his river journey and spent a few days alone at the village of El Golfo de Santa Clara, in the state of Sonora. Finding Mexico intimidating, with no way to support himself, he attempted to re-enter the U.S. and was arrested for carrying a firearm at a border checkpoint. McCandless was briefly held in custody but released without charges after his gun was confiscated. Following this experience in Mexico, McCandless began hitchhiking north, eventually winding up back in South Dakota.

=== Alaska ===
In April 1992, McCandless hitchhiked from South Dakota to Fairbanks, Alaska. After his death, witnesses stated they had seen McCandless in Alaska first at Dot Lake, with several other sightings in Fairbanks. McCandless was stated to be traveling with a "big backpack" and would give a false name if asked his identity. He was described as very suspicious of people around him, unkempt, and smelling due to lack of hygiene. One witness described McCandless as "generally strange, weird, with a weird energy". McCandless was then last seen alive at the head of the Stampede Trail on April 28 by a local electrician named Jim Gallien. Gallien, who had given McCandless a ride from Fairbanks to the start of the rugged track just outside the small town of Healy, later said he had been seriously concerned about the safety of McCandless (who introduced himself as "Alex") after noticing his light pack, minimal equipment, meager rations, and obvious lack of experience. Gallien said he had deep doubts about "Alex's" ability to survive the harsh and unforgiving Alaskan bush.

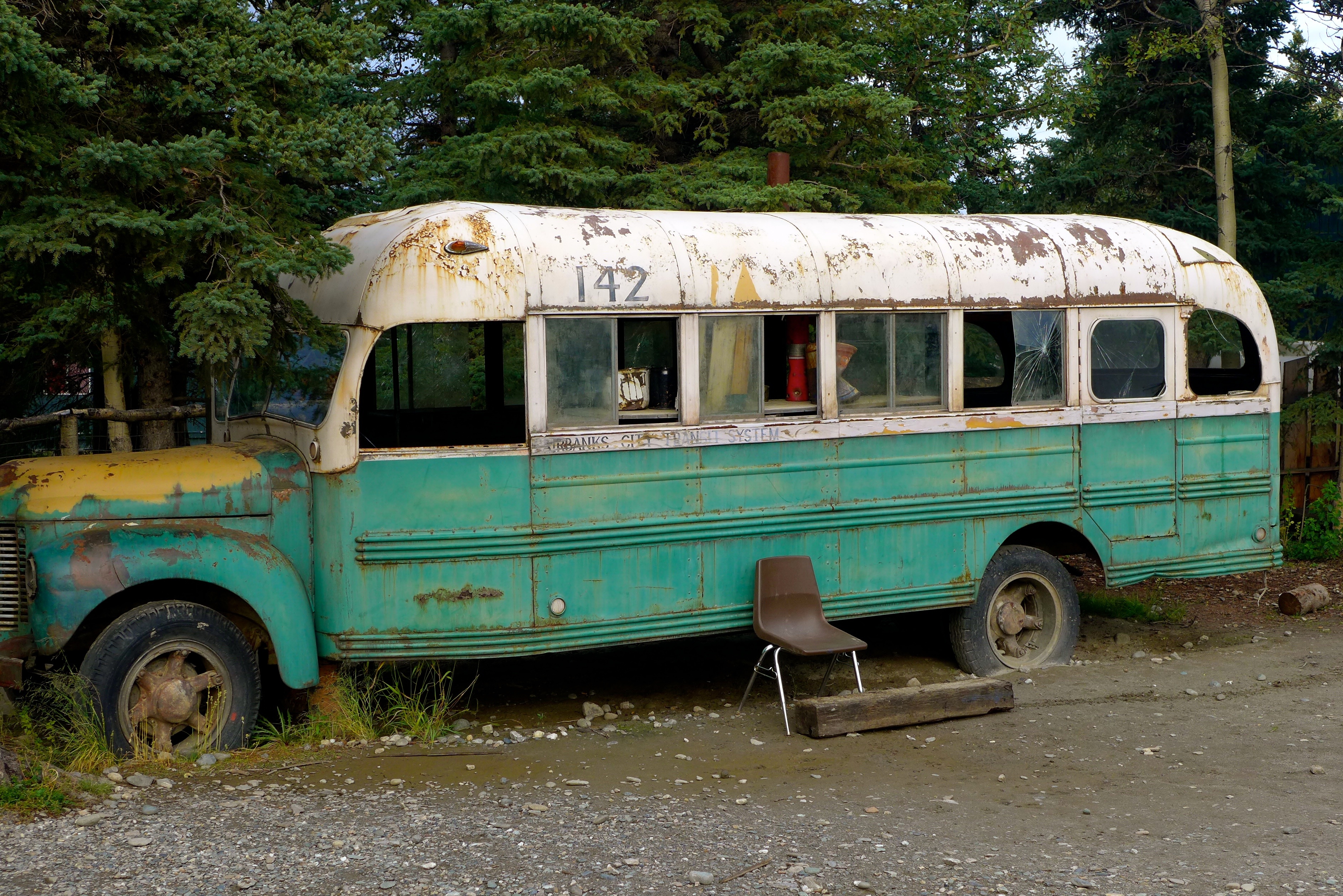
A replica of Bus 142, used in the film Into the Wild

Gallien tried repeatedly to persuade McCandless to delay the trip, at one point offering to detour to Anchorage and buy him suitable equipment and supplies. However, McCandless ignored Gallien's persistent warnings and refused his offers of assistance (though he did accept a pair of Xtratufs, two sandwiches, and a packet of corn chips from Gallien). Gallien dropped McCandless off, believing he would head back towards the highway within a few days as hunger set in.

Locations
1 The bus location when McCandless lived there.

After hiking along the snow-covered Stampede Trail, McCandless came upon an abandoned bus (about 28 miles (45 km) west of Healy at 63°52′5.96″N 149°46′8.39″W) alongside an overgrown section of the trail near Denali National Park. McCandless, according to Krakauer, attempted to continue "heading west until [he] hit the Bering Sea." However, he was deterred by the thick Alaskan bush and returned to the bus, where he set up camp and lived off the land. He had 4.5 kilograms (9.9 lb) of rice; a Remington Nylon 66 semi-automatic rifle with 400 rounds of .22LR hollowpoint ammunition; a number of books, including one on local plant life; some personal effects and a few items of camping equipment. Self-portrait photographs and journal entries indicate he foraged for edible plants and hunted game including porcupines, squirrels, and birds such as ptarmigans and Canada geese. On June 9, 1992, McCandless illegally stalked and shot a moose. However, the meat spoiled within days after he failed in his efforts to preserve it. McCandless would experience profound regret as a result of this experience, expressing in a journal entry "I now wish I had never shot the moose. One of the greatest tragedies of my life."

It had been speculated that McCandless was responsible for vandalizing several cabins in the area that were stocked with food, survival equipment, and emergency supplies; however, he was not considered a viable suspect by the National Park Service.

== Death ==
McCandless's final written journal entry, noted as "Day 107", simply read, "BEAUTIFUL BLUE BERRIES." Days 108 through 112 contained no words and were marked only with slashes, and on Day 113, there was no entry. The exact date and time of his death are unknown. Near the time of his death, McCandless took a picture of himself waving while holding a written note, which read:

I HAVE HAD A HAPPY LIFE AND THANK THE LORD. GOODBYE AND MAY GOD BLESS ALL!

On September 6, 1992, hunters discovered McCandless's remains in the bus. State troopers later confirmed that it was McCandless and transported the body to Anchorage.

=== Theories of starvation ===
In his book Into the Wild (1996), Jon Krakauer proposes two factors that may have contributed to McCandless's death.

==== Protein poisoning ====
Krakauer wrote McCandless could have died of "rabbit starvation", officially known as protein poisoning, from over-relying on lean meat for nutrition.

==== Swainsonine in Hedysarum alpinum seeds ====
Krakauer speculated that McCandless might have been poisoned by a toxic alkaloid called swainsonine, after eating sweet-vetch seeds (Hedysarum alpinum or Hedysarum mackenzii) containing the toxin, or possibly by a mold that can grow on them, when he put them into a plastic bag. Swainsonine inhibits the metabolism of glycoproteins, which leads to starvation despite ample food consumption.

In an article in the September 2007 issue of Men's Journal, correspondent Matthew Power states that extensive laboratory testing showed there were no toxins or alkaloids present in the sweet-vetch seeds McCandless had been eating. Thomas Clausen, then-head of the chemistry and biochemistry department at University of Alaska Fairbanks, said, "I tore that plant apart. There were no toxins. No alkaloids. I'd eat it myself." Further, there are no accounts in modern medical literature of a person being poisoned by this species of plant. Power argued that McCandless "couldn't catch enough food to survive, and simply starved to death".

==== Lathyrism due to ODAP in Hedysarum alpinum seeds ====
In 2013, a new hypothesis was proposed. Ronald Hamilton, a retired bookbinder at the Indiana University of Pennsylvania, suggested a link between the symptoms described by McCandless and the poisoning of Jewish prisoners in the concentration camp at Vapniarca. He put forward the proposal that McCandless starved to death because he was suffering from paralysis in his legs induced by lathyrism, which prevented him from gathering food or hiking. Lathyrism may be caused by oxalyldiaminopropionic acid (ODAP) poisoning from seeds of Hedysarum alpinum.

The ODAP, a toxic amino acid, had not been detected by Clausen's previous studies of the seeds because he had suspected and tested for a toxic alkaloid, rather than an amino acid, as no scientist had previously suspected that Hedysarum alpinum seeds contained this toxin. The protein would be relatively harmless to someone who was well-nourished, with access to a normal diet, but would be toxic to someone who was malnourished, physically stressed, and on an irregular and insufficient diet, as McCandless was.

In September 2013, Krakauer published an article in The New Yorker following up on Hamilton's claims. A sample of fresh Hedysarum alpinum seeds was sent to a laboratory for HPLC analysis. Results showed that the seeds contained 0.394% beta-ODAP by weight, a concentration well within the levels known to cause lathyrism in humans, although the interpretation of the results has been disputed by other chemists. The article notes that while occasional ingestion of foodstuffs containing ODAP is not hazardous for healthy individuals eating a balanced diet, "individuals suffering from malnutrition, stress, and acute hunger are especially sensitive to ODAP, and are thus highly susceptible to the incapacitating effects of lathyrism after ingesting the neurotoxin".

==== L-canavanine in Hedysarum alpinum seeds ====
In March 2015, Krakauer co-authored a study of the Hedysarum alpinum seeds McCandless ate. Instead of ODAP, the report found relatively high levels of L-canavanine (an antimetabolite toxic to mammals) in the H. alpinum seeds and concluded "it is highly likely that the consumption of H. alpinum seeds contributed to the death of Chris McCandless."

== Legacy ==
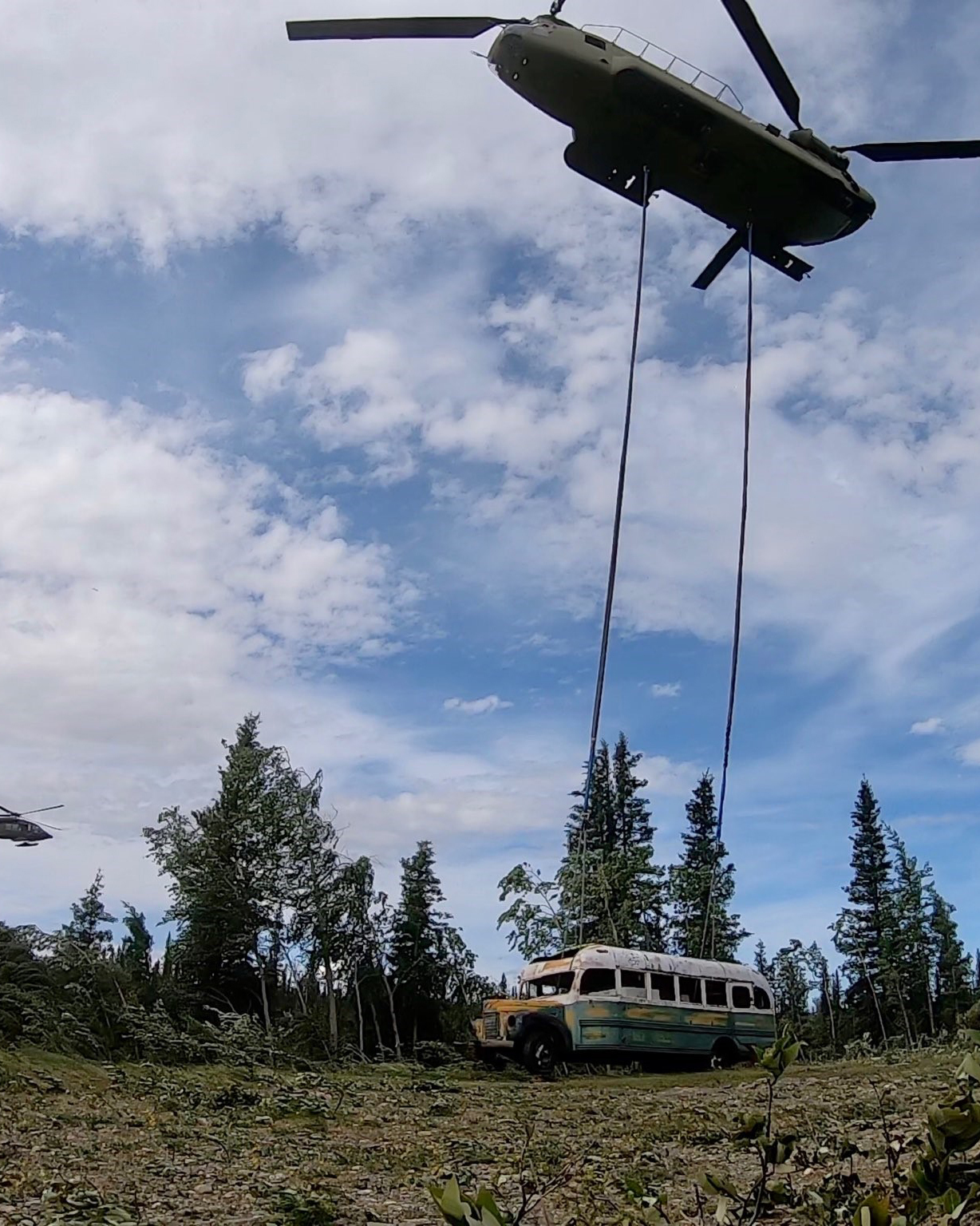
Alaska Army National Guard airlifting the bus via a Boeing CH-47 Chinook on June 18, 2020

The converted green and white bus where McCandless lived and died became a well-known destination for hikers. Known as "The Magic Bus", the 1946 International Harvester was abandoned by road workers in 1961 on the Stampede Trail. A plaque in McCandless's memory was affixed to the interior by his father, Walt McCandless. McCandless's life became the subject of numerous articles, books, films, and documentaries, which helped elevate his life to the status of modern myth. He became a romantic figure to some, inspired by what they see as his free-spirited transcendentalism, but to others, he is a controversial, misguided person.

"The Magic Bus" became a pilgrimage destination for trekkers who would camp at the vehicle. Some of these experienced their own difficulties, or even died attempting to cross the Teklanika River. According to one historian, the bus had become "a latter-day lieu de mémoire" – a "site of memory" that both "stored and secreted communal remembrance".

On June 18, 2020, various government agencies coordinated with an Alaska Army National Guard training mission to remove the bus, deemed a public safety issue after at least 15 people had to be rescued and at least two people died while attempting to cross the Teklanika River to reach the bus. It was flown via a CH-47 Chinook helicopter to Healy, then driven via flatbed truck to an undisclosed location. On September 24, 2020, the Museum of the North at the University of Alaska Fairbanks announced it was the permanent home of McCandless's "Magic Bus 142", which will be restored and exhibited outdoors. It was exhibited indoors for two years, until October 2023, but is still being kept in storage until sufficient funds for conservation are raised.

As of 2025, the bus has had its wheels replaced and The University of Alaska Museum of the North is working to raise the remaining funds needed to construct a dedicated outdoor pavilion. Once completed, the pavilion will sit in a wooded area 150 feet north of the museum parking lot, offering year-round access to the bus in a covered area.

== Assessments ==
McCandless has been a polarizing figure since his story came to widespread public attention with the publication of Krakauer's January 1993 Outside article. While the author and many others have a sympathetic view of the young traveler, others, particularly Alaskans, have expressed negative views about McCandless and those who romanticize his fate.

Sherry Simpson, writing in the Anchorage Press, described her trip to the bus with a friend, and their reaction upon reading the comments that tourists had left lauding McCandless as an insightful, Thoreau-like figure:

Among my friends and acquaintances, the story of Christopher McCandless makes great after-dinner conversation. Much of the time I agree with the "he had a death wish" camp because I don't know how else to reconcile what we know of his ordeal. Now and then I venture into the "what a dumbshit" territory, tempered by brief alliances with the "he was just another romantic boy on an all-American quest" partisans. Mostly I'm puzzled by the way he's emerged as a hero.

Krakauer defends McCandless, claiming that what critics point to as arrogance was merely McCandless's desire for "being the first to explore a blank spot on the map". He continues: "In 1992, however, there were no more blank spots on the map—not in Alaska, not anywhere. But Chris, with his idiosyncratic logic, came up with an elegant solution to this dilemma: He simply got rid of the map. In his own mind, if nowhere else, the terra would thereby remain incognita."

== In popular culture ==
Krakauer's approximately 9,000-word article "Death of an Innocent" (January 1993) was published in Outside. Chip Brown's full-length article on McCandless, "I Now Walk Into the Wild" (February 8, 1993), was published in The New Yorker. Jon Krakauer's non-fiction book Into the Wild (1996) expands upon his 1993 Outside article and retraces McCandless's travels leading up to the hiker's eventual death.

McCandless's story was adapted by screenwriter Chip Johannessen into a 1998 episode of Chris Carter's television series Millennium, titled "Luminary".

An eponymous 2007 film adaptation of Into the Wild, directed by Sean Penn with Emile Hirsch portraying McCandless, received a number of awards, including Best Picture from the American Film Institute. Ron Lamothe's documentary The Call of the Wild (2007) also covers McCandless's life story.

The book Back to the Wild (2011) compiles photographs, postcards and journal entries by McCandless. A PBS documentary uncovering some additional information, with interviews, titled Return to the Wild: The Chris McCandless Story, first aired on the PBS network in November 2014.

In 2014, Carine McCandless, Chris' sister, published The Wild Truth, a memoir of her life. It detailed their abusive home life, providing further context to Chris' actions.

The 1993 album Actually Not, by Virginia-based folk group Eddie From Ohio, features the song "Sahara," written by Robbie Schaefer, about McCandless's wandering and death.

== See also ==
- Carl McCunn, a wildlife photographer who became stranded in the Alaskan wilderness, and eventually committed suicide when he ran out of supplies
- Everett Ruess, who disappeared in the Utah wilderness in 1934
- Timothy Treadwell, who along with his girlfriend was eaten by a grizzly bear in the Alaska wilderness in 2003.
- Ed Wardle, who documented his solo wilderness adventure in the 2009 television series Alone in the Wild
