= Drivel =

Drivel may refer to:

- Drivel, nonsense speech
- Drivel, an American term for saliva
- Driveling, the act of drooling
