= Kikituk =

Creature in Inuit mythology

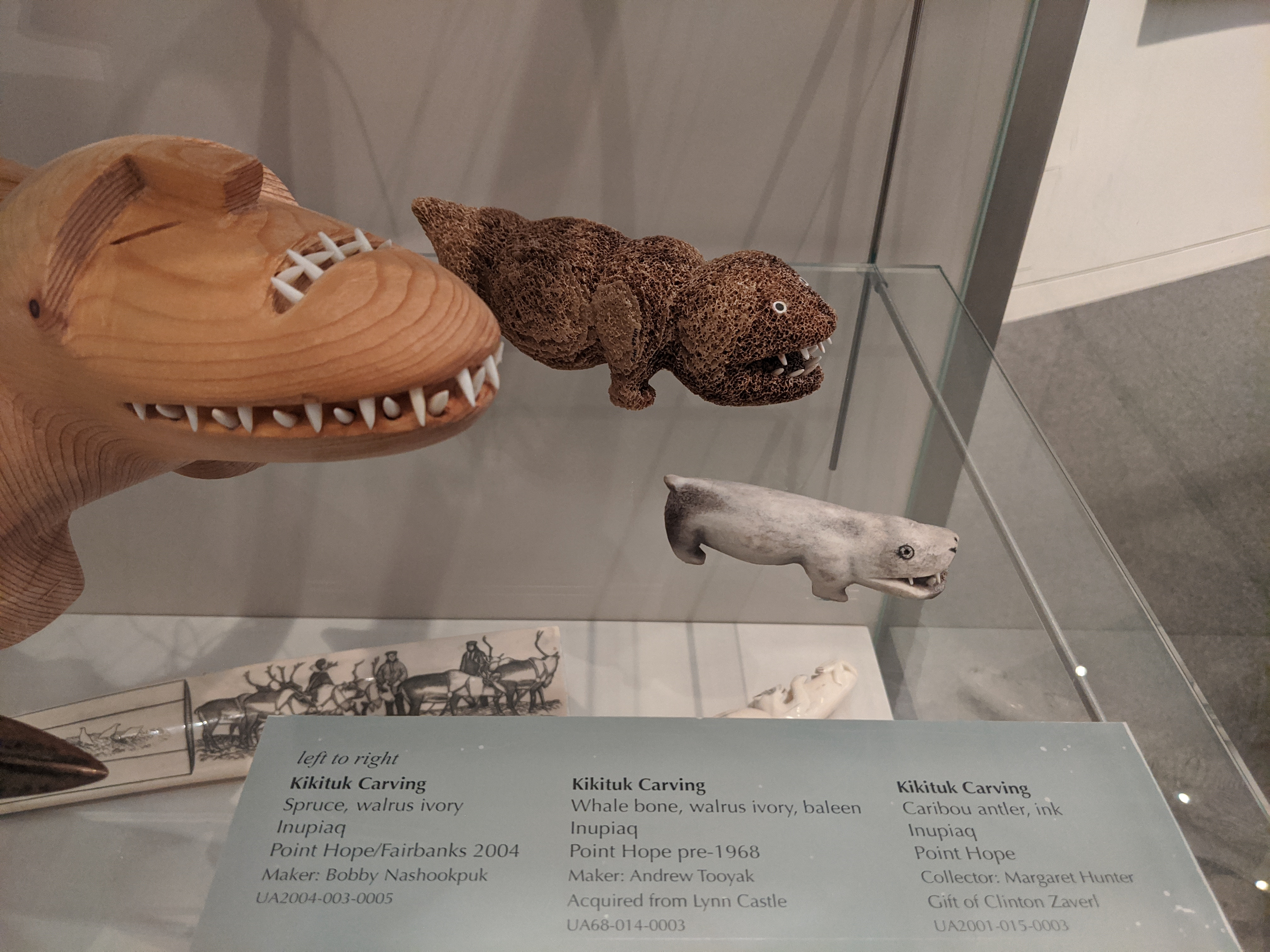
Three kikituk carvings at the University of Alaska Museum of the North

A kikituk is an animal carving or effigy that serves as an object of power and symbolizes a shaman's animalistic spirit in the Inuit religion. The kikituk is used as a spiritual weapon, whereby a shaman brings the effigy to life and casts it towards their target. The kikituk is said to then destroy the opponent's heart and wait to be retrieved.

The animals represented by the kikituk are often meant to be weasel-like. Sometimes the kikituk is referred to as a specific type of sea-faring reptile that hunts humans.

== In popular culture ==
In the Pathfinder Roleplaying Game, the kikituk is a kind of golem made from an intact whale skeleton.
