= Slaframine =

Names
- Preferred IUPAC name (1S,6S,8aS)-6-Aminooctahydroindolizin-1-yl acetate

Identifiers
| CAS Number | 20084-93-9 |
| 3D model (JSmol) | Interactive image |
| ChEBI | CHEBI:9173 |
| ChemSpider | 7969969 |
| KEGG | C06185 |
| PubChem CID | 49787007 |
| UNII | 51H2386GWI |
| CompTox Dashboard (EPA) | DTXSID50942108 |
- InChI: InChI=1/C10H18N2O2/c1-7(13)14-10-4-5-12-6-8(11)2-3-9(10)12/h8-10H,2-6,11H2,1H3
- SMILES: CC(=O)OC1CCN2C1CCC(C2)N

Properties
| Chemical formula | C_{10}H_{18}N_{2}O_{2} |
| Molar mass | 198.266 g·mol^{−1} |
- Except where otherwise noted, data are given for materials in their standard state (at 25 °C [77 °F], 100 kPa). Infobox references

Slaframine is an bicyclic alkaloid mycotoxin that causes salivation (slobbers) in most animals. It is usually produced by the fungus Rhizoctonia leguminicola which is a common fungal pathogen of red clover (Trifolium pratense) that causes black patch disease in the plant. Slaframine has the molecular formula C_{10}H_{18}N_{2}O_{2}. Wet and humid weather are the favorable environmental condition for the growth of the fungus and production of slaframine. Legume hays contaminated with slaframine cause slobber syndrome and various animals are sensitive to its effects.

== History ==
In the late 1940s and 1950s in Midwestern United States, various agricultural experiment stations revealed the outbreaks of salivation in the cattle. In 1956, the first case of fungal contamination of red clover with Rhizoctonia leguminicola was reported which was mainly associated with a pasture disease called black patch, which derives its name from the appearance of affected areas in the field. Most of these cases were associated with the feeding of second-cutting red clover hay. Another serious outbreak of slobbers occurred in a herd of horses in the fall of 1979 near High Point, North Carolina. This was caused by a shipment of high-quality second-cutting red clover-orchard grass hay from a usual supplier in West Virginia. In 2010, the slaframine toxin, or "slobber toxin" was also observed in Central Kentucky because of the wet spring weather and abundant clover growth.

== Metabolism ==
The liver is the major site of slaframine metabolism. It has been suggested that slaframine is metabolized in the liver by a microsomal flavoprotein oxidase to the active metabolite consisting of a quaternary nitrogen separated from an acetate ester by two carbon atoms.

Activation of slaframine in the liver to the putative, biologically active quaternary ammonium metabolite

The more direct access to hepatic tissues provided by the route of administration, the shorter the time interval to the onset of salivation.

== Toxicity ==
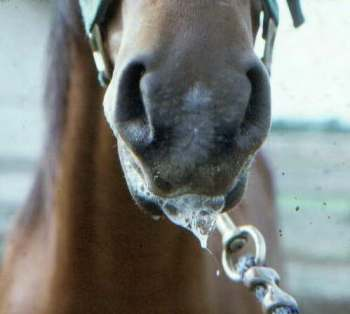
Horse clinically affected with slobbers

In horses, excessive salivation is usually the first sign of slaframine exposure. Signs typically develop within hours of exposure. Slaframine poisoning or slobbers usually occur in a cooler and wetter spring or fall because these seasons are ideal for the growth of the fungus Rhizoctonia leguminicola. The other clinical signs associated with the "slobbers syndrome" include salivation, lacrimation, feed refusal, bloating, stiff joints, diarrhea, and weight loss.

The clinical signs of slaframine toxicity are similar in all species. When animals are fed with slaframine contaminated forage then they salivate profusely. The experiment shows that a single dose of slaframine produces salivation for 6–10 hours. However, clinically affected animals can salivate for several days because they continue to be fed with slaframine contaminated forages. Various other animals like sheep, swine, and guinea pigs were also found to suffer from cyanosis and open-mouth breathing under experimental conditions. Pigs were also observed to vomit, became dyspneic, and collapse with stiffened pelvic limbs.

== Diagnosis and treatment ==
Generally, diagnosis of slaframine toxicity is done by observation of clinical signs (salivation) in animals consuming legume forage, particularly red clover hay. Further tests such as isolating in cultures can be done to identify the fungus Rhizoctonia leguminicola in the hay. Although chemical analysis for slaframine is not usually necessary, chromatographic methods for detecting the toxin in hay, plasma, or milk have been described. The slobber symptoms pass slowly when the contaminated hay is removed, however clinical signs may persist for 1–2 days following removal of the toxic forage. In severe cases, atropine may be of benefit that helps in reversing the parasympathomimetic effects of slaframine, however it is unlikely to completely resolve clinical signs.
