= Indospicine =

Names
- IUPAC name (2S)-2,7-Diamino-7-iminoheptanoic acid

Identifiers
CAS Number	16377-00-7
3D model (JSmol)	Interactive image
ChEBI	CHEBI:6253
ChemSpider	97122
KEGG	C08288
PubChem CID	108010
UNII	X29Q4D9671
CompTox Dashboard (EPA)	DTXSID70167659
- InChI: InChI=1S/C7H15N3O2/c8-5(7(11)12)3-1-2-4-6(9)10/h5H,1-4,8H2,(H3,9,10)(H,11,12)/t5-/m0/s1 Key: SILQDLDAWPQMEL-YFKPBYRVSA-N
- SMILES: C(CCC(=N)N)C[C@@H](C(=O)O)N

Properties
Chemical formula	C_{7}H_{15}N_{3}O_{2}
Molar mass	173.216 g·mol^{−1}
- Except where otherwise noted, data are given for materials in their standard state (at 25 °C [77 °F], 100 kPa). Infobox references

Indospicine is an amino acid not found in proteins, which occurs in Indigofera species. The chemical resembles arginine.

It is toxic to mammals and causes liver damage and abortion. Dogs are particularly sensitive to the toxic effect and can sicken or die after eating a grazing animal that has eaten Indigofera.

== History ==
For years it was known that Indigofera spicata was toxic to cows, rabbits and sheep. Both leaves and seeds are poisonous. Leaves were shown to contain β-nitropropionic acid, which affected chickens, but it was not found in the seeds. M. P. Hegarty, and A. W. Pound performed experiments to isolate the toxin by examining its effect on mouse livers. They used absorption dialysis and paper chromatography to separate chemical components from seeds, focusing on strong bases. Ninhydrin revealed where the different chemicals were on the paper used for chromatography. Bands were cut out of the paper, the substances extracted and then tested on the mice. Only one band was hepatotoxic. The substance was crystallised as a hydrochoride. The hydrochloride melted between 131 and 134°C. (α)^{22}_{D} + 18°. The ratio of elements was established and a rough molecular weight. From the degradation products, the structure was determined.

== Properties ==
Between pH 2 and 10.5 indospicine is an ion with a single positive charge. In stronger alkaline conditions, it decomposes to ammonia and an amide. In strong acid L-α-amino-pimelic acid is formed.

With ninhydrin, indospicine gives a purple colour. With nitroprusside-alkaline ferricyanide reagent a yellow colour is produced, indicating it is not a guanidine derivative.

== See also ==
- Canavanine, another toxic arginine analog
