= Canavanine =

- Chemical structure of L-(+)-(S)-canavanine

Names
- Preferred IUPAC name Canavanine
- Systematic IUPAC name (2S)-2-amino-4-{[(diaminomethylidene)amino]oxy}butanoic acid

Identifiers
CAS Number	543-38-4
3D model (JSmol)	Interactive image
ChEBI	CHEBI:609827
ChemSpider	388342
DrugBank	DB01833
ECHA InfoCard	100.153.281
EC Number	624-714-2
KEGG	C00308
MeSH	Canavanine
PubChem CID	275
UNII	3HZV514J4B
CompTox Dashboard (EPA)	DTXSID5045041
- InChI: InChI=1S/C5H12N4O3/c6-3(4(10)11)1-2-12-9-5(7)8/h3H,1-2,6H2,(H,10,11)(H4,7,8,9)/t3-/m0/s1
- SMILES: N[C@@H](CCON=C(N)N)C(O)=O

Properties
Chemical formula	C_{5}H_{12}N_{4}O_{3}
Molar mass	176.176 g·mol^{−1}
Density	1.61 g·cm^{−3} (predicted)
Melting point	184 °C (363 °F; 457 K)
Boiling point	366 °C (691 °F; 639 K)
Solubility in water	soluble
Solubility	insoluble in alcohol, ether, benzene
log P	−0.91 (predicted)
Vapor pressure	1.61 μPa (predicted)
Acidity (pK_{a})	2.35 (carboxylic acid), 7.01 (oxoguanidinium), 9.22 (ammonium)

Hazards
- GHS labelling
Pictograms	(GHS07: Exclamation mark)
Signal word	Warning
Hazard statements	H302, H312, H332
Flash point	214.6 °C (418.3 °F; 487.8 K) (predicted)
- Except where otherwise noted, data are given for materials in their standard state (at 25 °C [77 °F], 100 kPa). Infobox references

L-(+)-(S)-Canavanine is a non-proteinogenic amino acid found in certain leguminous plants. It is structurally related to the proteinogenic α-amino acid L-arginine, the sole difference being the replacement of a methylene bridge (−CH_{2}− unit) in arginine with an oxa group (i.e., an oxygen atom) in canavanine. Canavanine is accumulated primarily in the seeds of the organisms which produce it, where it serves both as a highly deleterious defensive compound against herbivores (due to cells mistaking it for arginine) and a vital source of nitrogen for the growing embryo. The related L-canaline is similar to ornithine.

== Toxicity ==
The mechanism of canavanine's toxicity is that organisms that consume it typically mistakenly incorporate it into their own proteins in place of L-arginine, thereby producing structurally aberrant proteins that may not function properly. Cleavage by arginase also produces canaline, a potent insecticide.

The toxicity of canavanine may be enhanced under conditions of protein starvation, and canavanine toxicity, resulting from consumption of Hedysarum alpinum seeds with a concentration of 1.2% canavanine weight/weight, has been implicated in the death of a malnourished Christopher McCandless. (McCandless was the subject of Jon Krakauer's book (and subsequent movie) Into the Wild).

Chemical structure of canavanine compared to arginine

=== In mammals ===
NZB/W F1, NZB, and DBA/2 mice fed L-canavanine develop a syndrome similar to systemic lupus erythematosus, while BALB/c mice fed a steady diet of protein containing 1% canavanine showed no change in lifespan.

Alfalfa seeds and sprouts, as well as Jack Bean seeds, contain L-canavanine. The L-canavanine in alfalfa has been linked to lupus-like symptoms in primates, including humans, and other auto-immune diseases. Often stopping consumption reverses the problem.

== Tolerance ==
Some specialized herbivores tolerate L-canavanine either because they metabolize it efficiently (cf. L-canaline) or avoid its incorporation into their own nascent proteins.

=== By metabolic detoxification ===
Herbivores may be able to metabolize canavanine efficiently. The beetle Caryedes brasiliensis is able to break canavanine down to canaline, then further detoxifies canaline by reductive deamination to form homoserine and ammonia. As a result, the beetle not only tolerates the chemical, but uses it as a source of nitrogen to synthesize its other amino acids to allow it to develop.

=== By selectivity ===
An example of this ability can be found in the larvae of the tobacco budworm Heliothis virescens, which can tolerate large (lethal concentration 50 or LC_{50} 300 mM) amounts of dietary canavanine. These larvae fastidiously avoid incorporation of L-canavanine into their nascent proteins due to gastrointestinal expression of canavanine hydrolase, an enzyme that cleaves L-canavanine into L-homoserine and hydroxyguanidine, and L-arginine kinase, which phosphorylates L-canavanine. In contrast, larvae of the tobacco hornworm Manduca sexta can only tolerate tiny amounts (1.0 microgram per kilogram of fresh body weight) of dietary canavanine because their arginine-tRNA ligase has little, if any, discriminatory capacity. No one has examined experimentally the arginine-tRNA synthetase of these organisms. But comparative studies of the incorporation of radiolabeled L-arginine and L-canavanine have shown that in Manduca sexta, the ratio of incorporation is about 3 to 1.

Dioclea megacarpa seeds contain high levels of canavanine. The beetle Caryedes brasiliensis is able to tolerate this however as it has the most highly discriminatory arginine-tRNA ligase known (as of 1982). In this insect, the level of radiolabeled L-canavanine incorporated into newly synthesized proteins is barely measurable. Moreover, this beetle uses canavanine as a nitrogen source (see above).

== See also ==
- Canaline
- Arginine
- Indospicine, another toxic arginine analog

== Bibliography ==
- Rosenthal, Gerald A. (1986). "Biochemical insight into insecticidal properties ofl-Canavanine, a higher plant protective allelochemical". Journal of Chemical Ecology. 12 (5): 1145–56. Bibcode:1986JCEco..12.1145R. doi:10.1007/BF01639001. PMID 24307052. S2CID 37297952.
- Rosenthal, G. A.; Berge, M. A.; Bleiler, J. A.; Rudd, T. P. (1987). "Aberrant, canavanyl protein formation and the ability to tolerate or utilize L-canavanine". Experientia. 43 (5): 558–61. doi:10.1007/BF02143585. PMID 3582574. S2CID 24239284.
- Boyar, A.; Marsh, R. E. (1982). "L-Canavanine, a paradigm for the structures of substituted guanidines". Journal of the American Chemical Society. 104 (7): 1995–1998. Bibcode:1982JAChS.104.1995B. doi:10.1021/ja00371a033.
- Turner BL, Harborne JB (1967). "Distribution of canavanine in the plant kingdom". Phytochemistry. 6 (6): 863–866. Bibcode:1967PChem...6..863T. doi:10.1016/S0031-9422(00)86033-1. and in particularly large amounts in Canavalia gladiata (sword bean).
  - Ekanayake S, Skog K, Asp NG (May 2007). "Canavanine content in sword beans (Canavalia gladiata): analysis and effect of processing". Food and Chemical Toxicology. 45 (5): 797–803. doi:10.1016/j.fct.2006.10.030. PMID 17187914.

.........
