= J. P. Hubrick =

J.P. Hubrick
- Born: John Peter Hubrick; 1858; Danville, New York
- Died: January 22, 1930 (aged 71–72); McCarthy, Alaska
- Spouse(s): Martha(1) and Emma(2)
- Children: 3 daughters

John Peter (J.P.) Hubrick (1858 - January 22, 1930) was an Alaskan adventurer, hunter, newsman and photographer best known for his panoramic photographs of the Wrangell mountain range through the early 1900s. A resident of McCarthy, Alaska, Hubrick started the town's first newspaper, the Copper Bee in February 1916. The paper lasted for only four issues, however, and as such Hubrick's real legacy is derived from his photographic work.

Hubrick is known for his wide panoramas of the Alaskan countryside, some over six feet long. In his panorama "Goat Trail," you can see many goats walking the trail. In the panorama "Taken From Nicolai Hill," you can see the Hubrick party at a photography shoot; two horses, pack animals, and his guide.

It is said that most of Mr. Hubrick's photographs were personally sold in or around McCarthy, Alaska circa 1916–1930. There are also some negatives in existence

. Hubrick copies are sold in Alaska for around $45. In addition to art, panoramas like those of J.P. Hubrick have other uses. They are used today to measure and compare changes in snow pack, providing valuable evidence on issues such as global warming.

Hubrick died of diabetes in 1930. His works are considered very rare. The only known museum to have a collection is the University of Alaska.
