= Canaline =

l-Canaline

Names
- IUPAC name (2S)-2-Amino-4-aminooxy-butanoic acid

Identifiers
CAS Number	496-93-5
3D model (JSmol)	Interactive image
ChEBI	CHEBI:41401
ChEMBL	ChEMBL1231652
ChemSpider	390176
DrugBank	DB02821
KEGG	C08270
PubChem CID	441443
UNII	T7H2XP1ZNS
CompTox Dashboard (EPA)	DTXSID60197925
- InChI: InChI=1/C4H10N2O3/c5-3(4(7)8)1-2-9-6/h3H,1-2,5-6H2,(H,7,8)/t3-/m0/s1 Key: FQPGMQABJNQLLF-VKHMYHEABX
- SMILES: O=C(O)[C@@H](N)CCON

Properties
Chemical formula	C_{4}H_{10}N_{2}O_{3}
Molar mass	134.135 g·mol^{−1}
Density	1.298 g/mL
Melting point	213 °C
Boiling point	378.1 °C (712.6 °F; 651.2 K)
- Except where otherwise noted, data are given for materials in their standard state (at 25 °C [77 °F], 100 kPa). Infobox references

l-Canaline (IUPAC name 2-amino-4-(aminooxy)butyric acid)) is a non-proteinogenic amino acid. The compound is found in legumes that contain canavanine, from which it is produced by the action of arginase. The most common-used source for this amino acid is the jack bean, Canavalia ensiformis.

== Toxicity ==
l-Canaline is the only naturally occurring amino acid known that has an O-alkyl hydroxylamine functionality in the side chain. This amino acid is structurally related to ornithine (it is the 5-oxa derivative) and is a potent insecticide. Tobacco hornworm larvae fed a diet containing 2.5 mM canaline showed massive developmental aberrations, and most larvae so treated died at the pupal stage. It also exhibits potent neurotoxic effects in the moth.

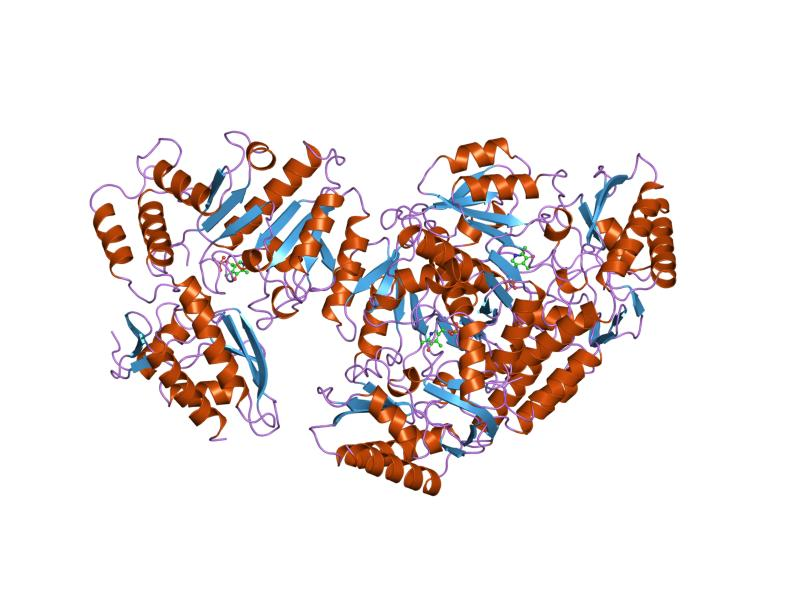
L-Canaline is a substrate for Ornithine aminotransferase

Its toxicity stems primarily from the fact that it readily forms oximes with keto acids and aldehydes, especially the pyridoxal phosphate cofactor of many vitamin B_{6}-dependent enzymes. It inhibits ornithine aminotransferase at concentrations as low as 10 nM.

== Plant nutrition ==
l-Canaline is a substrate for ornithine aminotransferase resulting in the synthesis of l-ureidohomoserine (the corresponding analog of l-citrulline). In turn, the latter forms l-canavaninosuccinic acid in a reaction mediated by argininosuccinic acid synthetase. l-Canavaninosuccinic acid is cleaved to form l-canavanine by argininosuccinic acid synthetase. By these sequential reactions, the canaline-urea cycle (analogous to the ornithine-urea cycle) is formed. Every time a canavanine molecule runs through the canaline-urea cycle, the two terminal nitrogen atoms are released as urea. Urea is an important by-product of this reaction sequence because it makes ammonia (urease-mediated) that is available to support intermediary nitrogen metabolism. l-Canaline can be reductively cleaved to l-homoserine, a non-protein amino acid of great importance in the formation of a host of essential amino acids. In this way, the third nitrogen atom of canavanine enters into the reactions of nitrogen metabolism of the plant. As homoserine, its carbon skeleton also finds an important use.
