= Tom Cade =

American ornithologist (1928–2019)

- Born: January 10, 1928; San Angelo, Texas
- Died: February 6, 2019 (aged 91); Boise, Idaho
- Education: University of Alaska; University of California, Los Angeles
- Spouse: Renetta Mae Bennewater (m. 1952)
- Scientific career
- Fields: Naturalist, ornithologist
- Workplaces: Syracuse University; Cornell University; Boise State University

Thomas Joseph Cade (January 10, 1928 – February 6, 2019) was an American ornithologist most notable for his efforts to conserve the peregrine falcon.

== Early life and education ==
Cade was born on January 10, 1928, in San Angelo, Texas, to parents Ernest and Ethel née Bomar Cade. Ernest was a lawyer, while Ethel was a homemaker. As a child, Cade read a 1937 National Geographic article "Adventures with Birds of Prey", written by Frank and John Craighead, that piqued his interest in falconry.

Cade served in the Army in 1946 and 1947 before attending university. He graduated with a bachelor's degree in biology from the University of Alaska in 1951. He then attended the University of California, Los Angeles, where he graduated with his master's degree in 1955 and his PhD in 1957.

== Career ==
Cade was hired to a faculty position at Syracuse University after he finished his education. There, he experimented with breeding raptors such as the peregrine falcon and American kestrel, convincing the administration to build a breeding facility especially for the falcons. When offered a job at Cornell University, he accepted on the condition that it, too, would build a breeding facility. In 1967 Cade became the director of the Cornell Lab of Ornithology; the "Hawk Barn" was completed in 1970.

The peregrine falcon was severely affected by exposure to DDT, leading to its extirpation from the East Coast of the United States. Cade worked with various stakeholders including universities, falconers, conservationists, and businesses to begin a captive breeding and reintroduction program. The program was relatively novel, as few other falconers had succeeded in breeding the falcons in captivity: Renz Waller twice in the 1940s, Frank Beebe in 1967 (disputed), and Larry Schram in 1968. The difficulty stemmed from the falcon's courtship ritual, which involves an aerial display, usually over 10 mi^{2} (26 km^{2}) of sky. Cade's Hawk Barn was described as a "virtual Peregrine Falcon factory" for its role in captive breeding success.

He also was a founder of The Peregrine Fund, a nonprofit credited as "the world’s most important raptor conservation organization". Efforts of The Peregrine Fund and other conservation groups resulted in more than 6,000 captive-bred falcons released into the wild from 1975 to 1995. The falcons were released into 37 US states and most of the Canadian provinces. To ensure that the captive-born birds were able to adapt to conditions in the wild, they used soft releases: the young falcons would be placed in artificial nests in the wild and fed by humans until they were able to hunt successfully.

In 1980, captive-born birds successfully reproduced in the wild for the first time. The species's North American population steadily increased at 5–10% annually, allowing for population recovery. The peregrine falcon was removed from the US Endangered Species List in August 1999, and Cade was recognized as a "savior" of the species. He later worked at Boise State University, from which he retired in 1993.

== Personal life and death ==
In 1952, Cade married Renetta Mae Bennewaite. Together, they had five children. Cade died on February 6, 2019, at the age of 91 in Boise, Idaho.

== Awards and honors ==
In 1998, Audubon magazine included Cade in their list of 100 "Champions of Conservation". After Cade's death, the Idaho House of Representatives introduced a resolution to honor him, calling him "one of the world's most visionary conservationists and widely respected scientists".

== Selected publications ==
- Cade, Tom (1982). The Falcons of the World. Comstock/Cornell University Press. ISBN 9780801414541.
- Cade, Tom (1988). Peregrine Falcon Populations: Their Management and Recovery. Peregrine Fund. ISBN 9780961983901.
- Cade, Tom; Blount, Clinton (2018). Tom Cade: A Life in Science and Conservation. CreateSpace Independent Publishing Platform. ISBN 9781983848773.
