= Stampede Trail =

Remote trail in Denali Borough, Alaska, US

Path of the Stampede Trail

The Stampede Trail is a road and trail in the Denali Borough in the U.S. state of Alaska near the northern boundary of Denali National Park. Apart from a paved or maintained gravel road for 8 miles (13 km) between Eight Mile Lake and the trail's eastern end, the route consists of a rough trail suitable for hiking or all-terrain vehicles (ATVs) following the path of the original road, which has deteriorated over the years. The route ends at the abandoned Stampede antimony mine (63°44′26.3″N 150°22′45.2″W) on Stampede Creek, near Stampede Airport's grass airstrip.

Historically, access to the east end of the trail was gained from the Alaska Railroad. Today, the primary access to the trail is from the George Parks Highway (Alaska Route 3) which opened in the early 1970s. The Parks Highway intersects the trail at milepost 251.1, two miles north of the center of Healy. Though this intersection marks the present-day eastern terminus of the Stampede Road, Lignite Road continues a few miles east from this intersection to the railroad tracks and the Nenana River.

In 1992, the body of Christopher McCandless was found in an abandoned bus deep inside the wilderness about 28 mi (45 km) down the trail. Writer Jon Krakauer investigated McCandless's travels and journey to the bus in an Outside magazine article published in 1993. He later expanded his article into a book, Into the Wild, published in 1996, which was adapted into a film of the same name in 2007. This made the trail popular among hikers, some unprepared for the rugged conditions, resulting in several rescue operations and some deaths. In 2020, citing safety reasons, the bus was removed and shipped to the University of Alaska Museum of the North.

During the fall, hunting traffic along the trail is heavy as the area is prime habitat for moose. Many hunters use ATVs or Argos to access hunting camps. Moose hunting in this area generally yields high success rates. Winter travel by snowmobile, dog sled, or tracked vehicle, after the boggy tundra, beaver ponds, and rivers freeze, is much easier than summer travel.

== History ==
The Stampede Trail began as the "Lignite to Kantishna" mining trail blazed in 1903 by prospectors drawn to the Kantishna region by the discovery of placer gold. In the 1930s miner Earl Pilgrim used the trail to access his antimony claims on Stampede Creek above the Clearwater Fork of the Toklat River. For many years, the mine was accessed through the use of a winter trail. Antimony ore was shipped east to the railroad through the use of "Cat Trains," sleds loaded with ore and towed by Caterpillar Bulldozers. Fuel and supplies for the mine were backhauled in the same way. The overland cat trains could take three or more days of travel time and February was generally the best month for such winter trail travel.

In 1960, Yutan Construction won a contract from the new state of Alaska to upgrade the trail as part of Alaska's Pioneer Road Program, building a road for trucks to haul ore from the mine year-round for transshipment to the railroad at Lignite (near the present day town of Healy.) Construction was discontinued in 1961 after only 47.5 miles (76.4 km) of road were built. No bridges were constructed over the several rivers it crossed. In 1963 maintenance was halted and the route promptly became impassable for road vehicles by the soft permafrost and seasonal flooding.

The trail has since been used by backcountry travelers on foot, bicycle, dog sleds, snowmobiles and all-terrain vehicles. The trail's main obstacle is crossing the Teklanika River during the summer months when the river swells with snowmelt. Alaska State Troopers have reported several rescues every year at the river crossing. In August 2010, high water resulted in the drowning death of Claire Ackermann, a hiker from Switzerland, and in July 2019 Veranika Nikanava of Belarus was also swept downstream and drowned. Hundreds of hikers attempted to reach Bus 142 every year until its removal in June 2020.

== Bus 142 ==
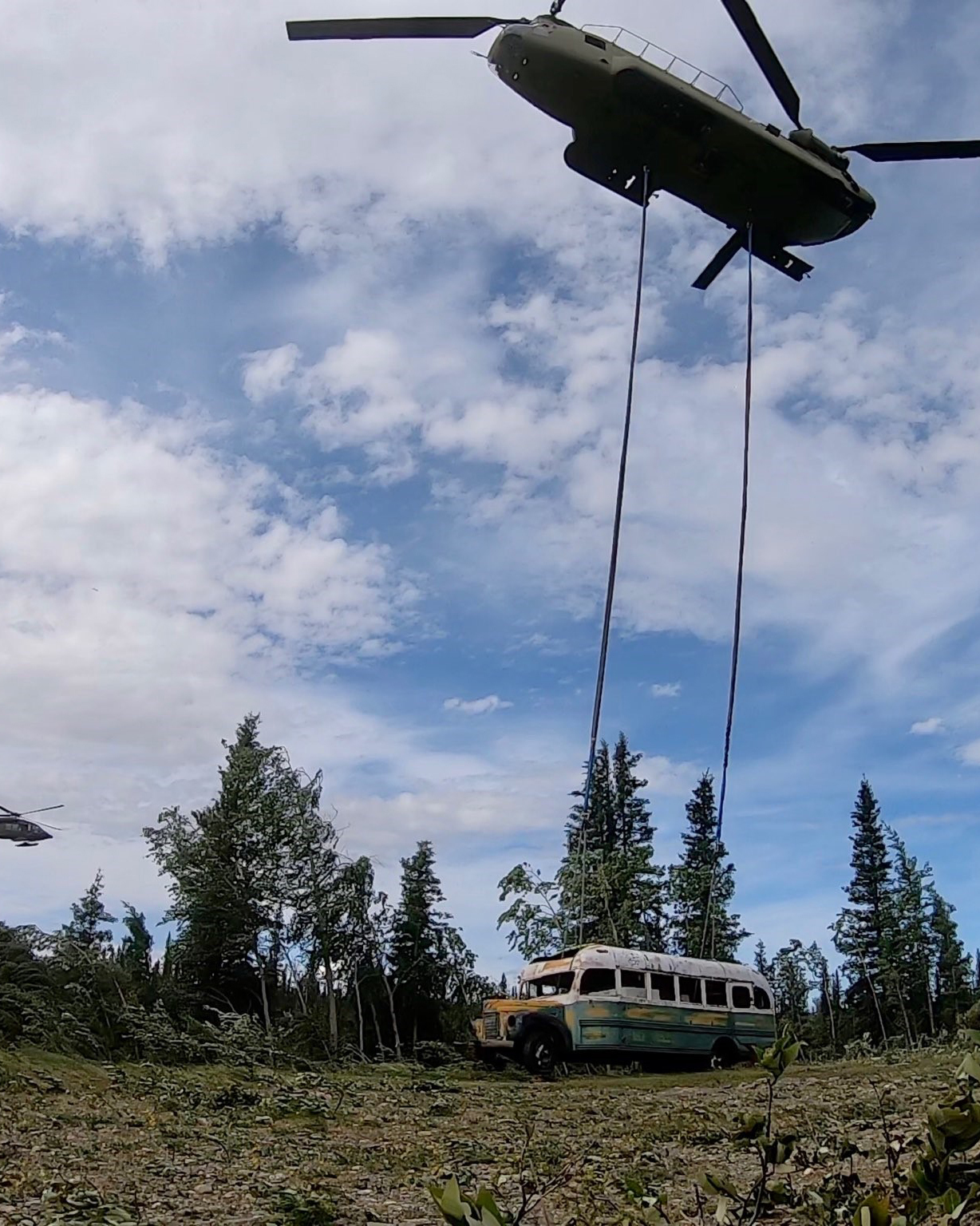
Alaska National Guard helicopter airlifted the bus from Stampede Trail in June 2020

From the 1970s until 2020, an abandoned bus sat in a clearing on the Stampede Trail near Denali National Park, and became a destination for visitors. Fairbanks City Transit System Bus 142 was a 1946 International Harvester K-5 bus which was originally one of three buses used by the Yutan Construction Company to provide site accommodations for the construction crew from Fairbanks that worked on road upgrades in 1960–1961. It was towed to the clearing by a Caterpillar D8 bulldozer, as the engine had been removed. It contained a couple of beds and a wood-burning stove. When the Stampede Mine ceased operations in the 1970s, the other buses were removed, but Bus 142 was left behind due to a broken rear axle, and subsequently served as a shelter for hunters, trappers, and other visitors.

American hitchhiker Christopher McCandless attempted to survive off the Alaskan wilderness during the summer of 1992 and lived in the bus for about three months until he died of starvation. McCandless's story was brought to public attention by a January 1993 article in Outside magazine written by Jon Krakauer titled "Death of an Innocent", which he adapted into a book, Into the Wild, in 1996. The bus – referred to by McCandless in his journal as the "Magic Bus" – became a pilgrimage site for visitors seeking the location where he died. The 2007 film version of Into the Wild revived more interest in the bus.

In 2010, Claire Ackermann of Switzerland drowned trying to cross the Teklanika River. She had tied herself to a rope spanning the fast-moving river, but lost her footing and drowned before she could be cut free. In 2019, Veranika Nikanava of Belarus also drowned while trying to cross the river while tied to a rope.

In June 2020, various government agencies coordinated a training mission with the Alaska Army National Guard to remove the bus, deemed a public safety hazard after the deaths of Ackermann and Nikanava and numerous visitor rescue incidents. It was flown out of the wilderness by a CH-47 Chinook helicopter to Healy. The Museum of The North at the University of Alaska in Fairbanks became the new home of Bus 142, where it would be conserved and an outdoor exhibit created.
