= Drooling =

Unintentional loss of saliva from the mouth

- Other names: Salivation, driveling, dribbling, slobbering, sialorrhea
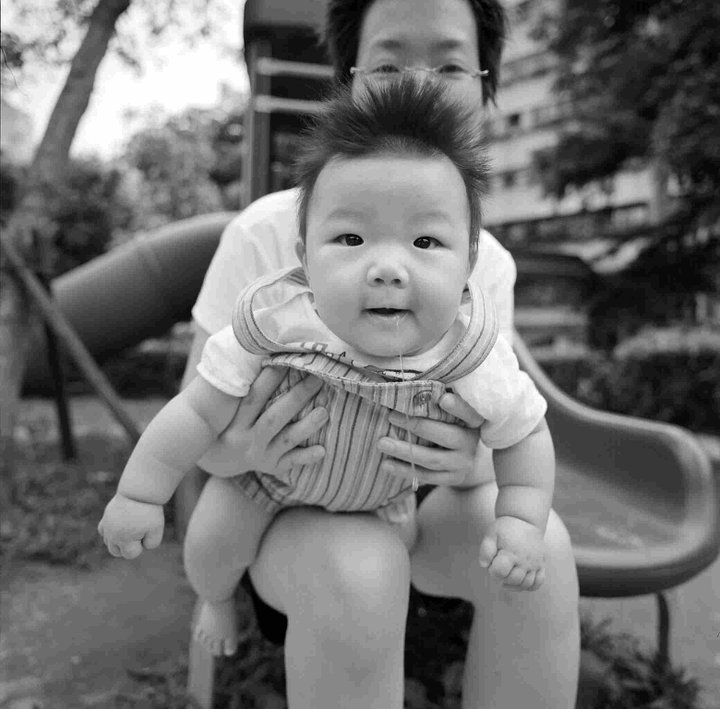
- A baby drooling

Drooling, salivating, or slobbering, is the flow of saliva outside the mouth. Drooling can be caused by excess production of saliva, inability to retain saliva within the mouth (incontinence of saliva), or problems with swallowing (dysphagia or odynophagia).

There are some frequent and harmless cases of drooling – for instance, a numbed mouth from either benzocaine, or when going to the dentist's office.

Isolated drooling in healthy infants and toddlers is normal and may be associated with teething. It is unlikely to be a sign of disease or complications. Drooling in infants and young children may be exacerbated by upper respiratory infections and nasal allergies.Some people with drooling problems are at increased risk of inhaling saliva, food, or fluids into the lungs, especially if drooling is secondary to a neurological problem. However, if the body's normal reflex mechanisms (such as gagging and coughing) are not impaired, this is not life-threatening.

== Causes ==
Smiley drooling during sleep

Drooling or sialorrhea can occur during sleep. It is often the result of open-mouth posture from CNS depressants intake or sleeping on one's side. Sometimes while sleeping, saliva does not build up at the back of the throat and does not trigger the normal swallow reflex, leading to the condition. Freud conjectured that drooling occurs during deep sleep, and within the first few hours of falling asleep, since those who are affected by the symptom experience the most severe harm while napping, rather than during overnight sleep.

A sudden onset of drooling may indicate poisoning – especially by pesticides or mercury – or reaction to snake or insect venom. Excess capsaicin can cause drooling as well, an example being the ingestion of particularly high Scoville Unit chili peppers. Some neurological problems cause drooling. Medication can cause drooling, either due to primary action or side-effects; for example the pain-relief medication Orajel can numb the mucosa.

Diseases (such as rabies) can cause saliva and air to mix, causing a condition colloquially known as "frothing at the mouth."

Causes include:

- exercise, especially cardiovascular exercise
- stroke and other neurological pathologies
- intellectual disability
- adenoid hypertrophy
- cerebral palsy
- amyotrophic lateral sclerosis
- tumors of the upper aerodigestive tract
- Parkinson's disease
- rabies
- mercury poisoning

Drooling associated with fever or trouble swallowing may be a sign of an infectious disease including:

- retropharyngeal abscess
- peritonsillar abscess
- tonsillitis
- mononucleosis
- strep throat
- obstructive diseases (tumors, stenosis)
- inability to swallow due to neurodegenerative diseases (amyotrophic lateral sclerosis)

== Treatment ==
A comprehensive treatment plan depends on the cause and incorporates several stages of care: Correction of reversible causes, behavior modification, medical treatment, and surgical procedures.

Atropine sulfate tablets are used in some circumstances to reduce salivation. The same for anticholinergic drugs which can be also a benefit because they decrease the activity of the acetylcholine muscarinic receptors and can result in decreased salivation. They may be prescribed by doctors in conjunction with behavior modification strategies. Other drugs used are glycopyrrolate and botulinum toxin A – botox injection in salivary glands to diminish saliva production.

In general, surgical procedures are considered after clear diagnosis of the cause and evaluation of non-invasive treatment options. Severe cases can be sometimes be treated by surgical intervention – salivary duct relocalization, or in extreme cases resection of salivary glands.

== Popular culture ==
Smiley drooling as a sign of desire

Increased production of saliva, for which drooling is a convenient visual representation, is an autonomic response to noticing (or thinking of) desirable food; cf. the adjective "mouthwatering". Based on this association, the scope of the meaning of the term drool in popular use has expanded to include any occasion wherein someone highly desires something.

== See also ==
- Slobbers
- Salivary microbiome
