= University of Alaska Museum of the North =

Museum in Fairbanks, Alaska

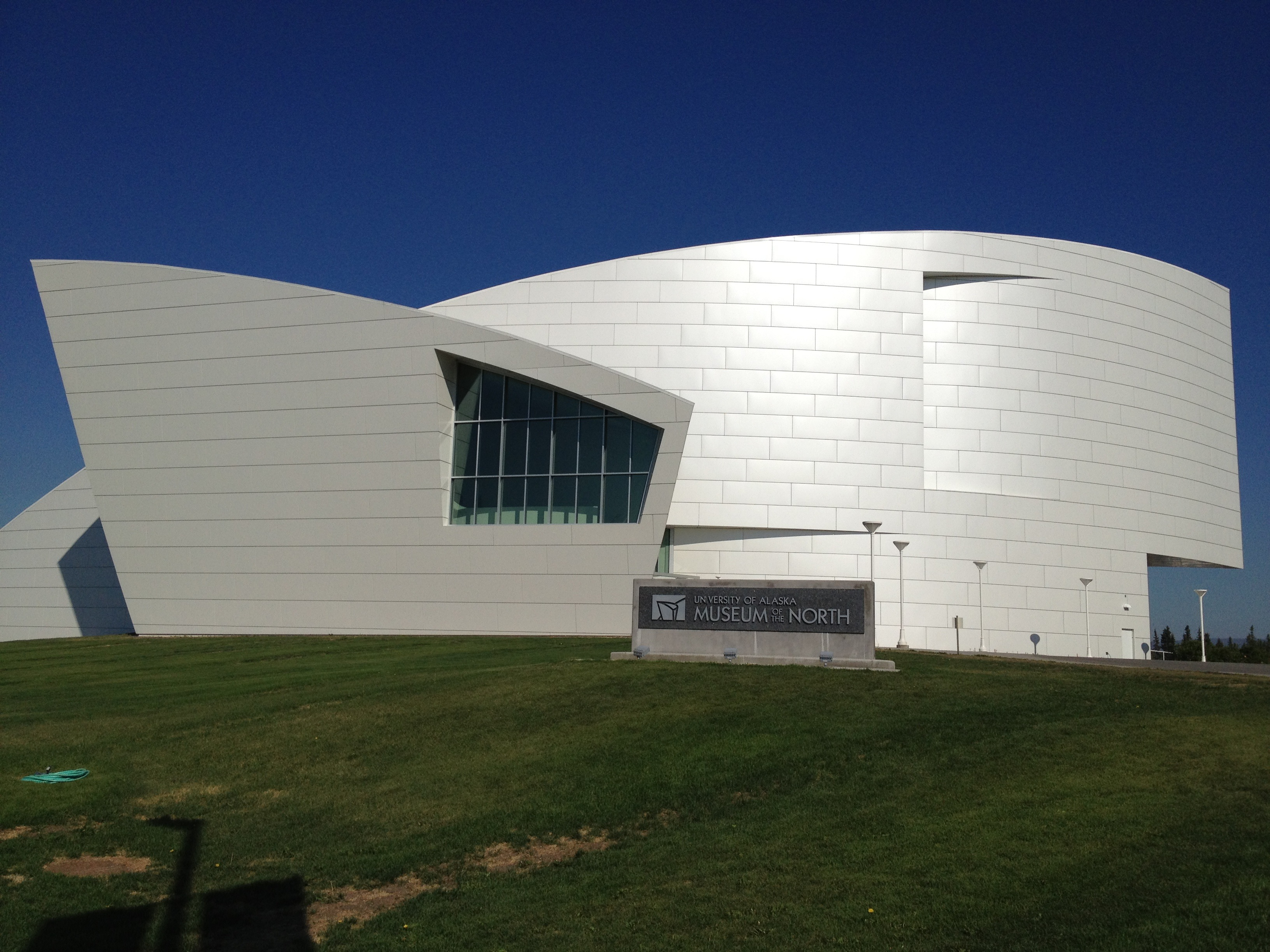
- Current museum building
- Interactive fullscreen map
- Established: 1926
- Location: Fairbanks, Alaska, United States
- Coordinates: 64.8585°N 147.8420°W
- Type: Natural, cultural, and art history museum
- Visitors: 93,000
- Director: Dr. Patrick Druckenmiller
- Public transit access: MACS Transit: Blue & Red Line
- Website: uaf.edu/museum

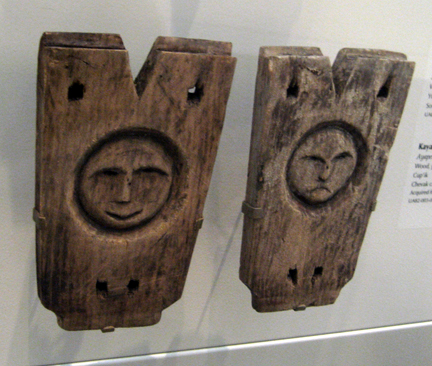
Cup'ik kayak stanchions in the museum collection, from Chevak. UA82-003-0057AB.

The University of Alaska Museum of the North (UAMN) is a multidisciplinary museum of natural, cultural, and art history located on the campus of the University of Alaska Fairbanks (UAF). It is the only research and teaching museum in Alaska accredited by the American Alliance of Museums. The museum serves as a cultural and scientific hub for Alaska and the Circumpolar North.

== Mission ==
The museum's mission is to acquire, conserve, investigate, and interpret specimens and collections relating to the natural, artistic, and cultural heritage of Alaska and the Circumpolar North. Through education, research, and public exhibits, the museum serves local, national, and international science programs. It develops and utilizes botanical, geological, zoological, and cultural collections to understand past and present issues unique to the North, while addressing future challenges such as biodiversity loss and climate change.

== Founding and history ==
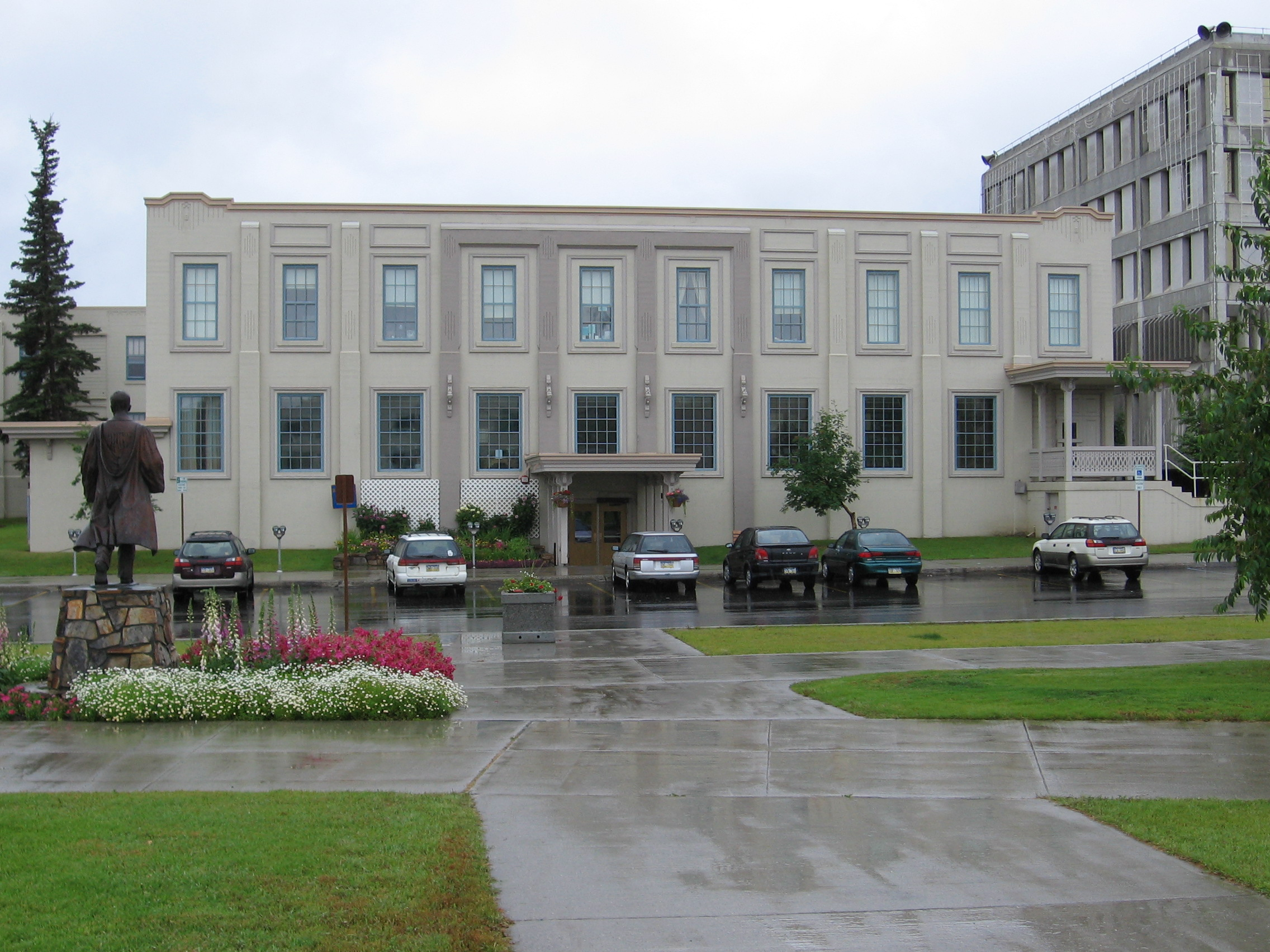
Signers' Hall at UAF. From the early 1960s to 1980 it was the home to the museum, before moving to the West Ridge of the campus.

The museum, formerly known as the University of Alaska Museum, was mandated as part of the original legislation establishing the university in 1917. In 1924, Charles E. Bunnell, then-president of the university, directed Otto Geist to collect items for display in the museum. Until 1936, the collection was scattered across several locations before being consolidated in what is now Signers' Hall.

Over time, the collections outgrew the available space. A capital campaign begun in 1975 led to the construction of a new facility designed by Joan Soranno of HGA Architects, noted for its angular design inspired by Alaska’s landscapes and auroras. The new building opened to the public in late 2005, with additional galleries opening in 2006.

In September 2020, the museum became the permanent home of Chris McCandless's final resting place, Bus 142, which had been removed from its location along the Stampede Trail in June of that year due to safety concerns.

== Collections ==
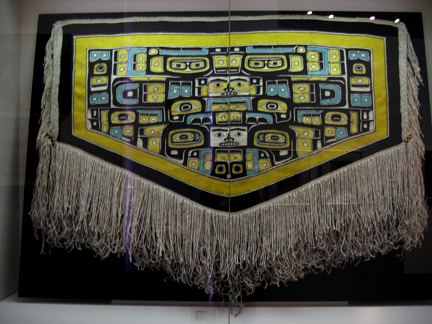
Tlingit Chilkat robe in the collection, from Klukwan. UA69-061-0001

The museum holds over 2.5 million artifacts and specimens across disciplines, including:

- Alaska Center for Documentary Film
- Alaska Frozen Tissue Collection – genetic samples for biodiversity research
- Archaeology Collection – over 1 million artifacts spanning 14,000 years
- Earth Sciences Collection – minerals, rocks, and fossils
- Entomology Collection – tens of thousands of Arctic insect species
- Ethnology & History Collection – 16,000 objects from Native Alaskan and early settler cultures
- Fine Arts Collection – Alaskan artists such as Sydney Laurence and Fred Machetanz
- Herbarium – Arctic plant specimens
- Mammal Collection – 40,000 specimens, one of the largest Arctic mammal collections worldwide
- Marine Invertebrates Collection – Arctic marine biodiversity samples
- Bird Collection – extensive ornithological specimens from across Alaska

== Notable exhibits ==
- Bus 142 (the Into the Wild bus): Preserved for outdoor display.
- Blue Babe: A 36,000-year-old mummified steppe bison excavated from Alaskan permafrost.
- Chilkat robe: A ceremonial Tlingit weaving from Klukwan.

== See also ==
- J. P. Hubrick – Photographer working in McCarthy, Alaska
- Brina Kessel – Curator of terrestrial vertebrates, 1972–1990; ornithology curator, 1990–1997
