= Ron Lamothe =

American film director

Ron Lamothe (born 1968) is a director of documentary films and the founder of Terra Incognita Films.

In 2000, Lamothe began pre-production on The Political Dr. Seuss, a documentary on the life and "political" works of Theodor Geisel. In 2004, the documentary aired nationwide on PBS as the season premiere of Independent Lens. It was subsequently nominated for a George Foster Peabody Award in documentary television.

Starting in 2005, Lamothe spent two years shooting and editing his next documentary, The Call of the Wild, on the self-proclaimed "aesthetic voyager" Christopher McCandless, a filmmaking odyssey that took him through thirty U.S. states, two Canadian provinces, and parts of Mexico.

== Filmography ==
- The Call of the Wild (2007)
- The Political Dr. Seuss (2004)
