= Slafractonia leguminicola =

Scientific classification
- Kingdom: Fungi
- Division: Ascomycota
- Class: Dothideomycetes
- Order: Pleosporales
- Family: incertae sedis
- Genus: Slafractonia
- Species: S. leguminicola

Binomial name
- Slafractonia leguminicola (Gough & E.S. Elliott) Alhawatema, Baucom, Sanogo & Creamer, (2016)

Species of fungus

Slafractonia leguminicola (formerly Rhizoctonia leguminicola) is a fungus that is a plant pathogen that most often attaches itself to the Trifolium pratense or red clover. It is also called black patch disease. The infection is first seen as small black patches on the leaves of red clover (often on the bottom of the leaves first) and spreads to cover the entire plant, killing it. The hyphae of this fungus are white and web-like in appearance, just like those of other fungi. The consumption of the fungus can be harmful to any grazing animals, especially to horses and cows.

== Effects of consumption ==
If Slafractonia leguminicola is consumed excessively by horses or cattle, the most noticeable symptom will be an increase in salivation (drool). Other symptoms include "eye discharge, bloat, frequent urination, watery diarrhea, reduced milk production, weight loss and abortion." The consumption must be exorbitant to cause these symptoms in such large animals, but if the pasture consists mainly of clover, and the hay also contains clover, the danger of more serious symptoms rises. This is known as slobbers, also slobbers syndrome, and is attributed in part to the alkaloid toxins slaframine and swainsonine.
