= Carthage, South Dakota =

- City
- Location in Miner County and the state of South Dakota

- Location within the United States
- Coordinates: 44°10′07″N 97°42′54″W
- Country: United States
- State: South Dakota
- County: Miner
- Incorporated: 1898
- Elevation: 1,431 ft (436 m)

Population (2020)
  - Total: 127
  - Density: 87.0/sq mi (33.59/km^{2})
- Time zone: UTC-6 (Central (CST))
  - Summer (DST): UTC-5 (CDT)
- ZIP code: 57323
- Area code: 605
- FIPS code: 46-10220
- GNIS feature ID: 1267311
- Website: www.carthagesd.net

Carthage is a city in Miner County, South Dakota, United States. The population was 127 at the 2020 census.

== History ==
Carthage was platted in 1883. It was named after Carthage, New York.

== Geography ==
According to the United States Census Bureau, the city has a total area of 1.49 square miles (3.86 km^{2}), of which 1.46 square miles (3.78 km^{2}) is land and 0.03 square miles (0.08 km^{2}) is water.

== Demographics ==
Historical population
Census	Pop.	Note	%±
1890	200		—
1900	265		32.5%
1910	554		109.1%
1920	667		20.4%
1930	590		−11.5%
1940	512		−13.2%
1950	458		−10.5%
1960	368		−19.7%
1970	362		−1.6%
1980	274		−24.3%
1990	221		−19.3%
2000	187		−15.4%
2010	144		−23.0%
2020	127		−11.8%
U.S. Decennial Census

=== 2020 census ===
As of the 2020 census, Carthage had a population of 127. The median age was 47.3 years. 21.3% of residents were under the age of 18 and 33.9% of residents were 65 years of age or older. For every 100 females there were 95.4 males, and for every 100 females age 18 and over there were 88.7 males age 18 and over.

0.0% of residents lived in urban areas, while 100.0% lived in rural areas.

There were 65 households in Carthage, of which 23.1% had children under the age of 18 living in them. Of all households, 35.4% were married-couple households, 29.2% were households with a male householder and no spouse or partner present, and 30.8% were households with a female householder and no spouse or partner present. About 47.7% of all households were made up of individuals and 38.4% had someone living alone who was 65 years of age or older.

There were 126 housing units, of which 48.4% were vacant. The homeowner vacancy rate was 5.2% and the rental vacancy rate was 16.7%.

Racial composition as of the 2020 census
Race	Number	Percent
White	120	94.5%
Black or African American	0	0.0%
American Indian and Alaska Native	2	1.6%
Asian	1	0.8%
Native Hawaiian and Other Pacific Islander	0	0.0%
Some other race	1	0.8%
Two or more races	3	2.4%
Hispanic or Latino (of any race)	2	1.6%

=== 2010 census ===
As of the census of 2010, there were 144 people, 80 households, and 37 families residing in the city. The population density was 98.6 inhabitants per square mile (38.1/km^{2}). There were 136 housing units at an average density of 93.2 per square mile (36.0/km^{2}). The racial makeup of the city was 96.5% White, 0.7% Asian, and 2.8% from two or more races.

There were 80 households, of which 15.0% had children under the age of 18 living with them, 36.3% were married couples living together, 8.8% had a female householder with no husband present, 1.3% had a male householder with no wife present, and 53.8% were non-families. 46.3% of all households were made up of individuals, and 21.3% had someone living alone who was 65 years of age or older. The average household size was 1.80 and the average family size was 2.46.

The median age in the city was 52.3 years. 16% of residents were under the age of 18; 5.7% were between the ages of 18 and 24; 18.2% were from 25 to 44; 34.7% were from 45 to 64; and 25.7% were 65 years of age or older. The gender makeup of the city was 50.7% male and 49.3% female.

=== 2000 census ===
At the 2000 census, there were 187 people, 98 households and 52 families residing in the city. The population density was 128.1 inhabitants per square mile (49.5/km^{2}). There were 143 housing units at an average density of 98.0 per square mile (37.8/km^{2}). The racial makeup of the city was 98.93% White, and 1.07% from two or more races.

There were 98 households, of which 14.3% had children under the age of 18 living with them, 49.0% were married couples living together, 4.1% had a female householder with no husband present, and 46.9% were non-families. 43.9% of all households were made up of individuals, and 28.6% had someone living alone who was 65 years of age or older. The average household size was 1.91 and the average family size was 2.63.

Age distribution was 16.0% under the age of 18, 6.4% from 18 to 24, 16.0% from 25 to 44, 26.2% from 45 to 64, and 35.3% who were 65 years of age or older. The median age was 51 years. For every 100 females, there were 98.9 males. For every 100 females age 18 and over, there were 84.7 males.

The median household income was $27,679, and the median family income was $32,917. Males had a median income of $26,750 versus $15,938 for females. The per capita income for the city was $15,100. About 13.2% of families and 17.4% of the population were below the poverty line, including 40.0% of those under the age of eighteen and 12.1% of those 65 or over.

== Notable people ==
- Paul A. Magnuson, United States district judge
- Chris McCandless, worked at a grain elevator and lived here in 1991.
