= Teklanika River =

River in Alaska

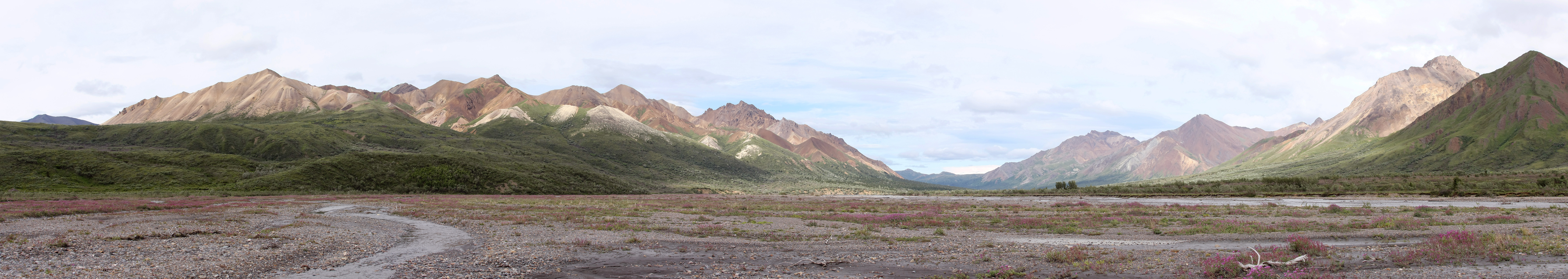
- Teklanika River Valley in Denali National Park and Preserve

- Location of the mouth of the Teklanika River in Alaska
- Native name: Tach'edhaneek'a (Lower Tanana)

Location
- Country: United States
- State: Alaska
- District: Denali Borough, Yukon–Koyukuk Census Area

Physical characteristics
- Source: Cantwell Glacier in Denali National Park
  - location: Alaska Range, Denali Borough
  - coordinates: 63°27′18″N 149°28′59″W
  - elevation: 4,370 ft (1,330 m)
- Mouth: Nenana River
  - location: 10 miles (16 km) southwest of Nenana, Yukon–Koyukuk Census Area
  - coordinates: 64°28′15″N 149°19′02″W
  - elevation: 413 ft (126 m)
- Length: 90 mi (140 km)

The Teklanika River (Lower Tanana: Tach'edhaneek'a) is a 91-mile (146 km) tributary of the Nenana River in the U.S. state of Alaska. The Nenana is a tributary of the Tanana River, which is part of the Yukon River drainage in the central interior region of the state. Flowing northward from headwaters at the Cantwell Glacier in the Alaska Range, the Teklanika drains an area widely visited by tourists to Denali National Park and Preserve. The park's only road crosses the river at milepost 31 and a National Park campground is located on its eastern bank at milepost 29.

On its course, the river travels north from the core Alaska Range as a braided river, becoming rapid and narrow as it traverses through the Primrose Ridge, braiding again through the Stampede Trail valley, narrowing again through the Tekla Ridge before ultimately meandering through a complex series of oxbow turns and lakes across the southern Tanana River valley.

The river is crossed by the Denali Park Road and the Stampede Trail, and was heavily prospected in the early 20th century for the many coal, gold, and platinum deposits found along its banks.

The name derives from the Lower Tanana (Athabascan) words meaning "water-amulet river".

== Popular culture ==
In the book Into the Wild, the Teklanika River is referred to as the Rubicon for American adventurer Christopher McCandless. Since then, the river has proven an occasionally deadly obstacle to hikers attempting to reach the bus where McCandless camped out and later died of starvation.

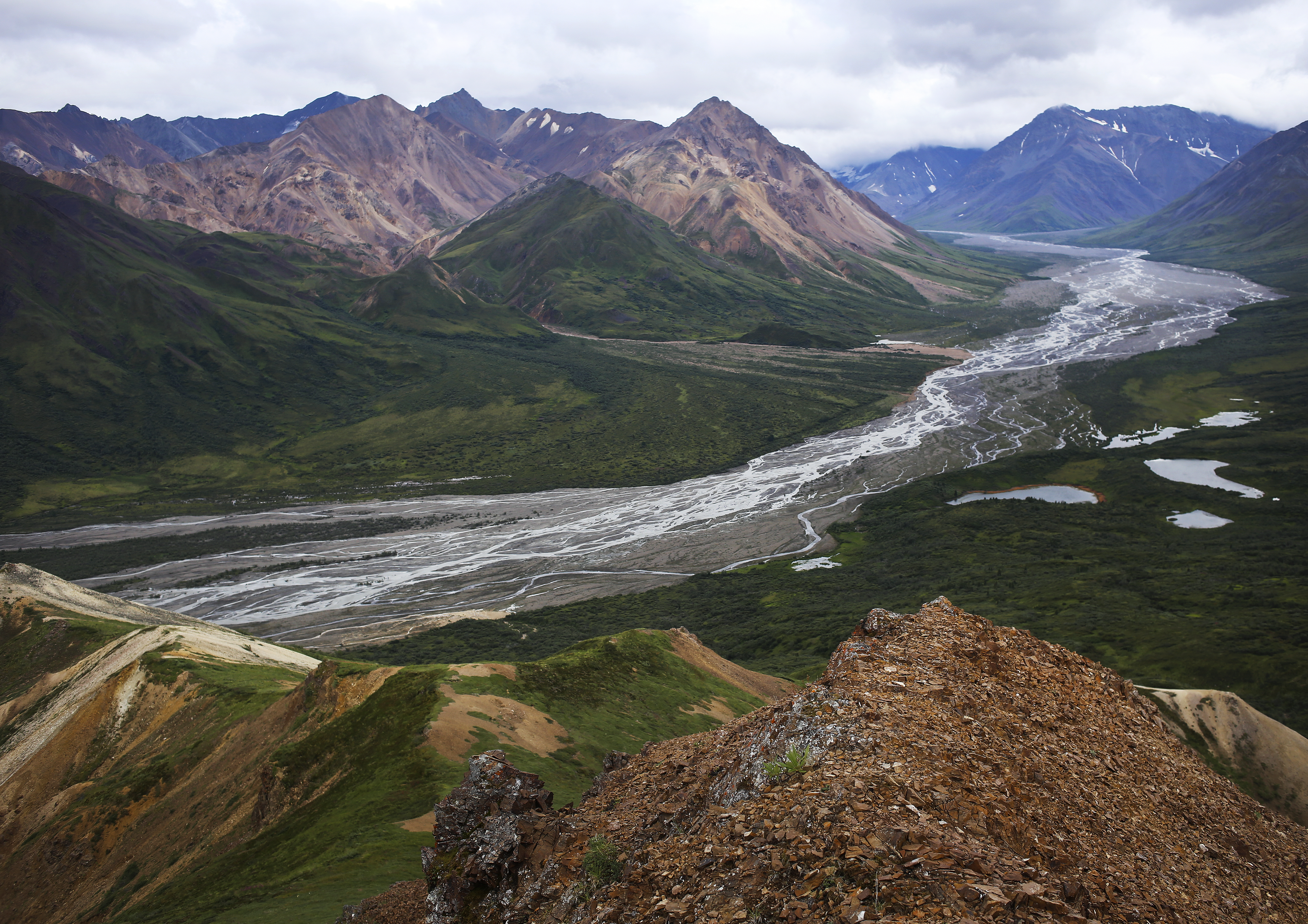
Teklanika River seen from the backside of Cathedral Mountain

In August 2010, a Swiss hiker, Claire Ackermann, drowned in an attempt to cross the river while tied off to a rope that was strung by previous hikers between trees on both shores. While she drowned on state land, her body was pulled ashore by her French boyfriend a short distance downriver. That point was on Denali National Park land, triggering a dispute between Park Rangers and State Troopers as to jurisdiction.

== See also ==
- List of rivers of Alaska
