= Everett Ruess =

American writer, artist and explorer, missing since 1934

- Born: March 28, 1914; Oakland, California, U.S.
- Disappeared: c. November 1934 (aged 20); Escalante, Utah, U.S.
- Status: Presumed dead
- Occupations: Printmaker, artist, writer

Everett Ruess (March 28, 1914 – c. November 1934) was an American artist, poet, and writer. He carried out solo explorations of the High Sierra, the California coast, and the deserts of the American Southwest. In 1934, he disappeared while traveling through a remote area of Utah; his fate remains unknown.

== Biography ==
=== Early life ===
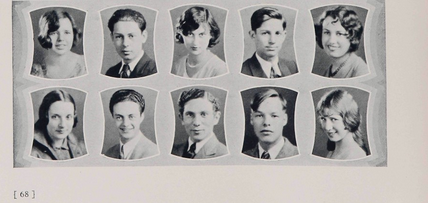
Yearbook Photo Winter 1931. Ruess is bottom row, second from the right.

Everett Ruess was the younger of two sons of Stella and Christopher Ruess. Christopher was a Unitarian minister whose work caused the family to move every few years. Everett's older brother, Waldo, was born on September 5, 1909. A precocious child, Everett began woodcarving, modeling in clay, and sketching at an early age. At 12, he was writing essays and verse, and began a literary diary that eventually grew into volumes, with pages telling of his travels, thoughts, and works. By 1920, the Ruess family was living in Brookline, Massachusetts, and by 1930, they were living at 836 North Kingsley Drive in Los Angeles. Everett took a creative-writing class at Los Angeles High School, and later won a poetry award at Valparaiso High School in Indiana. At Hollywood High School he served as the Secretary-Treasurer of the Tabard Folk, the school's literary club. That year, he published an original poem in the yearbook, titled "Lonesome". In 1931, he served as vice president of the school's civic club.

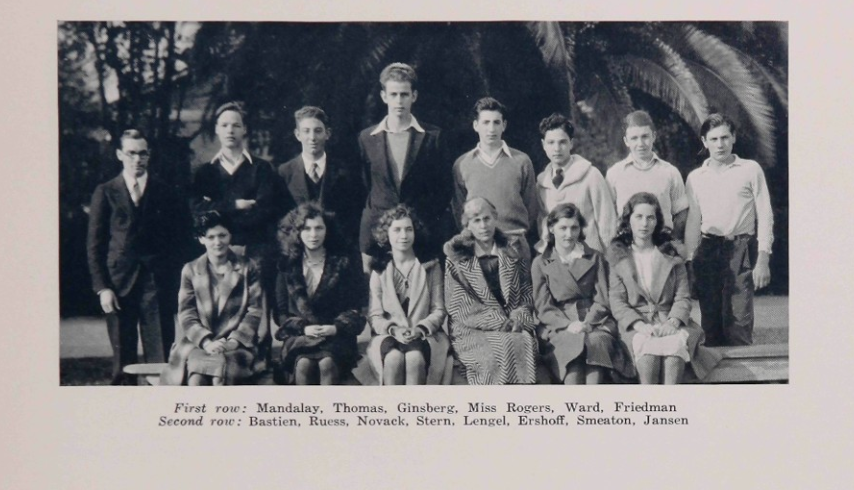
Group Photo Of Tabard Folk 1930

=== Travels ===
Starting in 1931, Ruess traveled by horse and donkey through Arizona, New Mexico, Utah, and Colorado, exploring the high desert of the Colorado Plateau. He rode broncos, branded calves, and investigated cliff dwellings. Ruess explored Sequoia and Yosemite National Parks, as well as the High Sierra in the summers of 1930 and 1933. In 1934, he worked with University of California archaeologists near Kayenta, took part in a Hopi religious ceremony, and learned to speak Navajo. Ruess had limited success trading his prints and watercolors to pay his way, and primarily relied on his parents' support.

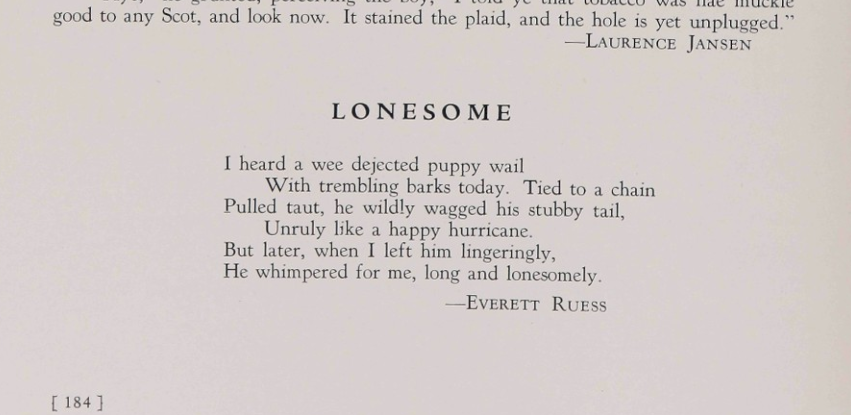
Poem Lonesome

=== Disappearance ===
On November 20, 1934, Ruess set out alone into the Utah desert, taking two donkeys as pack animals. He was never seen again.

Earlier in 1934, Ruess had told his parents he would be unreachable for nearly two months, but about three months after his last correspondence, they started receiving their son's uncalled-for mail. They wrote a letter to the post office of Escalante, Utah, on February 7, 1935. A commissioner of Garfield County, H. Jennings Allen (the husband of Escalante's postmistress), saw the letter and decided to form a search party with other men in the area. Ruess' donkeys were found near the north side of Davis Gulch, a canyon of the Escalante River. The only sign of Ruess himself was a corral he had made at his campsite in Davis Gulch, as well as an inscription the search party found nearby, with the words "NEMO 1934". Allen reported the discovery of the donkeys and the inscription to Ruess' parents in a letter dated March 8, 1935. On March 15, after completing a last attempt to find Ruess in the Kaiparowits Plateau, Allen wrote a final note to the family calling an end to the search efforts.

Later searches in late May and June 1935 included an aerial survey of the land from an altitude of 12,000 feet (3,700 m), covering the ground from Lee's Ferry to Escalante. On the ground, a party of nine horseback riders joined the search, but discontinued their effort a week later.

Some believe Ruess may have fallen off a cliff or drowned in a flash flood; others suspected that he had been murdered.

=== 2009 DNA tests ===
The discovery of a grave site on Comb Ridge, near the town of Bluff, Utah, added to the mystery. An elderly Navajo claimed that Ruess was murdered by two Ute men who wanted his donkeys. Bones and teeth found in the grave allegedly matched Ruess' race, age, size, and facial features. In April 2009, comparison of DNA from the remains and that of Ruess' nieces and nephew, and comparison of the skull to photographs, seemed to confirm that the remains were those of Ruess. Two months later, Kevin Jones, state archaeologist of Utah, advised that the remains were probably not Ruess's, since dental records from the 1930s did not match those in published photographs of the body.

On October 21, 2009, the Associated Press reported that DNA tests conducted by the Armed Forces Institute of Pathology concluded that the remains were not those of Ruess. They identified them as being likely of Native American origin. A later article in National Geographic Adventure Magazine identified problems in the DNA matching software as the source of the error.

== Works ==
Ruess was known for making linoleum prints of landscapes and nature, and was associated with Ansel Adams and Dorothea Lange. His prints show scenes from the Monterey Bay coast, the northern California coast near Tomales Bay, the Sierra Nevada, Utah, and Arizona.

Ruess wrote no books during his life, but he was a lifelong diarist, and sent home hundreds of letters. His journals and poetry were posthumously published in two books, both illustrated with his own woodcuts:

- Lacy, Hugh, ed. (1940). On Desert Trails. El Centro, California: Desert Magazine Press.
- Rusho, W.L. (1983). Everett Ruess: Vagabond for Beauty. Peregrine Smith Books.

Ruess's story, along with that of Christopher McCandless, was retold more briefly in Jon Krakauer's 1996 book Into the Wild. He is also mentioned in Edward Abbey's 1968 book Desert Solitaire. Wallace Stegner, in his 1942 book, Mormon Country, devotes an entire chapter, "Artist in Residence...", pages 319-350, to Ruess's travels and disappearance in southern Utah.

Everett's last letter to his brother, Waldo, said:

… as to when I revisit civilization, it will not be soon. I have not tired of the wilderness… It is enough that I am surrounded with beauty… This had been a full, rich year. I have left no strange or delightful thing undone I wanted to do.

Ruess disappeared before his last letters could be sent from Escalante and his 1934 diary was never found.

== In popular culture ==
- California musician Dave Alvin wrote and performed a song about Ruess on the album Ashgrove.
- A species of dinosaur, Seitaad ruessi, from the Lower Jurassic of Utah, was named in honor of Ruess by J.J.W. Sertich and M. Loewen, in 2010.

== See also ==
- Lillian Alling, who trekked (largely by foot) across the US and Canada toward the Bering Strait and the Soviet Union, attempting a return to her homeland in Eastern Europe in the late 1920s
- Christopher Thomas Knight
- Christopher McCandless, subject of Jon Krakauer's book Into the Wild, later adapted into a 2007 film by Sean Penn
- Carl McCunn, wildlife photographer who became stranded in the Alaskan wilderness, and eventually committed suicide when he ran out of supplies
- Lars Monsen, Norwegian adventurer and TV personality who once travelled by foot, canoe, and dog sled from the east coast of Canada to the west coast, which took over two years to complete
- Dan O'Neill (writer)
- Timothy Treadwell
- Velma Wallis
- Ed Wardle, who documented his solo wilderness adventure in the 2009 television series Alone in the Wild
- List of people who disappeared mysteriously: 1910–1990
