= 25zero =

Environmental awareness project and film

25zero is a mountaineering project, tracking equatorial glacial melt and raising awareness of the impacts of climate change, led by explorer Tim Jarvis AM. The project was founded in 2014, and focussed on bringing live footage from the peaks of three mountain glaciers to the 37,000 delegates at the COP21 summit in 2015 in Paris, France, as a way of showcasing the impact of global warming on vulnerable and remote areas.

In 2016 the 25zero project grew into a documentary film production, with a broader focus on both the glaciers themselves and the communities that live near them. The resulting 15-minute short film, entitled 25zero//East Africa, was released in 2019.

== Naming the project ==
While many mountains straddle the equator, only 25 of these have a glacier at their peak (defined at the time of the United Nations Framework Convention on Climate Change adoption in 1992); hence, 25 mountains at zero latitude. In reality, however, there are about three degrees (some 320 km) of leniency in the inclusions, both North and South. Additionally, the name wordplays on estimates that within an average of 25 years, all these glaciers will have retreated to zero ice.

According to the project team, this is important because melting ice is an excellent proxy indicator for climate change impacts. While much of the public global interest centres around ice-melt at the Earth's poles, relatively little attention is given to the ice at more unexpected locations, such as in the high-altitude tropics.

Since 1992, four of the 25 mountains originally included have 'lost' their glacier completely.

== Methodology ==
The notional baseline date for mountains included in the 25zero project are those mountains that had glaciers in 1992, when the UN started to "began to take climate change (and acting on it) seriously". After several years of UNFCCC processes, the Kyoto Protocol was signed in 1997. Around that time, 25 mountains at the equator had glaciers. The project uses climbing expeditions to the various mountain ranges to support published glaciology data, effectively tracking the status of the equatorial glaciers against the backdrop of the UN timeline on climate change action.

== Climbing team ==
The 25zero climbing team has varied over time depending on the expedition, although the original 2014 team comprised:

- Tim Jarvis
- Ed Wardle
- Heidi Sand
- Vanessa O'Brien
- Khoo Swee Chiow
- Barry 'Baz' Gray

The up-to-date team are listed on the project website, 25zero.

== Mountains ==
While the 25zero mountains are spread around the world, more than half of them are located in the South American Andes mountain range, and chiefly in Ecuador.

=== Ecuador ===
- Antisana
- Carihuairazo
- Cayambe
- Cerro Ayapungo
- Cerro Hermoso
- Chimborazo
- Collay
- Cotopaxi
- El Altar
- Illiniza Sur
- Quilindaña
- Sangay
- Saraurcu
- Sincholagua

=== Colombia ===
- Nevado de Santa Isabel
- Nevado del Huila
- Nevado del Quindío
- Nevado del Ruiz
- Nevado del Tolima

=== Kenya ===
- Mount Kenya

=== Uganda ===
- Mount Stanley
- Mount Speke
- Mount Baker

=== Tanzania ===
- Mount Kilimanjaro

=== Indonesia ===
- Carstensz Pyramid

Additionally, the project lists a number of 'recently deceased' glaciers, which it defines as no longer being able to detect permanent glacial ice. These three are all in Ecuador:

- Cubillín
- Cotacachi
- Tungurahua

== Glacier status ==
Mountain	Country	Glacier in 1992?	Glacier in 2017?
Carstenz Pyramid	Indonesia	Yes	Yes
Mount Stanley	Uganda	Yes	Yes
Mount Baker	Uganda	Yes	Yes
Mount Speke	Uganda	Yes	Yes
Mount Kilimanjaro	Tanzania	Yes	Yes
Mount Kenya	Kenya	Yes	Yes
Illiniza Sur	Ecuador	Yes	Yes
Carihuairazo	Ecuador	Yes	Yes
Chimborazo	Ecuador	Yes	Yes
Cayambe	Ecuador	Yes	Yes
Antisana	Ecuador	Yes	Yes
Cotopaxi	Ecuador	Yes	Yes
El Altar	Ecuador	Yes	Yes
Saraurcu	Ecuador	Yes	Yes, but very small glacier
Sangay	Ecuador	Yes	Yes, probable partial glacier cover, and others mention only névé (perennial snow or firn) that persists for several years
Tungurahua	Ecuador	Yes	Yes, a small summit glacier under ash (some say it melted away after an eruption in 1999)
Cerro Hermoso	Ecuador	Yes, although tiny (0.02 km^{2})	No
Cotocachi	Ecuador	Yes, although tiny (0.06 km^{2})	No
Quilindaña	Ecuador	Yes, although tiny (0.06 km^{2})	No
Sincholagua	Ecuador	Yes (0.18 km^{2})	No, still has some ice, however, not a glacier; just névé for past two decades
Nevado del Ruiz	Colombia	Yes	Yes
Nevado de Santa Isabel	Colombia	Yes	Yes
Nevado del Tolima	Colombia	Yes	Yes
Nevado del Huila	Colombia	Yes	Yes
Nevado del Quindío	Colombia	Yes	Yes
Cerro Ayapungo	Ecuador	Yes	
Collay	Ecuador	Yes	
Cubillín	Ecuador	Yes	

According to some glaciologists, contradictory information exists in the literature as to whether glaciers on Sangay and Cerro Ayapungo (locally known as Soroche) are true glaciers or only permanent snow (névé or firn).

== The climbs ==
=== 2015 ===
In December 2015, to coincide with the COP21 climate change talks in Paris, multiple 25zero teams scaled a number of the 25zero peaks. Jarvis and a core team summited Carstensz Pyramid (4,884 m) in Indonesia, and Mount Stanley (5,109 m) and Mount Baker (4,844 m) in Uganda. Simultaneously, other 25zero teams climbed Mount Kenya (5,199 m), Kilimanjaro (5,895 m) and a number of Ecuadorian peaks. Footage, observations and stories from these climbs were transmitted to a government-endorsed press conference for 25zero at COP21 in Paris.

=== 2016 ===
In 2016, Jarvis and colleague Royal Marines Sergeant Major Barry Gray went on an information-gathering and mountain-climbing expedition to Ecuador for the 25zero project. They successfully summited three glaciated mountains in Ecuador: Illiniza Sur (5,248 m), Antisana (5,704 m) and Chimborazo (6,310 m). The trip coincided with the ongoing UN climate change talks in Marrakech (COP22).

=== 2017 ===
In September 2017, Jarvis together with Ecuadorian climbers Edgar Parra and Ethan Sigle summited Carihuazo (5,018 m), and climbed and documented glacier decline on Cayambe (5,790 m) and Cotopaxi (5,897 m).

=== 2018 ===
In June 2018, Jarvis assembled a large climbing team, including a film crew and several social media and mountaineering identities, to undertake climbs in East Africa, including Kilimanjaro, Mount Speke, and Mount Stanley.

== Awards ==
25zero (and the project team) has received a number of awards for contribution to conservation and public education.

=== Australian Geographic Society, 2016 ===
The project has received citation through the annual awards of the Australian Geographic Society, with project leader Tim Jarvis receiving the title of Conservationist of the Year in 2016, for his work on 25zero. The Society had also supported the expedition.

=== Bettison-James Award, 2016 ===
Jarvis was jointly awarded the Jim Bettison and Helen James Award in 2016 in recognition of the 25zero project. The award is patronised by the Jim Bettison and Helen James Foundation and administered by the Adelaide Film Festival and the Adelaide Festival of Ideas, recognising "lifelong high achievement in an area of expertise and enable further work of benefit to the community".
