= Timothy Treadwell =

American bear enthusiast and documentary filmmaker (1957–2003)

- Born: Timothy William Dexter; April 29, 1957; Mineola, New York, U.S.
- Died: October 5, 2003 (aged 46); Katmai National Park, Alaska, U.S.
- Cause of death: Fatal bear attack
- Occupations: Environmentalist; Naturalist; Documentary filmmaker
- Years active: 1990–2003

Timothy Treadwell (born Timothy William Dexter; April 29, 1957 – October 5, 2003) was an American bear enthusiast, environmentalist, documentary filmmaker, and founder of the bear-protection organization Grizzly People. He lived among coastal brown bears (Ursus arctos gyas) in Katmai National Park, Alaska, for 13 summers.

On October 5, 2003, Treadwell and his girlfriend Amie Huguenard were killed and almost fully eaten by a 28-year-old male bear whose stomach was later found to contain human remains and clothing.

Treadwell's life, work, and death were the subject of Werner Herzog's critically acclaimed documentary film Grizzly Man (2005).

== Early life and education ==
Timothy William Dexter was born on April 29, 1957, in Mineola, Long Island, New York, one of five children of Val Dexter and Carol Ann (née Bartell). He attended Connetquot High School, where he was the swimming team's star diver. He was very fond of animals and kept a squirrel named Willie as a pet. In an interview in Grizzly Man (2005), his parents say he was an ordinary young man until he went away to college. He attended Bradley University on a swimming and diving scholarship. There, he claimed to be a British orphan and on other occasions claimed that he was from Australia. Following two years on the dive team, where he set the university's three-meter springboard records, he eventually dropped out of school.

After college, Treadwell moved to Los Angeles to pursue an acting career, and appeared on an episode of the dating show Love Connection. His father said Treadwell "spiraled down" and developed an alcohol abuse disorder after he lost the role of Woody Boyd to Woody Harrelson in the sitcom Cheers. In 1987, he legally changed his surname from Dexter to Treadwell, a name from his mother's family that he had used informally for some years.

== Alaskan expeditions ==
A lover of animals since he was a child, Treadwell decided to travel to Alaska to watch bears after a close friend persuaded him to do so. According to his book, Among Grizzlies: Living with Wild Bears in Alaska, his mission to protect bears began in the late 1980s after he had survived a near-fatal heroin overdose. He wrote that after his first encounter with a wild bear, he knew he had found his calling in life, and that his destiny was entwined with those of the bears. He attributed his recovery from drug and alcohol addictions entirely to his relationship with bears.

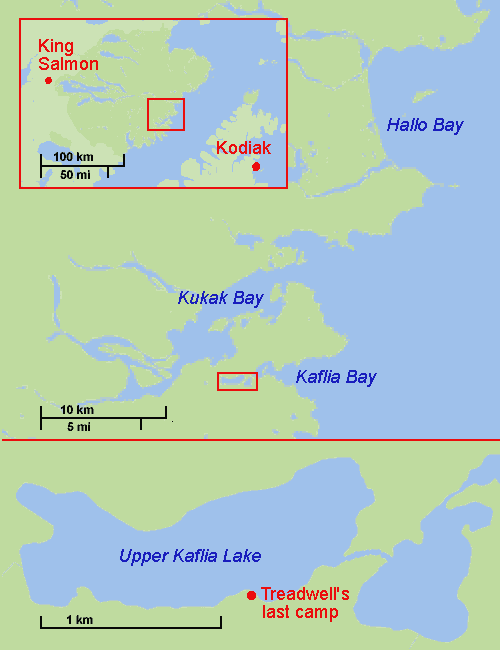
From Grizzly Sanctuary to Grizzly Maze

Treadwell spent the early part of each season camping on the 'Big Green', an open area of bear grass in Hallo Bay on the Katmai Coast. He called the area the "Grizzly Sanctuary". He was known for getting extremely close to the bears he observed, sometimes even touching them and playing with bear cubs. In his book, he claimed that he was always careful with the bears and actually developed a sense of mutual trust and respect with the animals. He habitually named the bears he encountered and consistently saw many of the same bears each summer and thus claimed to be building a standing relationship with them. He would also do the same with foxes, feeding them until gaining their trust enough for the foxes to approach him.

During the latter part of each summer, he would move to Kaflia Bay and camp in an area of especially thick brush he called the "Grizzly Maze", which intersected with bear trails and afforded him a much greater chance of crossing paths with wild bears. He recorded almost 100 hours of video footage (some of which was later used to create the documentary Grizzly Man) and produced a large collection of still photographs.

But Treadwell's years with the bears were not without disruption. Almost from the start, the National Park Service (NPS) expressed their worries about his behavior. The park's restrictions made him increasingly irate. According to the file kept on Treadwell by the NPS, rangers reported he had at least six violations from 1994 to 2003. Included among these violations were guiding tourists without a license, camping in the same area longer than the NPS's seven-day limit, improper food storage, wildlife harassment, and conflicts with visitors and their guides. Treadwell also frustrated authorities by refusing to install an electric fence around his camp and refusing to carry bear spray to use as a deterrent. In his 1997 book, Treadwell related a story where he resorted to using bear mace on one occasion, but added that he had felt terrible grief over the pain he perceived it had caused the bear and refused to use it on subsequent occasions.

By 2001, Treadwell became sufficiently notable to receive extensive media attention both on television and in environmental circles, and he made frequent public appearances as an environmental activist. He traveled throughout the United States to educate school children about bears and appeared on the Discovery Channel, the Late Show with David Letterman, and Dateline NBC to discuss his experiences.

He also cowrote Among Grizzlies: Living with Wild Bears in Alaska with Jewel Palovak (his coworker with whom he lived for 20 years), which describes Treadwell's adventures on the Alaska Peninsula. Treadwell and Palovak founded Grizzly People, an organization devoted to protecting bears and preserving their wilderness habitat.

Treadwell claimed to be alone with the wildlife on several occasions in his videos; however, his girlfriend, Amie, can be heard behind the camera in much of the footage he took for his documentary during his last three summers. Other women Treadwell dated, who have remained anonymous, also accompanied him on some expeditions.

Naturalist Charlie Russell, who studied bears, raised them, and lived with them for a decade in Kamchatka, Russia, worked with Treadwell. Russell advised Treadwell to carry pepper spray and use electric fences. After Werner Herzog's documentary Grizzly Man was released, he wrote a lengthy critique of Treadwell's failure to follow basic safety precautions. In spite of his criticism of Treadwell, Russell praised him for his devotion to bears and his ability to remain alive for so long. He defended him against people who criticized his work, writing, "If Timothy had spent those 13 years killing bears and guiding others to do the same, eventually being killed by one, he would have been remembered in Alaska with great admiration." Russell was critical of Grizzly Man, saying it was unfair to Treadwell, and if Palovak "really was a protector of bears, she should have looked for a filmmaker who would have been sympathetic towards them."

== Death ==
In October 2003, Treadwell and his girlfriend, physician assistant Amie Huguenard (born October 23, 1965, in Buffalo, New York), visited Katmai National Park on the Alaskan Peninsula across Shelikof Strait from Kodiak Island. In Grizzly Man, Werner Herzog states that Treadwell had written in his diaries that Huguenard feared bears and felt very uncomfortable in their presence. Her final journal entries indicated that she wanted to be away from Katmai. Treadwell set his campsite near a salmon stream where wild bears commonly feed in autumn. He was in the park later in the year than normal, at a time when bears attempt to gain as much fat as possible before winter. Food was scarce that autumn, causing the bears to be even more aggressive than usual.

Treadwell and Huguenard had planned to leave the park at his usual time of year, and had returned to Kodiak on September 26 to store their gear for the season and catch a connecting flight to return to their home in California. After an argument with the airline ticketer over the price of altering his return ticket, Treadwell and Huguenard made the decision to return to their campsite on September 29 for an additional week. Treadwell also wanted to locate a favorite female brown bear about which he was concerned. The bears he was familiar with during the summer had already gone into torpor, and bears from other parts of the park that did not know Treadwell were moving into the area.

Some of the last footage taken by Treadwell hours before his death includes video of a bear diving into the river repeatedly for a piece of dead salmon. He mentioned in the footage that he did not feel entirely comfortable around that particular bear. In Grizzly Man, Herzog speculates on whether Treadwell filmed the very bear who killed him.

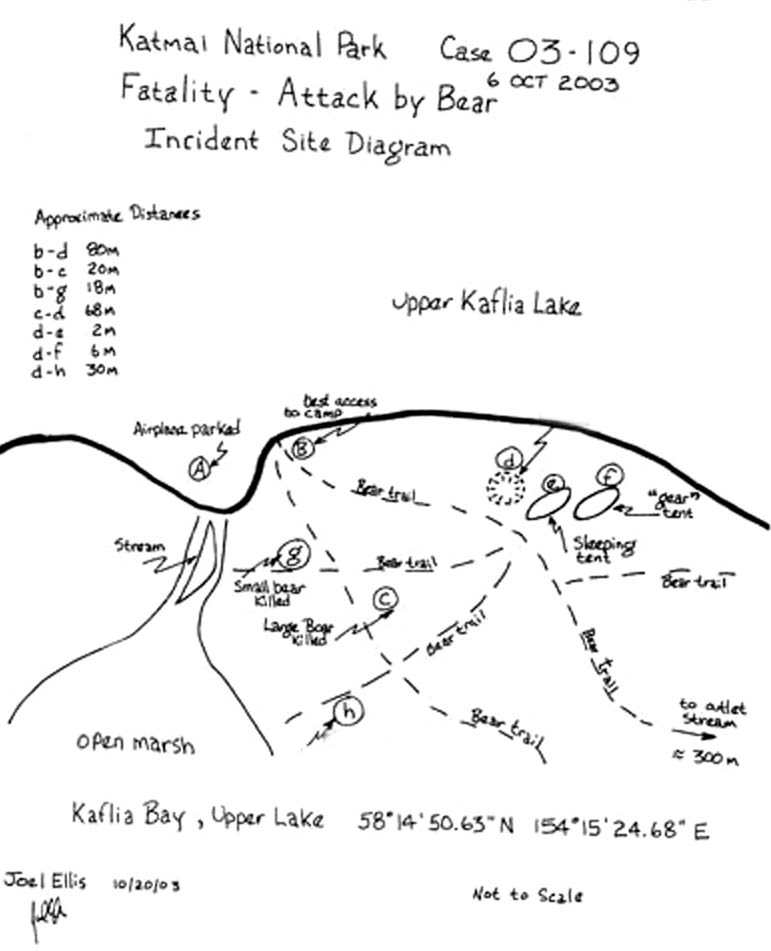
Diagram of attack site: The longitude is incorrectly marked as East rather than West. 58°14′50.63″N 154°15′24.68″W

Around noon on Sunday, October 5, 2003, Treadwell spoke with an associate in Malibu, California, by satellite phone; he mentioned no problems with any bears. The next day, October 6, Willy Fulton, a Kodiak air taxi pilot, arrived at Treadwell's and Huguenard's campsite to pick them up but found the area abandoned, except for a bear, and contacted the local park rangers. The couple's mangled remains were discovered quickly upon investigation. Treadwell's disfigured head, partial spine and right forearm and hand, with his wristwatch still on, were recovered a short distance from the camp. Huguenard's partial remains were found next to the torn and collapsed tents, partially buried in a mound of twigs and soil. A large male bear (tagged Bear 141) protecting the campsite was killed by park rangers during their attempt to retrieve the bodies. A second adolescent bear was also killed a short time later when it charged the park rangers. An on-site necropsy of Bear 141 revealed human body parts, such as fingers and limbs. The younger bear was consumed by other animals before it could be necropsied. In the 85-year history of Katmai National Park, this was the first known incident of a person being killed by a bear.

A video camera recovered at the site proved to have been operating during the attack, but police said that the six-minute tape contained only voices and cries as a brown bear mauled Treadwell to death. The tape begins with Treadwell yelling that he is being attacked. "Come out here; I'm being killed out here," he screams. The fact that the tape contained only sound led troopers to believe the attack might have happened while the camera was stuffed in a duffel bag or during the dark of night. In Grizzly Man, filmmaker Herzog claims that the lens cap of the camera was left on, suggesting that Treadwell and Huguenard were in the process of setting up for another video sequence when the attack happened. The camera had been turned on just before the attack but recorded only six minutes of audio before running out of tape. This, however, was enough time to record the bear's initial attack on Treadwell and his agonized screams, its retreat after Huguenard tells Treadwell to play dead and when she attacked it, and its return to carry Treadwell off into the forest.

Tom Smith, a research ecologist with the Alaska Science Center of the U.S. Geological Survey, declared that Treadwell "...was breaking every park rule that there was, in terms of distance to the bears, harassing wildlife, and interfering with natural processes. Right off the bat, his personal mission was at odds with the park service. He had been warned repeatedly." Referring to Treadwell's death, Smith concluded, "It's a tragic thing, but it's not unpredictable."

== Legacy ==
The organization Treadwell founded, Grizzly People, has argued that Treadwell's presence protected some of the bears in the park -- citing that five bears were poached in the year following his death, while none had been poached while he was present in Katmai. According to court records as reported by the Anchorage Daily News, the alleged poaching had occurred along Funnel Creek, and there is no evidence that Treadwell ever camped in that area.

== Media attention ==
- Grizzly Man (2005), directed by Werner Herzog, is a documentary about Treadwell's work with wildlife in Alaska. Released theatrically by Lions Gate Films, it later was telecast on the Discovery Channel. Treadwell's own footage is featured, along with interviews with people who knew him. Although Herzog praises Treadwell's video footage, he disagrees with his view of nature as harmonious. Treadwell's anthropomorphic treatment of wild animals is apparent in the documentary.
- The Grizzly Man Diaries is an eight-episode miniseries that premiered on August 29, 2008, on Animal Planet and is a spin-off of Grizzly Man. Produced by Creative Differences, the series chronicles the last decade of Treadwell's life with his diary entries, footage, and photographs he took during his expeditions.
- Diary Of The Grizzly Man is a three-episode miniseries that premiered on August 21, 2008. It was produced by Jason Carey, Erik Nelson, and Jewel Palovak. It uses primarily original footage taken by Treadwell, supplemented by his diary entries that are read by a narrator.

== See also ==
- Bear attack
- List of fatal bear attacks in North America
- Backcountry, a film based upon a true story
- Carl McCunn, a wildlife photographer who became stranded in the Alaskan wilderness, and eventually committed suicide when he ran out of supplies
- Christopher McCandless, subject of Jon Krakauer’s book Into the Wild (1996), later adapted as a 2007 film directed by Sean Penn
- Ed Wardle, who documented his solo wilderness adventure in the 2009 television series Alone in the Wild
- Everett Ruess, who disappeared in the Utah wilderness in 1934
- Lars Monsen, Norwegian adventurer and TV personality who once traveled on foot and by canoe and dog sled from the east coast of Canada to the west coast, a project that took over two years to complete
- Lillian Alling, who trekked (largely by foot) across the US and Canada toward the Bering Strait and the Soviet Union, attempting a return to her homeland in Eastern Europe in the late 1920s
- Richard Proenneke, who survived in the Alaskan wilderness for 30 years
