= Patrycja Planik =

Polish visual artist

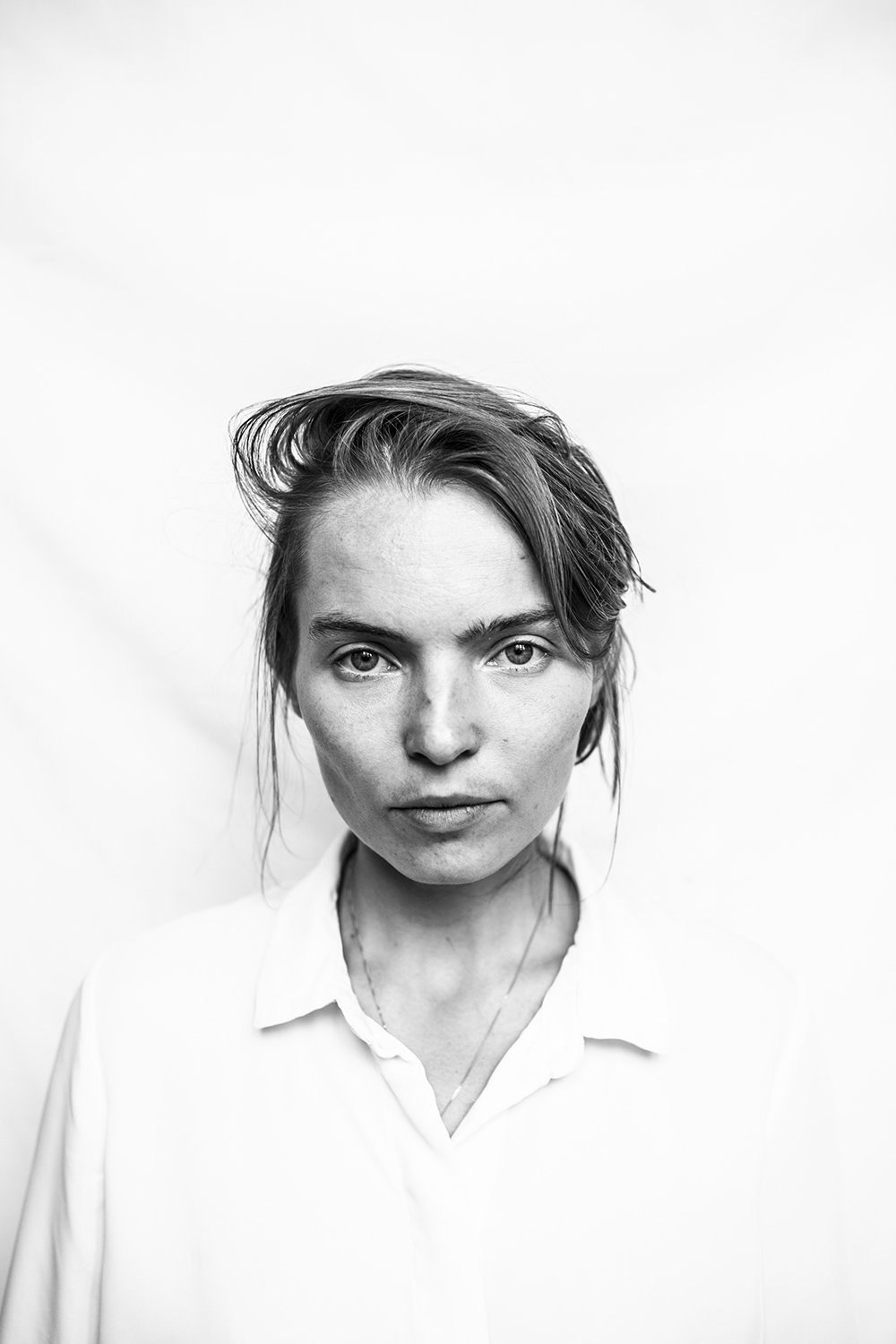
Patrycja Płanik

Patrycja Płanik is a Polish photographer, visual artist and actress.

== Career ==
Patrycja Płanik studied photography at the National Film School in Łódź. She co-created the independent contemporary dance festival The International Maat Festival in Poland. She produced and created Dance.doc, a series of short documentaries about dancers connected to this festival. The project was realized in Poland, Japan, and Israel. Her projects were supported by the Ministry of Culture and National Heritage, Cricoteka, the Center for the Documentation of the Art of Tadeusz Kantor and The International Maat Festival. She cooperated, among others, with the Nowy Teatr Kazimierz Dejmek in Łódź, Teatr Nowy in Poznań and TR Warszawa.

In 2016 she was cast for the title role in Andreas Horvath’s feature film Lillian, produced by Austrian filmmaker Ulrich Seidl. The film is inspired by the true story of Lillian Alling, a Russian woman who attempted to walk from New York back to her home country in the 1920s. As a first-time actress Patrycja Płanik received numerous awards for her portrayal of Lillian.

Variety wrote: "What eerie charge “Lillian” does possess comes largely courtesy of its lead, Polish visual artist Patrycja Planik, who utters not one word in the film's two-hour-plus running time, but does hold the camera with a fixed, blank-slate gaze — making her updated Lillian Alling a kind of stoic proxy for anyone who has felt isolated and voiceless in the great American vastness."

The Hollywood Reporter stated: "modern-day Lillian is played with true grit by newcomer Patrycja Planik, who says not a word during the whole film. It’s a role that would test the mettle of much more experienced actresses, but Planik handles the challenge with a kind of stubborn naivete that is intriguing to watch."

The Upcoming opined: "Even with virtually no dialogue, Planik plays the part with a steely determinism that paints her as an unstoppable force."

Year	Nominee / work	Award	Result
2019	Patrycja Płanik / Lillian (film)	Blue Angel / Art Film Festival, Kosice	Won
2019	Patrycja Płanik / Lillian (film)	Seymour Cassel Award / Oldenburg International Film Festival	Won
2020	Patrycja Płanik / Lillian (film)	Geraldine Page Award / The Method Fest	Won
