= Ed Wardle =

British television producer

Ed Wardle is a British television producer, director, camera operator, and adventurer.

Wardle first gained publicity for adventure activity in 2008. He partook in a guided 'last degree' expedition to the North Pole. Later, he was a member of the 6-person crew led by Tim Jarvis, which in 2013 successfully recreated Ernest Shackleton's 1916 "double expedition" across the Southern Ocean and South Georgia. The expedition used period clothing, gear, and navigational techniques, to sail some 800 nautical miles in the Alexandra Shackleton, a replica of Shackleton's original vessel the James Caird. This voyage - 'Shackleton's Epic' - was made into a documentary, and Shackleton: Death or Glory was broadcast in the UK in September 2013 on Discovery UK and Australia in November 2013 on Special Broadcasting Service Australia; titled Chasing Shackleton for the USA market, it was broadcast in that region in January 2014 on the Public Broadcasting Service.

== Mount Everest ==
Wardle reached the summit of Mount Everest in 2007 whilst filming Everest: Beyond the Limit for the Discovery Channel. He summitted the mountain again in 2009. He summited for the 3rd time in 2017 with wounded veterans organisation The Heroes Project. Then, in 2018, Wardle climbed Mount Everest for the 4th time with Ant Middleton for Extreme Everest on Channel 4. Wardle had also been approached by Ben Fogle who led a party to the summit at the same time.

== Alone in the Wild ==
In 2009, Wardle filmed a documentary, Alone in the Wild, for Channel 4 and the National Geographic Channel. Wardle was dropped off in the Yukon Territory of Northern Canada in order to make a documentary presenting what it would be like to live completely alone in the wilderness, living off the land and the wildlife he could legally catch. His only means of communication with the outside world was via Twitter postings each day. His video diaries detailed his problems finding food and his inability to cope with the solitude. He had intended to stay for three months, but after seven weeks he decided that he needed to cut the project short. His body weight fell by 28 pounds (13 kg) and heart rate fell below 30 beats per minute by the end of his adventure. He was interviewed on ITV's This Morning after his return to Britain.

== See also ==
- Lillian Alling
- Christopher Thomas Knight
- Christopher McCandless, subject of Jon Krakauer’s book Into the Wild (1996), later adapted into a 2007 film by Sean Penn
- Carl McCunn, wildlife photographer who became stranded in the Alaskan wilderness and eventually committed suicide when he ran out of supplies (1981)
- Lars Monsen, Norwegian adventurer and TV personality who once travelled by foot, canoe, and dog sled from the east coast of Canada to the west coast, a project which took over two years to complete
- Nanook of the North (1922), silent film documentary following the lives of an Inuit family
- Richard Proenneke, spent 30 years at Twin Lakes in the Alaskan wilderness
- Everett Ruess
- Timothy Treadwell
