= Andreas Horvath =

Austrian photographer and filmmaker (born 1968)

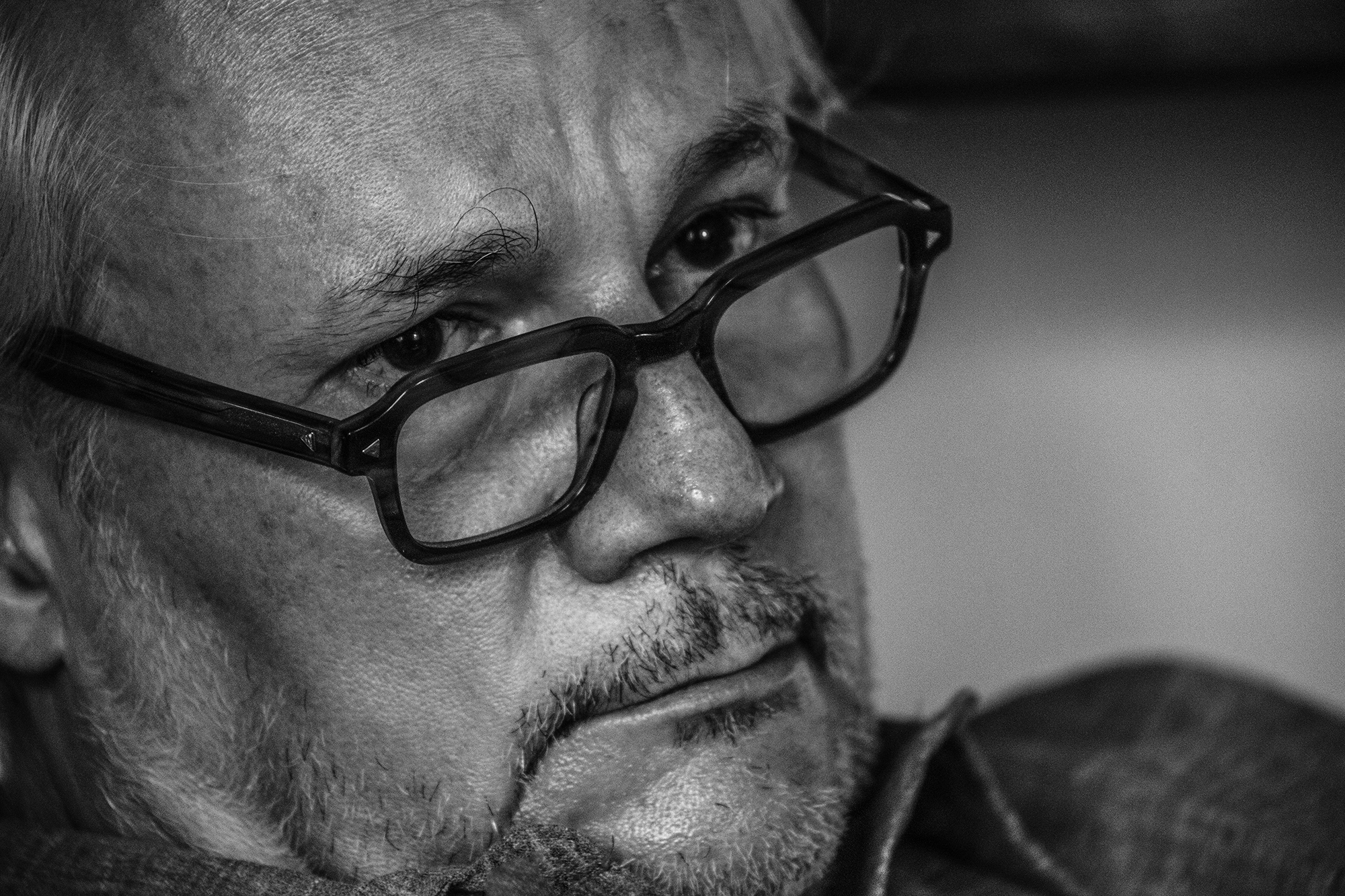
- Born: 25 August 1968 (age 58); Salzburg, Austria
- Occupations: photographer, filmmaker
- Writing career
- Genres: Fine art photography, documentary

Andreas Horvath (born 25 August 1968) is an Austrian photographer and filmmaker.

== Career ==
Andreas Horvath studied photography at the "Graphische Bundes- Lehr- und Versuchsanstalt" in Vienna (1990-1992) and film at the Multimedia Art School in Salzburg (1996-2000). He worked as an assistant of the US photographers Ernestine Ruben and Linda Troeller.

His body of photographic work includes the black and white photo albums Yakutia – Siberia of Siberia (2003) and Heartlands – Sketches of Rural America (2007).

Horvath's filmography includes shorts as well as feature-length documentaries which have won first prizes at festivals like the Chicago International Documentary Festival, the Karlovy Vary International Film Festival or the Max Ophüls Preis Festival. In 2013 Horvath received the Outstanding Artist Award of the Austrian Ministry of Culture.

Horvath's first feature-length documentary This ain't no Heartland (2004) depicts the atmosphere in the American midwest at the beginning of the Iraq War. It won the Grand Prix at the Chicago International Documentary Film Festival in 2004. The film received a limited release in the US. Reviews were mixed. This ain't no Heartland was compared to Fargo and Fahrenheit 9/11. Jonathan Rosenbaum of the Chicago Reader called the film "a disturbing look at how people in the rural midwest respond to the Iraq war". In an overall muted review The New York Times acknowledged that the film "has its grimly funny moments". Film critic David Sterritt of The Christian Science Monitor called the film "the most urgent and alarming wake-up call" and defended it on Fox News.

In 2009, Horvath signed a petition in support of director Roman Polanski, calling for his release after his arrest in Switzerland in relation to his 1977 charge for statutory rape.

Horvath's second feature-length documentary Arab Attraction (2010) was co-directed by Monika Muskala. It tells the story of Barbara Wally, an Austrian feminist and former director of the Salzburg Summer Academy who – shortly before her retirement – converts to Islam and becomes the second wife of a Yemeni driver. Film journalist David D'Arcy drew a comparison to the 1968 comedy film The Odd Couple ("except it's real") and wrote "watch this film, and your jaw may drop – if you can stop laughing".

Horvath's third feature-length documentary Earth's Golden Playground (2013) portrays individual gold miners in Dawson City, Yukon. At its premiere at the Locarno Film Festival it was dubbed "the Moby Dick of the Klondike goldfields". In 2014 it won the Max Ophüls Award for Best Documentary in Saarbrücken, Germany.

In 2015 Horvath released a documentary about the Austrian actor Helmut Berger. The film premiered at the Venice Film Festival. In the December issue of the New York-based magazine Artforum American film director John Waters chose Helmut Berger, Actor (2015) as the Best Motion Picture of the year 2015, heading a list which includes Todd Haynes' Carol, Kenneth Branagh's Cinderella and George Miller's Mad Max: Fury Road among others. According to Waters "the rules of documentary access are permanently fractured here when our featured attraction takes off all his clothes on camera, masturbates, and actually ejaculates".

Horvath’s first fiction film Lillian premiered in the Directors’ Fortnight section at the 2019 Cannes Film Festival, where it was nominated for the Camera d'Or. The film is produced by Ulrich Seidl and is inspired by the true story of the Russian immigrant Lillian Alling who decided to walk from New York back to Russia via the Bering Strait in the 1920s. The virtually silent title role is played by the Polish newcomer Patrycja Planik.

In the years 2007 and 2008 Andreas Horvath also directed four music videos for the British singer and songwriter Sarah Nixey, a former member of the English indie rock group Black Box Recorder.

== Books ==
- Cowboys and Indians (Edition S, Vienna 1993 – ISBN 3-7046-0358-9)
- Yakutia – Siberia of Siberia (Benteli, Bern 2003 – ISBN 3-7165-1295-8)
- Heartlands – Sketches of Rural America (Fotohof, Salzburg 2007 – ISBN 978-3-901756-90-0)

== Filmography ==
- 1995 – Wienzeile (six cinema ads for the literary magazine Wienzeile)
- 1998 – Clearance (short – 17 min.)
- 1999 – Adam and Eve (AIDS public awareness cinema spot – 1 min.)
- 1999 – Poroerotus (documentary – 45 min.)
- 2002 – The Silence of Green (documentary – 48 min.)
- 2004 – This ain't no Heartland (documentary – 105 min.)
- 2006 – Views of a Retired Night Porter (documentary – 38 min.)
- 2009 – The Passion According to the Polish Community of Pruchnik (documentary – 30 min.)
- 2010 – Arab Attraction (documentary – 118 min.)
- 2011 – Postcard from Somova, Romania (documentary – 20 min.)
- 2013 – Earth's Golden Playground (documentary – 106 min.)
- 2015 – Helmut Berger, Actor (documentary – 90 min.)
- 2019 – Lillian (fiction film – 128 min.)

== Awards ==
- 2002 – Special Mention for The Silence of Green Visions du Réel Nyon, Switzerland
- 2002 – Special Mention for The Silence of Green Cine Eco, Seia, Portugal
- 2002 – Second Prize for The Silence of Green Black Maria Film and Video Festival
- 2004 – Grand Prix for This ain't no Heartland Chicago International Documentary Festival
- 2004 – Best Documentary for This ain't no Heartland L'Alternativa, Barcelona, Spain
- 2006 – Best Documentary Short for Views of a Retired Night Porter Karlovy Vary International Film Festival
- 1020 – Honorary Prize of the city of Freistadt, Upper Austria
- 2013 – Outstanding Artist Award of the Austrian Ministry of Culture
- 2014 – Max Ophüls Prize for Earth's Golden Playground
