= Lillian Alling =

American woman who attempted to return to Eastern Europe on foot

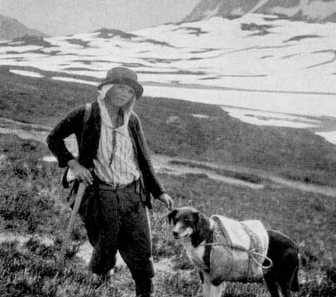
Lillian Alling and dog departing from Cabin 8 of the Yukon Telegraph Trail (photographed by Jim Christie, c. 1928)

Lillian Alling (1896 – after 1929) was an Eastern European immigrant to the United States, who in the 1920s attempted a return by foot to her homeland. Her four-year-long journey started in New York, and went westward across Canada, then north through British Columbia, the Yukon, and then west again, reaching Alaska by 1929. It is not known if Alling successfully crossed the Bering Strait to Russia.

== Journey ==
Because her first appearance in official records was September 10, 1927, when she was arraigned in Hazelton, details before that, including her birth, emigration, and early journey, are impossible to confirm. Alling probably was born in either Russia or Poland some time around 1900. Cassandra Pybus speculates that she was Jewish, based on contemporary searches for similar names, emigrating from Belorussia via Poland in the 1920s.

=== Reasons ===
One of the earliest articles recounting her journey, published in a 1943 issue of The Beaver, simply stated Alling "could not stand the loneliness and the nostalgia any longer ... Siberia was her objective. Once there, among her own people, it would be easy to arrange passage from Vladivostok to her beloved steppes. She could almost hear the deep-toned laughs of the peasants at the market place and the tinkle of the music for the dance."

According to a 1949 article in Coronet, Alling had been sent by her family to the United States in the 1920s to check if they could find a safe refuge there following the Russian Revolution; she began her journey upon hearing that her family had been jailed.

In 1973, retired Royal Canadian Mounted Police officer T.E.E. Greenfield, who had been stationed at Hazelton in 1927, wrote to a local newspaper, the Vancouver Province, with his version of events; according to Greenfield, she had come from North Dakota, pursuing her boyfriend, who was also from Poland and had promised to marry her. Although he had disappeared before the ceremony, she had heard he was in Telegraph Creek.

=== Alling starts out ===
By 1926, Alling had been steadily working in New York, saving up for passage to Russia. Upon finding she still could not afford passage aboard a steamer ship, she instead chose to walk to Siberia. Alling studied books and maps in the New York Library, and had drawn a "rough outline" of her journey.

She first walked to Buffalo, then crossed into Canada at Niagara Falls on Christmas Eve, 1926. When the customs official asked her the routine entry questions, she stated her last place of residence was Rochester, New York, she was a Catholic, she was 30 years old, and had been born in Poland.

Author Francis Dickie's accounts gave an alternative origin: she was 25 and had left New York City in spring 1927 instead, back-calculating from the 30 mi/d (48 km/d) walking pace she averaged from Vancouver to Smithers in 1928. Beaver and Coronet stated she was remembered in Chicago, Minneapolis, and Winnipeg, where she had worked in restaurants, and then farm fields in Canada, where she helped with the harvest.

=== Jail and Telegraph Trail ===
Lillian Alling's journey
Dates are based on references in text; speculative locations shown after 1929

By September 10, 1927, the first official records show that Alling had reached Canada's western edge, 60 mi (97 km) north of Hazelton, British Columbia, having walked an average of 30 miles (48 km) per day. She was stopped by a telegraph lineman at Cabin 2 of the Yukon Telegraph Trail, a 1,000-mile (1,600 km) pathway to Canada's far north; the Telegraph Trail was marked by staffed cabins that served as relay stations and line maintenance, spaced at approximately 30 mi (48 km) intervals. The lineman noticed Alling's tattered and malnourished appearance, and, after hearing her intention to walk to Siberia, he phoned the authorities at Hazelton, at the southern trailhead, out of concern for her welfare.

Constable J. A. Wyman arrived at Cabin 2 (Greenfield says it was Kispiox); knowing the coming winter would be deadly to someone on foot, and fearing that allowing Alling to proceed would be unethical, he brought her back with him to Hazelton. Though she pleaded with him to let her continue, she was arrested and charged with vagrancy. When she was searched, they found two ten-dollar bills and an iron bar (or pipe) 18 in (460 mm) long, which she declared was "protection against men", not wild animals. She spent the next two months in Oakalla Prison, near Vancouver, as an alternative to the $25 fine for vagrancy; this also gave her temporary shelter. After her release, she spent the rest of the winter working in a Vancouver restaurant, and saved up enough money to travel again by the end of May or June 1928.

By July 19, she had reached Smithers, which meant she had averaged 30–40 mi (48–64 km) per day on foot since she left Vancouver. By this time, her story had become known among the British Columbia police force, and she was asked by Sgt. Andy Fairbarn of the British Columbia Provincial Police to report to each of the cabins along the Telegraph Trail as a condition of continuing her odyssey. At each cabin she received assistance, including food, clothing, and even a dog companion named Bruno at Cabin 8 when she arrived there on September 12, according to Dickie's 1972 account. She tarried there a few days, as the linemen convinced her to rest while it was snowing and gave her clothing.

Local newspaper articles indicate that Alling was ahead of Dickie's timeline: on August 31, an article in the Whitehorse Star noted that she had arrived in Whitehorse and was given the nickname "the Mystery Woman" for her taciturn nature. After leaving Whitehorse, she was spotted on September 7 east of Tahkinna; a man offered her a ride, which she declined.

=== Sailing on the Yukon River ===
When she reached Atlin, the dog had died, possibly after ingesting poison from traps meant for wolverines, but Alling was remembered for carrying its stuffed form with her, as she had vowed "he will always remain with me" when he was gifted to her. By October or November 1928, Alling had reached Dawson City, Yukon, where locals had heard of her story and were anticipating her arrival. It was estimated she had walked from Whitehorse to Dawson in just 39 days. She again spent the winter working, and saved up enough money to purchase and repair a boat, which, the next spring (1929), she intended to sail along the Yukon River into Alaska.

The following is excerpted from Calvin Rutstrum's book, The New Way of the Wilderness (1958):

Starting out again, she hiked along the Telegraph Trail, over the wild mountain passes, finally reaching Dawson where she worked as a cook, purchased and repaired an old boat, and in the spring of 1929, launched it into the waters of the Yukon River right behind the outgoing ice reaching a point east of the Seward Peninsula. She abandoned the boat for overland travel, reaching Nome and later Bering Strait.

— The New Way of the Wilderness, p. 1

According to Greenfield, Alling's journey had ended instead at Telegraph Creek in October 1928; she wrote a letter to Greenfield later that year, telling him that she never found her peripatetic boyfriend, but instead had met and married a local man; in the letter, she thanked him for delaying her arrival by a year. Pybus believes that Alling's documented inexplicably long, eight-month stay in Dawson City is better explained by Greenfield's secondhand account, speculating that she had met and become involved with a trapper in Dawson City during the winter of 1928, following him into the wild when the ice began to break up the following spring.

=== Into history ===
The Beaver reported that Alling sailed safely through Tanana to Nome, where she left the boat and began walking again. Bill and Ruth Albee, a married couple who followed Alling's route a few years later, said in their travelogue Alaska Challenge (1940) the mail carrier at Nome remembered Alling passing through the city.

The accounts from 1943 and 1949 give her last reported position outside Teller, Alaska, near North America's westernmost point, in 1929, where she reportedly was seen by an Inuk person. "She pulled a contraption like a cart, containing her few possessions. On top of the pile, the Inuk person added, rested a queer thing that looked like the body of a black-and-white dog." The Albees continued this to a sad ending, stating that her tracks ended at the edge of a swollen river and she was presumed drowned; this was echoed by the Inuk person's account. At minimum, she had walked 5,000 miles (8,000 km).

An excerpt from Susan Smith-Josephy's book Lillian Alling: The Journey Home (2011) gives an alternative possibility for Lillian's fate:

In spite of strained relations between the US and the Soviet Union in 1929, the Native people of both countries still traveled regularly across the strait each year from June through November—when the water was usually ice-free—in order to trade and buy supplies. This traffic was either ignored or undetected by authorities on either side of the strait.

Travel between the two countries was common, and it would have been quite normal for someone to pay for a passage across the Strait. What happened to her once she reached Soviet Russia remained unknown until a cryptic report said she had been spotted after crossing the Bering Strait.

In 1972, author Francis Dickie published an account of Alling's journey in True West Magazine. In 1975, Dickie republished the story with a new postscript in which he noted that after his True West article, a reader named Arthur Elmore wrote to him, recounting a "peculiar" story Elmore had heard from a Russian friend in 1965. In fall 1930, Elmore's friend was on the waterfront of Provideniya, 150 miles (240 km) west of Nome. On the beach were several officials interrogating a group—three Inuit men from the Diomede Islands and one Caucasian woman, all standing near a boat. It is not certain if this woman was, in fact, Lillian Alling.

== Reporting ==
Contemporary coverage of Alling's journey included 1928 articles in the Whitehorse Star, as "the mystery woman" who arrived in Hazelton from the regularly scheduled steamship service from Vancouver to Prince Rupert, without suggesting that she had started from New York, and the Dawson News in October 1928, where she had arrived after "the most trying and uncomfortable hours of her long trip" aboard a small boat, followed by a brief item mentioning her departure by the same boat in June 1929.

One early account of her "complete" journey is from the September 1943 issue of The Beaver, a magazine published by the Hudson's Bay Company. This article included many speculative details before and after the timeline established by official records (September 1927 in Hazelton to spring 1929 in Dawson); these details include her origin (New York), early route (via Chicago, Minneapolis, and Winnipeg), river journey (down the Yukon from Dawson through Tanana to Nome), last sighting (Teller), and ultimate destination (Siberia) A colourful retelling of Alling's journey was given by J. Wellsford Mills in a 1948 issue of Shoulder Strap, the journal of the British Columbia Provincial Police; Mills's article repeated the same speculative details, but Cassandra Pybus believes that Mills fabricated most of this history. These speculative retellings were taken up by Coronet in 1949, then appear to have lain dormant until Francis Dickie published his version in 1966, expanded and republished in the March/April 1972 issue of True West. The Toronto Star also published an account in 1985.

== In media ==
Alling's story has inspired contemporary books, a play, films, and an opera:

- La Piste du télégraphe (1994; "The Telegraph Route"), a film directed by Liliane de Kermadec
- Raven Road (2001; republished in 2002 as The Woman Who Walked to Russia), a nonfiction travelogue by Cassandra Pybus
- All the Way to Russia With Love (2002), a play by Susan Flemming with Kathi Langston
- Away (2007), a novel by Amy Bloom
- Lillian Alling (2010), an opera commissioned by the Vancouver Opera in 2007; it was composed by John Estacio, with a libretto by John Murrell, and premiered on 16 October 2010.
- Lillian (2019), a film directed by Andreas Horvath

== See also ==
- Christopher Thomas Knight
- Christopher McCandless was the subject of Jon Krakauer's book Into the Wild (1996), later adapted into a 2007 film by Sean Penn.
- Carl McCunn, a wildlife photographer who became stranded in the Alaskan wilderness, eventually committed suicide when he ran out of supplies (1981).
- Lars Monsen, a Norwegian adventurer and TV personality, once travelled by foot, canoe, and dog sled from the east coast of Canada to the west coast, which took over two years to complete.
- Nanook of the North (1922) is silent-film documentary following the lives of an Inuit family.
- Richard Proenneke spent 30 years at Twin Lakes in the Alaskan wilderness.
- Everett Ruess
- Timothy Treadwell
- Ed Wardle
