= Lillian (film) =

2019 film

- Film poster
- Directed by: Andreas Horvath
- Written by: Andreas Horvath
- Produced by: Ulrich Seidl
- Starring: Patrycja Planik
- Cinematography: Andreas Horvath
- Edited by: Michael Palm; Andreas Horvath
- Music by: Andreas Horvath
- Release date: 20 May 2019 (Cannes)
- Running time: 130 minutes
- Country: Austria
- Language: English

Lillian is a 2019 Austrian drama film directed by Andreas Horvath. It was screened in the Directors' Fortnight section at the 2019 Cannes Film Festival and was nominated for the Camera d'Or.

== Cast ==
- Patrycja Planik as Lillian
- Ivan Shvedoff as Film Producer
- Marissa Fabri as Store Owner
- Sheila Bonifanti as Customer
- Chris Shaw as Redneck
- Albert Lee as Boyd County Sheriff
- Dave Swallow as himself

== Plot ==
During a job interview a Russian producer of pornographic films tells Lillian he cannot hire her because she overstayed her visa, besides she does not speak English. He suggests Russia is the new Land of Opportunities and advises her to go back to her home country.

In the next scene Lillian discards her passport. She aimlessly wanders around New York City at first, reaching ever bigger highways that eventually lead her out of the metropolis.

After Lillian finds a map of North America in an empty weekend home, her endeavor gradually takes shape. She seems determined to walk across the North American continent and to reach Russia via the Bering Strait.

In what follows, the audience witnesses the changing seasons and Lillian's journey through Pennsylvania, Ohio, Indiana, Illinois, Iowa, Nebraska, South Dakota, North Dakota, Montana, Alberta, British Columbia, The Yukon and Alaska. The film's final destination is the Bering Strait, the place where North America and Russia almost meet.

== Background ==
The film is inspired by the true story of Lillian Alling, an Eastern European immigrant to the United States who, in the 1920s, attempted a return by foot to her homeland. Starting in New York, she walked across the United States and Canada trying to cross the Bering Strait. Alling disappeared and to this day it is unknown if she ever reached Russia.

Horvath's fictionalized version of this story is set in present-day America and, according to the director, was shot without a script over the course of roughly nine months with a minimal team traveling from New York City to Anchorage, Alaska. Principal photography in North America took place in 2016, while the final chapter of the film was shot in 2015 on the Russian side of the Bering Strait, on the Chukchi Peninsula, in Eastern Siberia. Apparently most scenes were developed from chance encounters en route, with locals playing themselves, including a Nebraskan sheriff who frisks Lillian.

The film blends documentary and fiction elements. One episode interweaves the Native American uprising against the Dakota Access Pipeline at the Standing Rock Indian Reservation with the storyline.

The title role is played by Patrycja Planik, a Polish visual artist who had no previous acting experience.

== Reception ==
On the occasion of the world premiere at the Cannes Film Festival Kaleem Aftab wrote in Cineuropa: "The Cannes Directors' Fortnight has unearthed an absolute gem this year. Andreas Horvath's Lillian is a road movie across America, which serves up a history lesson on Native Americans, a state-of-the-nation assessment on rural living and an otherworldly thriller with an environmental undertone." He continues: "It's a fascinating journey with a myriad of characters that continues in the great vein of European filmmakers, from Bruno Dumont to Wim Wenders, who use the road movie as a template to explore America, and especially the rural areas away from the metropolises. Where Michelangelo Antonioni was fascinated with the Black Panthers in Zabriskie Point, Horvath shows the racial divide with the treatment of Native Americans and the genocide that the modern-day United States is built upon."

In The Hollywood Reporter Deborah Young called Lillian "a fascinating walk through a mysterious land", adding that Andreas Horvath "combines his knowledge of the American Midwest and the Yukon in an enigmatic road movie — never was a term more descriptive — that is at once a portrait of female spirit and determination and a reflection on the loneliness at the heart of America today."

In his mixed review for Variety Guy Lodge stressed Patrycja Planik's part, acknowledging that "what eerie charge 'Lillian' does possess comes largely courtesy of its lead, Polish visual artist Patrycja Planik, who utters not one word in the film's two-hour-plus running time, but does hold the camera with a fixed, blank-slate gaze — making her updated Lillian Alling a kind of stoic proxy for anyone who has felt isolated and voiceless in the great American vastness."

In Le Figaro French critic Olivier Delcroix noted that the film "convokes Hitchcock, Antonioni, Nicolas Roeg and even Charlie Chaplin's The Gold Rush."

"Coupled with an extraordinary central performance from Patrycja Planik, beautifully intrusive cinematography from Horvath's and a sublime emotive score from the writer-director, undeniably stands Lillian as a profound cinematic venture."

The film holds a 75% approval rating on Rotten Tomatoes.

== Accolades ==
Organization	Category	Recipients and nominees	Result	Citation
Cannes Film Festival, Directors' Fortnight	Camera d'Or	Andreas Horvath	Nominated	
Oldenburg International Film Festival	Best Actress / Seymour Cassel Award	Patrycja Planik	Won	
Zurich Film Festival	Focus Competition	Special Mention	Won	
Haifa International Film Festival	Golden Anchor Award	Best Film	Won	
Listapad	Victor Turov Memorial Award	Best Film	Won	
Listapad	FIPRESCI Jury Award	Best Film	Won	
Gijón International Film Festival	Youth Jury Award	Best Film	Won	
Trieste Film Festival	Cineuropa Prize	Best Film	Won	
Tromsø International Film Festival	FIPRESCI Jury Award	Best Film	Won	
Method Fest Independent Film Festival	Best Actress	Patrycja Planik	Won	
