= Hallo Bay =

Place in Katmai National Park, Alaska, USA

Coordinates: 58°27′27″N 154°01′24″W

Hallo Bay (Sugpiaq: Ayut, Ayu) is a sandy bay located beneath the peaks of the Aleutian Range within Katmai National Park. The bay is famous for its bear viewing, since large numbers of grizzly bears are attracted to feast on the rich sedges along the tidal flats of the bay. Sometimes they are also observed digging up clams in the mud, and fishing for salmon in July. The food in the bay is so abundant that at times as many as five to six large bears can be seen at one time feeding on sedges, salmon or clams. The bears are usually timid around humans but have learned to trust them over the years due to decades of no hunting and the gentle nature of visitors. However, an incident in 2003 cost bear enthusiast Timothy Treadwell his life, not far from Hallo Bay.

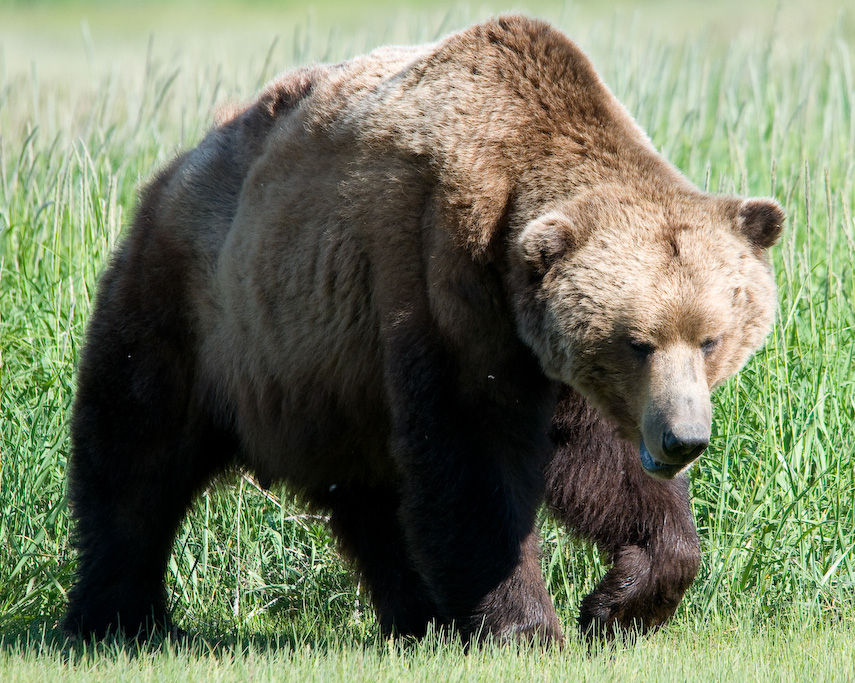
A grizzly bear in Hallo Bay

Visitors to the bay should know that the only places to stay aside from tents are several small cabins and an eating area, called the Hallo Bay Camp. Peak viewing season is July, more information about visitation is available from Katmai National Park & Preserve.
