= Alexander Bichkov =

Russian recluse and arsonist

- Born: 1953; Russian SFSR, Soviet Union
- Died: 14 March 2008 (aged 54–55); Russian Federation

Alexander Bichkov (1953–2008), known as "Russia's Rambo", was a man who lived alone in a Russian forest for nearly 20 years. Bichkov was known for stealing from and "terrorizing" locals, and burning down nearby houses. Upon his death a search of his home revealed a large amount of weaponry and other survival supplies. He was shot to death by police on 14 March 2008, following a manhunt in which two law enforcement agents were injured.

== Biography ==
According to Russian authorities Bichkov came from a family of criminals who had been sent to Kostroma Oblast in the 1940s. Bichkov worked in the forestry industry until his disappearance. Following the dissolution of the Soviet Union, Bichkov left his home and family to avoid having to pay alimony to his ex-wife. In 1997 he was presumed dead, and declared as such by his family. He lived in the forest within Kologrivsky Nature Reserve, building his own camps at a former forestry station, eating animals he could hunt locally. Bichkov left the forest only in the summertime when he could not easily be tracked back to his camp by footprints in the snow.

== Reign of terror ==
Bichkov was feared by local police following an incident where he kidnapped a police officer who was hunting nearby, and held him at gunpoint. After some time Bichkov released the police officer and fled the scene. Bichkov burned down 30 "holiday homes" that were owned by wealthy Moscow residents. Although the police did not investigate, they did name him "Russia's Rambo", based on the title character from the Rambo film series. Bichkov had an "arsenal" of weapons at his camp, and numerous animal traps, and wilderness survival books. Parents in the area made their children walk to school with dogs for protection from Bichkov. At one point Bichkov used animal traps to capture three government officials, threatening their life if they returned to the area.

== Demise ==
On 14 March 2008 Bichkov was shot dead by a group on a manhunt orchestrated by the Department of Natural Reserves. The group was composed of six police "specialists" (not local to the Kologriv area), some of whom were veterans of the Afghan War, and four park rangers. They hunted him down on snowmobiles in an attempt to arrest him. Bichkov, who was armed, wounded two members of the posse when he ambushed them. After setting his house on fire, Bichkov was shot dead by a sniper.

== See also ==
- Christopher Thomas Knight, non-violent American burglar who lived 27 years alone in the wild
