= Carl McCunn =

American photographer

Coordinates: 68.683°N 143.419°W

- McCunn in what is believed to be one of his last photos
- Born: January 25, 1947; Munich, Germany
- Died: c. December 1981 (aged 34); Brooks Range, Alaska, U.S.
- Body discovered: February 2, 1982
- Occupation: Photographer
- Parent: Donovan McCunn

Carl McCunn (January 25, 1947 – c. December 1981) was an American wildlife photographer who became stranded in the Alaskan wilderness and eventually died by suicide after running out of supplies.

== Early life and education ==
McCunn was the son of Donovan McCunn and Erika Hess. He was born in Munich, Germany, where his father was stationed by the United States Army. He was raised in San Antonio, Texas, graduated from high school in 1964, and enlisted in the United States Navy shortly after dropping out of community college. McCunn served in the Navy for four years and was discharged in 1969. He briefly lived in Seattle, Washington, before settling in Anchorage, Alaska, in 1970.

== Alaskan excursion ==
Location of McCunn's final campsite in Alaska

I keep thinking of all the shotgun shells I threw away about two months ago. Had five boxes and when I kept seeing them sitting there I felt rather silly for having brought so many. (Felt like a war monger.) So I threw all away ... but about a dozen ... real bright. ... Who would have known I might need them just to keep from starving?

— Carl McCunn, diary excerpt

McCunn had lived five months on the Brooks Range in 1976. In March 1981, he hired a bush pilot to drop him off at a remote, unnamed lake approximately 225 miles (362 km) northeast of Fairbanks, approximately 40 mi (64 km) west of the Coleen River and 150 mi (240 km) north of Fort Yukon, Alaska, (Note: McCunn's camp also has been reported as being near the confluence of the Coleen and Porcupine Rivers, based in part on McCunn's estimate he was 75 mi (121 km) northeast of Fort Yukon.) on the southern margin of the Brooks Range. McCunn intended to photograph wildlife for about five months. On this trip, he flew in with 500 rolls of film, 1,400 pounds (640 kg) of provisions, two rifles, and a shotgun. Believing he would not need them, he prematurely disposed of five boxes of shotgun shells in the river near his camp. He began his stay entranced by the local wildlife, which was returning to its summer grounds.

Although McCunn believed he had arranged for a friend who was a pilot to return for him in August, he apparently had never confirmed this agreement. McCunn had hired an air taxi service to fly him in and was expecting the friend to pick him up as he did not have enough money to pay for air taxi service out; however, McCunn compounded the error by never telling his friend he had hired the air taxi service to fly him to the remote location. The inbound air taxi pilot later testified, "We had instructions he was to be picked up by a friend of his before winter set in, with a float plane." As the weather grew colder and McCunn's supplies began running low in early August, when the expected plane had not arrived, he wrote in his diary, "I think I should have used more foresight about arranging my departure. I'll soon find out." Apparently McCunn's pilot friend had told McCunn that he might be working in Anchorage at the end of the summer and that McCunn should not count on his help; according to the pilot friend, McCunn had given him money to repair his plane and to fly him into (but not out of) the remote site. McCunn's campsite also was off the regular air traffic route, so he could not count on any planes passing by.

Certainly someone in town should have figured something must be wrong—me not being back by now. But then again there's probably no one in town who gives a —. What in the hell do those people think I gave them maps [of my camp location] for? Decoration?

— Carl McCunn, diary excerpt

By mid-August, it became obvious to McCunn that his pilot friend was not going to retrieve him. At this point he attempted to make his provisions last longer by shooting local game. He shot ducks and muskrats and tried drying the meat of a caribou he observed die in the lake. The weather stayed warm, above 60 °F (16 °C), but it began to rain constantly, with winds blowing from the south. At this point, McCunn's diary indicated his hope that his family or friends would send someone to look for him after he failed to return. He had sent three maps with his campsite marked to some friends and his father, but was not clear about his exact itinerary. Although his father knew he would be in the area, he did not know when McCunn planned on returning. McCunn had also told his father not to be concerned if he did not return at the end of the summer, as he might stay later in the season if things went well. After McCunn was late to return from a prior trip, his concerned father had contacted the police; McCunn had asked his father not to do that again. McCunn's friends testified at the inquest they were not concerned as they believed he had already come out and was working in Paxson.

== Sighting ==
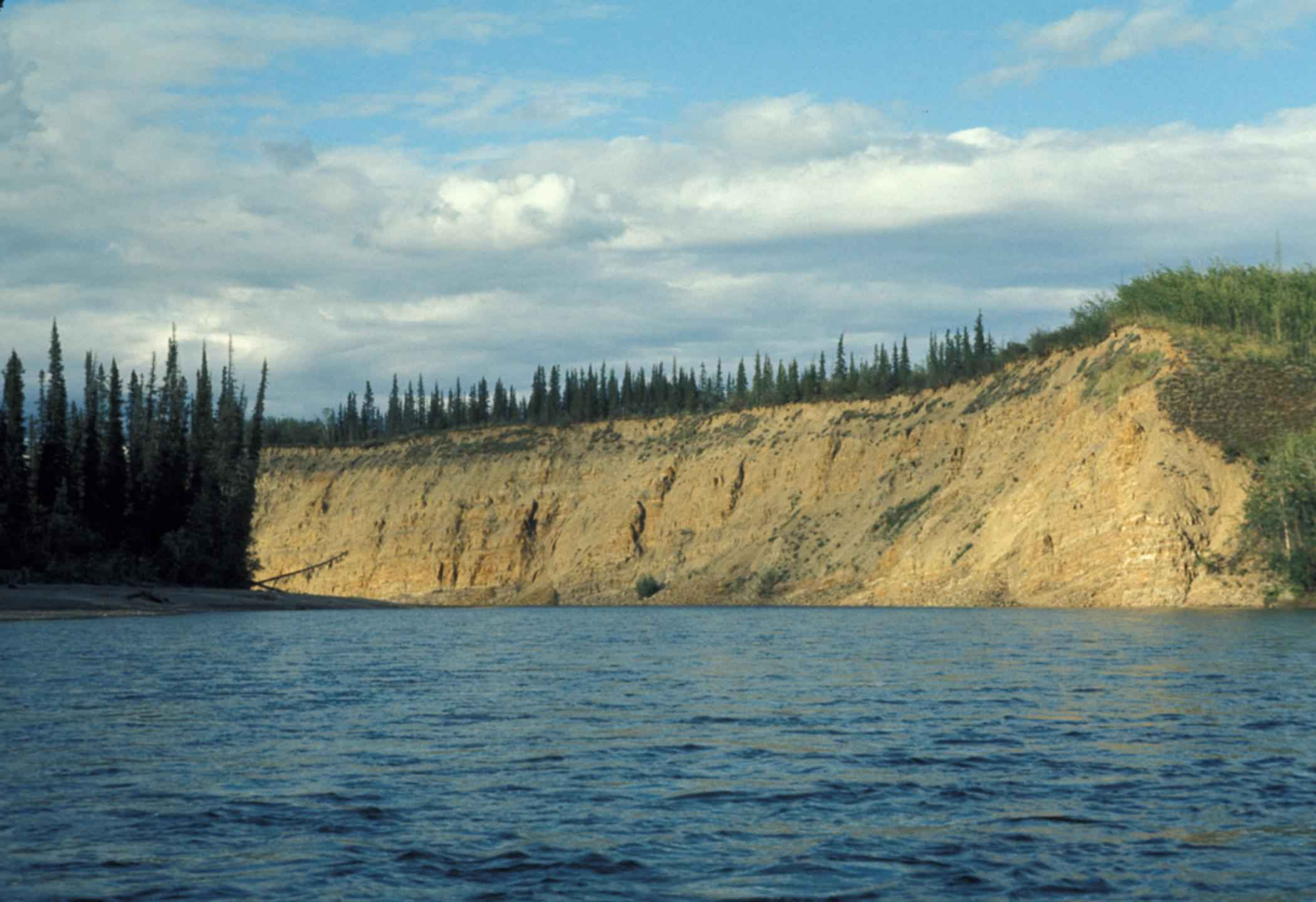
Bluffs on the lower Coleen River, near its confluence with the Porcupine

Unfortunately [the airplane] was on wheels and couldn't land, so I stopped waving after its first pass. I then got busy packing things up and getting ready to break camp. As sunset approached, I began to doubt if the pilot took me serious[ly]. I certainly hope he didn't think that my having stopped waving meant I thought he might have been someone else at first, or something.

— Carl McCunn, diary excerpt

An Alaska State Trooper flew over the lake in late August and observed McCunn's campsite. The pilot did not sense McCunn was in distress, since he waved his orange sleeping bag very casually and, on his third pass of the campsite, he saw McCunn casually walking back to his tent. The State Trooper later testified he saw no reason to surmise McCunn needed any assistance, despite the fact that it is not common to randomly wave a bright orange sleeping bag at a helicopter.

McCunn later wrote in his diary: "I recall raising my right hand, shoulder high and shaking my fist on the plane's second pass. It was a little cheer – like when your team scored a touchdown or something. Turns out that's the signal for 'ALL O.K. – DO NOT WAIT!' It's certainly my fault I'm here now! ... Man, I can't believe it. ... I really feel like a klutz! Now I know why nobody's shown up from that incident." Afterward, McCunn discovered a small cache of supplies, including rabbit snares and a few bits of candles, while digging a shallow trench to prepare for winter. He also had to travel for firewood, as he wanted to leave the land surrounding his camp the way he found it.

I'm frightened my end is near ... If things get too miserable I've always got a bullet around. But think I'm too chicken for that! Besides, that may be the only sin I've never committed.

— Carl McCunn, diary excerpt

A State Trooper who had spoken with McCunn before his trip and helped him mark his campsite on a map stated that he was aware of a hunting cabin located 5 miles (8.0 km) from his campsite. It is unclear why McCunn did not use this cabin when the weather began getting colder. Eventually, snow began falling and the lake froze. Game became increasingly scarce, and McCunn set snares for rabbits, but the traps were frequently raided by wolves and foxes. By November, McCunn had run out of food. He considered trying to walk to Fort Yukon, approximately 75 miles (121 km) away, but was unable to make the trek due to snow and his weakened condition. A prolonged period of cold weather sapped his energy and motivation, and after developing frostbite in his hands, he lost the dexterity required to set his snares. By Thanksgiving (November 26), he wrote of having dizzy spells and almost constant chills.

== Death ==
Am burning the last of my emergency Coleman light and just fed the fire the last of my split wood.
When the ashes cool, I'll be cooling along with them ...
I (chickened) out once already, but I don’t wanna go through the chills again. They say it doesn’t hurt ...
* * *
If my body has been eaten on or if it turns out I take my own life ... just put me under a tree so I can at least make a decent meal for some critter. I don't want my family to see me that way. They'll be hurt enough as it is.
Should I crazily attempt walking out in my condition and am nowhere to be found, please carry out the above [will].
I kindly thank whoever may do so!
The I.D. is me, natch.

— Carl McCunn, final entry & note

Sometime soon after running out of food in late November (his later diary entries were undated), McCunn decided to end his own life. He used all his remaining fuel supplies to create a warm fire. In his diary, he wrote, "Dear God in Heaven, please forgive me my weakness and my sins. Please look over my family." He wrote a letter to his father instructing him how to develop his film. He also requested that all his personal belongings be given to his father by whoever found him. McCunn even suggested that the person who found him take his rifle and shotgun for their trouble. He then pinned his Alaska driver's license to the note and shot himself with his rifle. Just before his suicide he wrote in his diary: "They say it doesn't hurt."

By January 19, McCunn's friends became concerned enough to request the authorities begin a search for him; bad weather kept authorities from flying until January 26, when a state trooper flew over McCunn's campsite, seeing no signs of life with the ambient temperature at −46 °F (−43 °C). On February 2, 1982, a ski-equipped plane carrying several State Troopers landed at the lake to check McCunn's campsite. They found his tent zipped shut and, upon cutting it open, discovered his corpse, emaciated and frozen, along with his 100-page diary. A coroner's inquest was held in July 1982.

McCunn's father, Donovan, gave Fairbanks Daily News-Miner reporter Kris Capps access to the diary and two rolls of film. Excerpts from McCunn's diary were published in December 1982 by The San Antonio Light.

== See also ==
- Christopher McCandless, subject of Jon Krakauer’s book Into the Wild (1996), later adapted as a 2007 film directed by Sean Penn
- Ed Wardle, who documented his solo wilderness adventure in the 2009 television series Alone in the Wild (2009)
- Everett Ruess, who disappeared in the Utah wilderness in 1934
- Lars Monsen, Norwegian adventurer and TV personality who once travelled on foot and by canoe and dog sled from the east coast of Canada to the west coast. The project took more than two years to complete.
- Lillian Alling, who trekked (largely by foot) across the US and Canada toward the Bering Strait and the Soviet Union, attempting a return to her homeland in Eastern Europe in the late 1920s
- Richard Proenneke, who lived in the Alaskan wilderness for 30 years
- Timothy Treadwell, an American bear enthusiast who lived among coastal brown bears in Katmai National Park, Alaska, for 13 summers (1991–2003)
