= Shackleton: Death or Glory =

- Genre: Documentary
- Country of origin: United Kingdom
- Original language: English
- No. of episodes: 3

Production
- Producer: Ed Wardle
- Production company: Raw TV

Original release
- Network: Discovery Channel
- Release: 10 October 2013 – 2013

Shackleton: Death or Glory (also titled Chasing Shackleton) is a three-part documentary series following an attempt by adventurer Tim Jarvis to re-create the journey of Ernest Shackleton during his Imperial Trans-Antarctic Expedition of 1916. This two-part journey consisted of an open boat voyage from Elephant Island to South Georgia, then a hike over the mountains of South Georgia to the whaling station at Stromness, where help could be sought.

The series was filmed by cameraman Ed Wardle, and presented as three 60-minute episodes. The first episode premiered in the UK on 10 October 2013 on the Discovery Channel, and later shown in Australia from 23 November 2013 and in the USA from 8 January 2014 (re-titled as Chasing Shackleton).

The series was described by Ben Lawrence at the Telegraph as a "curiously underplayed affair, with only a hyperbolic voice-over occasionally adding drama". Darrell Hartman at The Daily Beast wrote that it was "well worth watching", in an article also describing the conflicts between Tim Jarvis and the documentary film crew.
