= Nordkalotten 365 =

Nordkalotten 365 was a popular eight episode TV series starring Lars Monsen as he travels across the Cap of the North for 365 days. It was broadcast by Norwegian Broadcasting Corporation with high ratings.

The broadcaster has made high-quality series episodes available for Internet users to download via BitTorrent with no digital restrictions.
