= Illiniza =

Volcanic mountains near the city of Latacunga, Cotopaxi, Ecuador

The Illinizas
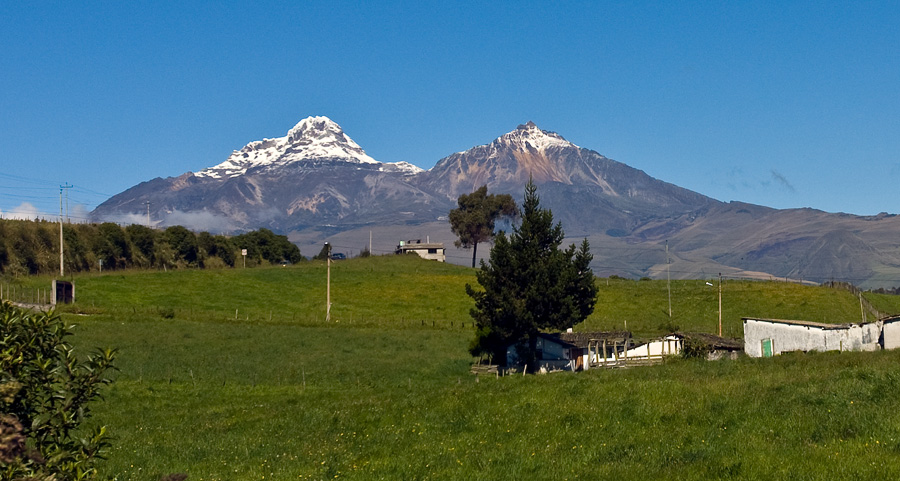
- The double peak of The Illinizas

Highest point
- Elevation: Illiniza Sur: 5,248 m (17,218 ft); Illiniza Norte: 5,126 m (16,818 ft)
- Prominence: 1,750 m (5,740 ft)
- Listing: Ultra; List of volcanoes in Ecuador
- Coordinates: 0°39′34″S 78°42′49″W

Geography
- Location: Latacunga, Cotopaxi, Ecuador
- Parent range: Andes

Geology
- Rock age: Holocene
- Mountain type: Stratovolcano
- Last eruption: Unknown

Climbing
- First ascent: Iliniza Sur: May 1880 by Jean-Antoine Carrel and Louis Carrel; Iliniza Norte: March 1912 by Nicolás Martínez and Alejandro Villavicencio.

Major volcanoes in Ecuador

The Illinizas are a pair of volcanic mountains that are located in the north of Latacunga, Cotopaxi, Ecuador. They are located in the Illinizas Ecological Reserve (Spanish: Reserva Ecológica Los Illinizas). These twin mountains are separated by a saddle that is about a kilometer long. The peaks are among the highest in Ecuador, with Illiniza Sur standing slightly taller than Illiniza Norte, its northern counterpart, at 5248 metres and 5126 metres respectively.

Most guidebooks (for example, Lonely Planet Ecuador, Ecuador: A Climbing Guide) spell the mountain with only one "l" as in Iliniza. The name Illinizas is derived from the Kunza words for "masculine hill."

Whilst Illiniza Sur (the southern peak) is a more difficult climb due to its glacial nature, Illiniza Norte requires some climbing expertise, and may be climbed as a trekking peak. A guide is still recommended, however, as the path becomes hard to navigate as it approaches the summit.

There is a rustic refuge located between the north and south peaks. It can be reached in one hour by car from El Chaupi, followed by a three-hour climb. The refuge has gas stoves, pots and pans and bunk beds. It is necessary to bring warm sleeping bags and food, but water is available to be boiled.

The Englishman Edward Whymper tried and failed twice to make the first ascent of Iliniza Sur. It was climbed for the first time in 1880 by his two Italian guides Jean-Antoine Carrel and Louis Carrel. The first ascent of Iliniza Norte was made in 1912 by the Ecuadorians Nicolás Martínez and Alejandro Villavicencio.

== See also ==
- List of volcanoes in Ecuador
