= Kologrivsky Nature Reserve =

Nature reserve in Kostroma Oblast, Russia

Kologrivski Forest Nature Reserve
- Russian: Кологривский лес заповедник (Also: Kologrivsky Les)
- IUCN category Ia (strict nature reserve)
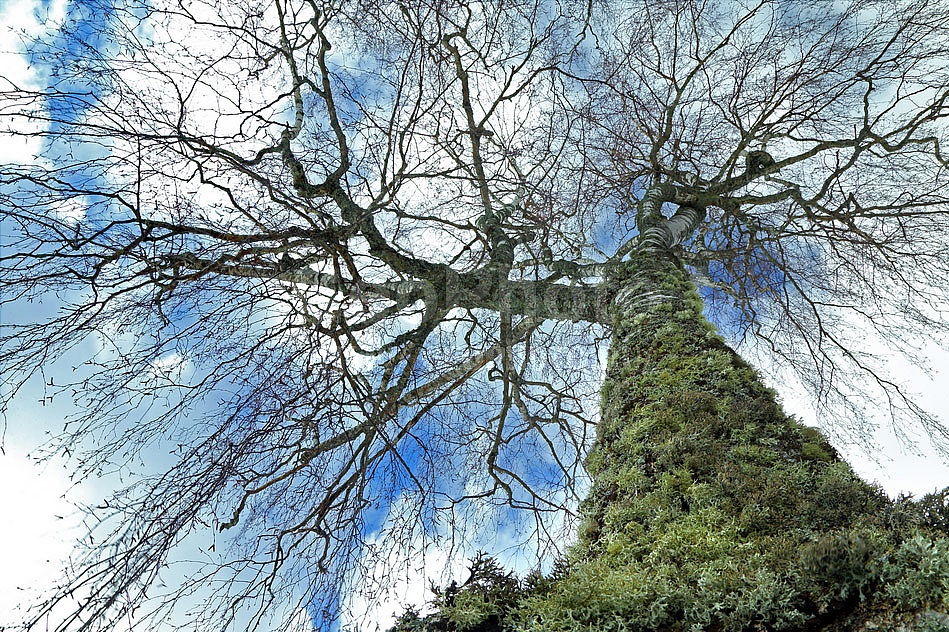
- Kologrivski Forest Zapovednik

- Location within Russia
- Location: Kostroma Oblast
- Nearest city: Kologriv
- Coordinates: 58°56′41″N 43°51′3″E
- Area: 58,940 hectares (145,644 acres; 228 sq mi)
- Established: 2006
- Governing body: Ministry of Natural Resources and Environment (Russia)
- Website: http://kologrivskiy-les.ru/

Kologrivski Forest Nature Reserve (Russian: Кологривский лес заповедник) (also Kologrivsky Les) is a Russian 'zapovednik' (strict nature reserve) created to protect and study southern taiga nature complexes of the Russian Plain. The reserve includes the only two surviving old-growth southern European taiga arrays that are not exposed landscape changes. Some trees are 350–400 years old. The reserve hosts 38 out of 72 species of rare and endangered species in the Kostroma region. The reserve is situated in the Kologrivsky District of Kostroma Oblast. It was formally established in 2006, and is officially named State Nature Reserve "MG Sinitsyn", after its first administrator. The site covers 58,940 ha (227.6 sq mi).

== Topography ==
The Kologrivski Forest Reserve is situated in the northeast of the Russian Plain. It is about halfway between the Baltic Sea and the Urals Mountains, and about 350 km northeast of Moscow. The reserve is divided into two sites, the northern 'Kologrivsky' sector and the southern 'Manturovsky' sector. The terrain was set by Pleistocene glaciation, which covered the area and left a landscape of alluvial outwash, moraines, and lakes. The northern sector has a large plain behind moraine ridges and hills. The southern sector has more hills and evidence of mid-ridge moraines. The relief is gentle, with sharp edges only on stream banks. The shapes of the lake shorelines are heavily influenced by the activities of beavers. The forest cover is middle and southern taiga, in the Unzha River valley. The reserve itself has only small tributaries of the Unzha flowing through it.

== Climate and ecoregion ==
Kologrivski Forest is located in the Sarmatic mixed forests ecoregion. This ecoregion is a belt of forest running from southern Norway, across European Russia to the Ural Mountains. The region lies between boreal forests/taiga in the north and the broadleaf belt in the south The ecoregion is characterized by mixed forests dominated by oak (Quercus robur), Norway spruce (Picea abies), and pine (Pinus sylvestris) in drier areas.

The climate of Kologrivski Forest is Humid continental climate, cool summer (Köppen climate classification (Dfb)). This climate is characterized by large swings in temperature, both diurnally and seasonally, with mild summers and cold, snowy winters. The average temperature in January is −13 °C (9 °F), and 18 °C (64 °F) in July. Kologrivsky is in the zone where precipitation is higher than evaporation. Average annual precipitation is 540 / mm per year. The average period of snow cover is 170 days, ending in the first three weeks of April, with the soil thawed by the first week of May. Typical snow cover is 50–70 cm in the northern sector, 40–60 cm in the southern sector. The average growing season is 160 days.

== Flora and fauna ==
The forest protects communities of 'southern' taiga, exemplified by dark needle conifers: fir, spruce and Siberian pine. Due to intensive commercial logging in the Kologrivsky area in the 20th century, this type of forest has been giving way to successional species of birch, aspen, and alder. (Before 1960, 80% of the area was covered with dark conifers.) Today, most of the reserve is forested, but the actual islands of old-growth southern taiga are relatively small and scattered. The largest virgin stand of southern taiga in the Kologrivsky Reserve is only 918 ha. A key purpose of the reserve, therefore, is to regenerate the surrounding forest from commercial clear-cutting, through the secondary forest types and ultimately preserve a mature forest.

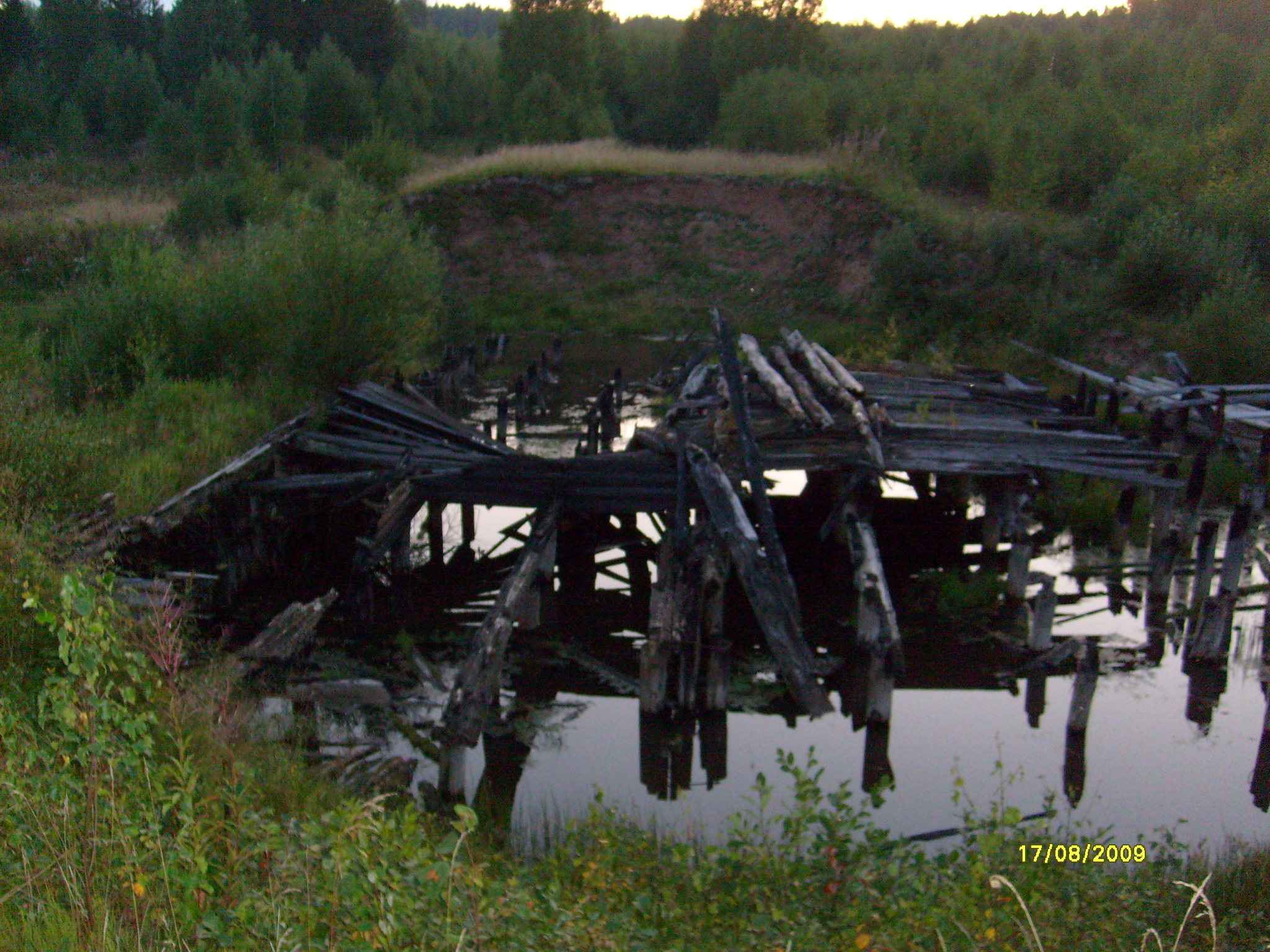
Remains of dam, northern sector of reserve, Parfenyevsky District

The large northern sector (the Kologrivsky site) is predominantly a spruce forest, where virgin stands are inter-mingled with second-growth forests on the sites of windfalls and wildfires. The largest spruces are 45 m (148 ft) in height; the lower stories include Norway maple (Acer platanoides) and Mountain elm. Some logging was done on a selective basis 75–100 years ago, but the under story was left intact; these plots have the highest biodiversity today. The Kologrivsky sector is scientifically useful for studying the dynamics of forest regeneration under various conditions. Scientists on the reserve have recorded 495 species of vascular plants.

The animal life of the reserve is a mixture of boreal forest and mixed deciduous forest. Although the fauna is mostly representative of the Kostroma region, there are recently introduced species. The terrain, with many small slopes and soft soil favors burrowing animals such as shrews, moles, and badgers; and the extensive network of small streams and ponds supports large populations of beaver, mink and otter. The sharp continental climate with cold winters reduces the number of wintering birds and large mammals. The small number of swamps in the reserve limits waterfowl. Extensive fields of ref bilberry do support some birds and bears.

The fauna of the reserve is still little understood: significant scientific studies by staff only began in the 1980s, and the first inventory of ords was not made until the year 2000. The bird inventory recorded 172 species.

== Ecoeducation and access ==
As a strict nature reserve, the Kologrivski Forest Reserve is mostly closed to the general public, although scientists and those with 'environmental education' purposes can make arrangements with park management for visits. There are, however, several ecotourist' routes in the reserve. These require permits to be obtained in advance, and include numerous hiking trails, an 'open air museum', and a multi-day rafting excursion. The main office is in the city of Kologriv.

== See also ==
- List of Russian Nature Reserves (class 1a 'zapovedniks')
- National Parks of Russia
- Alexander Bichkov (1953–2008), lived alone in the forest for nearly 20 years
