= Tim Jarvis =

Environmental scientist, explorer, film-maker and author

Tim Jarvis AM
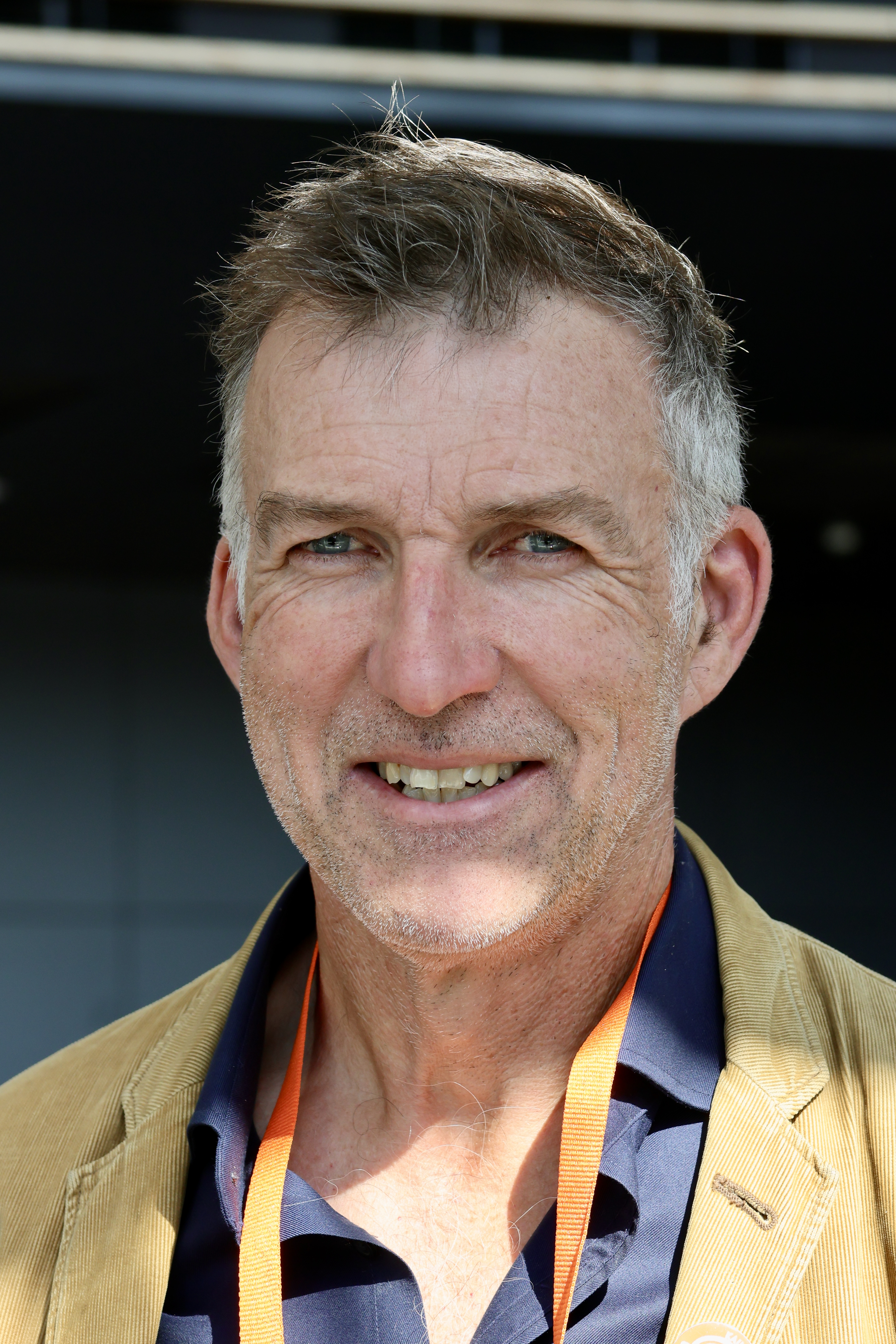
- Jarvis in 2025
- Born: Timothy John Jarvis; 7 May 1966 (age 60); Manchester, England
- Education: University of Brighton (BA); Cranfield University (MSc)
- Occupations: Explorer, author, filmmaker, environmentalist
- Spouse: Elizabeth
- Children: 2
- Tim Jarvis's voice Jarvis speaking about biodiversity Recorded 4 September 2025

Timothy John Jarvis AM (born 7 May 1966) is an English and Australian explorer, climber, author, environmental activist, and documentary filmmaker. He is best known for his numerous Antarctic expeditions, particularly his attempted Antarctic crossing in 1999 and the period recreations of historical treks by Sir Douglas Mawson and Sir Ernest Shackleton.

== Early life and education ==
Timothy John Jarvis was born on 7 May 1966 in Manchester, England. His father being an accountant for the company that distributed Tiger Balm, he grew up in Malaysia in the 1970s, and then attended United World College of South East Asia (UWCSEA) in Singapore. This school incorporated a lot of outdoor activities and "learning by doing".

After first studying for a BA (Hons) degree in geography at the University of Brighton in England in 1988, Jarvis earned an MSc in environmental science at the Cranfield Institute (Cranfield, Bedfordshire) in 1993.

In 1996 he joined an unsupported expedition that crossed a 500-kilometre (310 mi) of ice sheet of Spitsbergen in the Norwegian Arctic. The following year, he emigrated to Australia.

Further studies in Australia earned him a masters in environmental law through the Australian Centre for Climate and Environmental Law at Sydney University and the University of Adelaide in 2002.

In 2023 Jarvis completed the online course "Leading Sustainability: High Impact Leadership", at the Cambridge Institute for Sustainability Leadership, part of the University of Cambridge.

== Expeditions ==
Jarvis is an explorer, adventurer, and mountain climber.

In 1999 he undertook, with fellow Australian explorer Peter Treseder, the fastest unsupported journey to the Geographic South Pole, taking just 47 days. It was also then, at 1,580 km (980 mi), the longest unsupported journey in the Antarctic.

In 2001, he took 29 days to undertake the first-known unsupported crossing of the Great Victoria Desert (straddling the states of South Australia and Western Australia), a journey of 1,100 km (680 mi). In 2002, he undertook an unsupported expedition to the North Pole, covering 400 km (250 mi) across the ice of the Arctic Ocean, and in 2004, an unsupported land journey from Warburton River and Lake Eyre in South Australia.

=== Recreation of Mawson expedition ===
Tim Jarvis in Antarctica in 2007

In April 2007 Jarvis completed an expedition in Antarctica where he attempted to recreate the pressures of the 1913 Australian Antarctic Expedition and human survival feat of Sir Douglas Mawson. Jarvis walked close to 500 km (310 mi) pulling a sleigh full of supplies, and living on almost the same rations as Mawson himself. Jarvis wanted to find out if the story of Mawson was physically possible. At the end of the expedition Jarvis said, "I haven't really done what Mawson did because I have doctors checking my situation, a film crew following me and a number of other safety precautions. Mawson had none of that."

=== Shackleton journey ===
In February 2013 Jarvis and five others successfully recreated Sir Ernest Shackleton's "epic" crossing of the Southern Ocean in the Alexandra Shackleton, a replica of Shackleton's lifeboat the James Caird. Using the same materials, clothing, food and a Thomas Mercer chronometer as in the original voyage, Jarvis and the team sailed their replica James Caird from Elephant Island, in the Southern Ocean, to South Georgia, just as Shackleton did in 1916, with only a chronometer as a navigational tool.

The construction of the replica James Caird ("an open boat not much bigger than a rowboat") was started in June 2008 and was finished in 2010, and was officially launched on 18 March 2012 in Dorset, England.

The sea voyage was followed by a trek across the mountainous interior of South Georgia to the historic whaling station of Stromness. The project, led by Jarvis, was the first successful recreation of the "double" voyage using only period gear.

Members of the Shackleton's Epic crew were Nick Bubb, Barry "Baz" Gray, Paul Larson, Seb Coulthard, and Ed Wardle. The expedition's patron was Alexandra Shackleton, granddaughter of Ernest Shackleton.

== Other activities ==
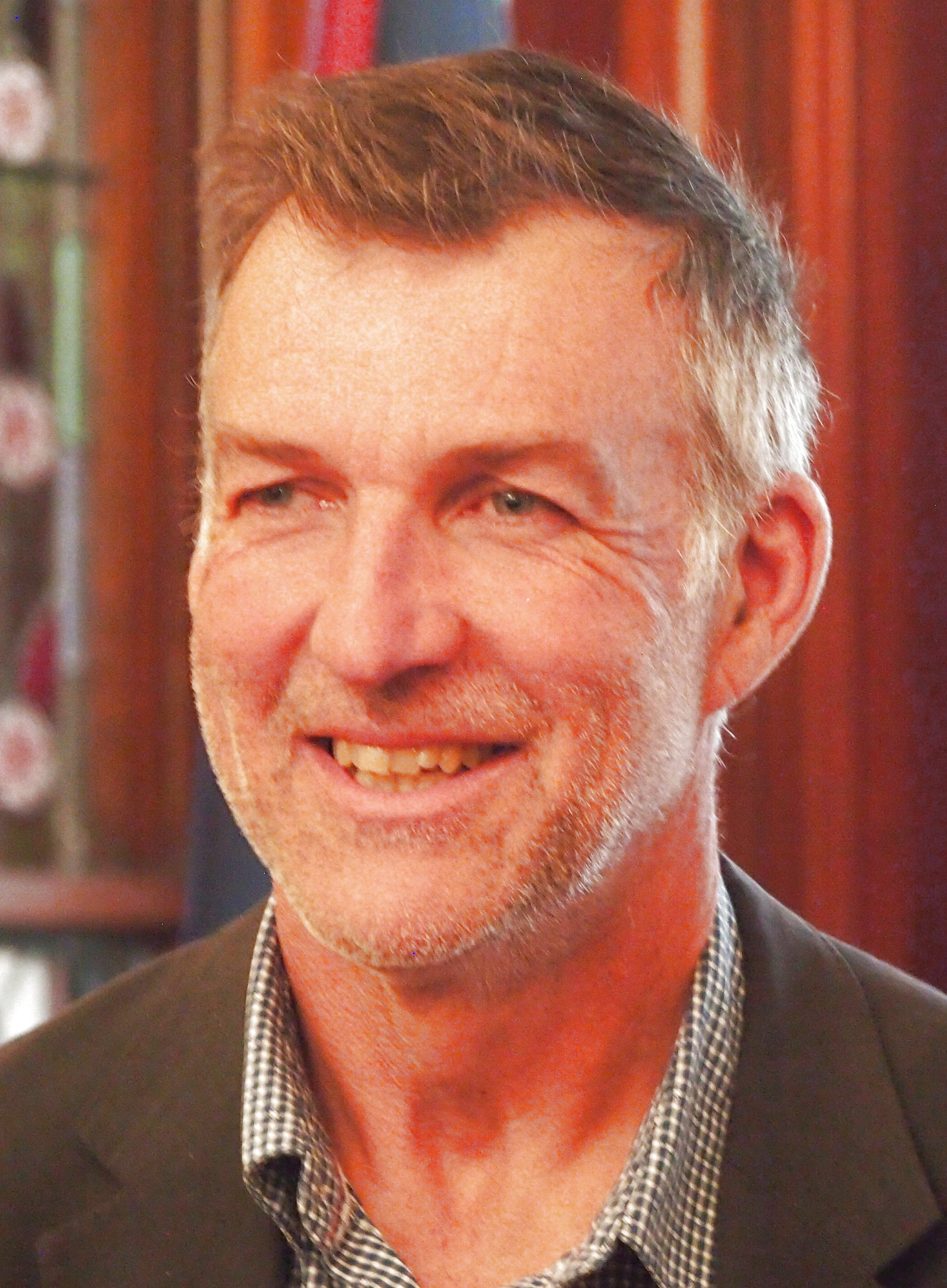
Jarvis at Government House, Adelaide in 2024

Jarvis is also involved in various philanthropic ventures including as a former (until 2019) Board Member of Zoos SA (comprising Adelaide Zoo and Monarto Safari Park), fundraising work with Helping Rhinos (a UK charity aiming to save rhinoceros species from extinction) as an Ambassador of the Australian Rhino Project, and his former role as councillor of the Australian Conservation Foundation. He is also contributing author of the coursebook Frozen Planet produced by Open University, a course linked with the BBC's Frozen Planet series that aired in 2011.

Jarvis is well-known public speaker who presents regularly around the world. He formerly worked as a Senior Associate – Sustainability to engineering firm Arup, and has also advised the World Bank, AusAID, and the Asian Development Bank on multilateral aid projects.

His environmental work is mainly focused on climate change, sustainable aid provision in developing countries, and improving corporate environmental sustainability. Other work includes "significant project" management through his project 25zero, which uses equatorial glacial melt as an indicator of global climate change; the ForkTree Project, which aims to rewild an area of degraded farmland; and advocacy for the establishment of marine protected areas.

Since 2019, Jarvis has lobbied to establish an East Antarctic Marine Protected Area together with Save Our Marine Life (an alliance of leading conservation organisations) and the Pew Charitable Trust. Jarvis authored the forward to the report The East Antarctic Marine Park: Maintaining Australia's Legacy, produced in 2019. He is a board director of the Foundation for National Parks and Wildlife, and ambassador for Koala Life.

He is an advisor to the Pew Foundation on marine conservation issues, and undertook a nationwide tour of Australia in May and June 2023, together with representatives from Pew and the Australian Marine Conservation Society, featuring a short film about the need to protect the ocean surrounding Macquarie Island. The campaign was instrumental in helping secure the 475,000 km^{2} Macquarie Island Marine Sanctuary, declared by Australian Environment Minister Tanya Plibersek in 2023.

Jarvis is involved in developing a Biodiversity Act for South Australia, through his role as Biodiversity Legislation Champion with the South Australian Government.

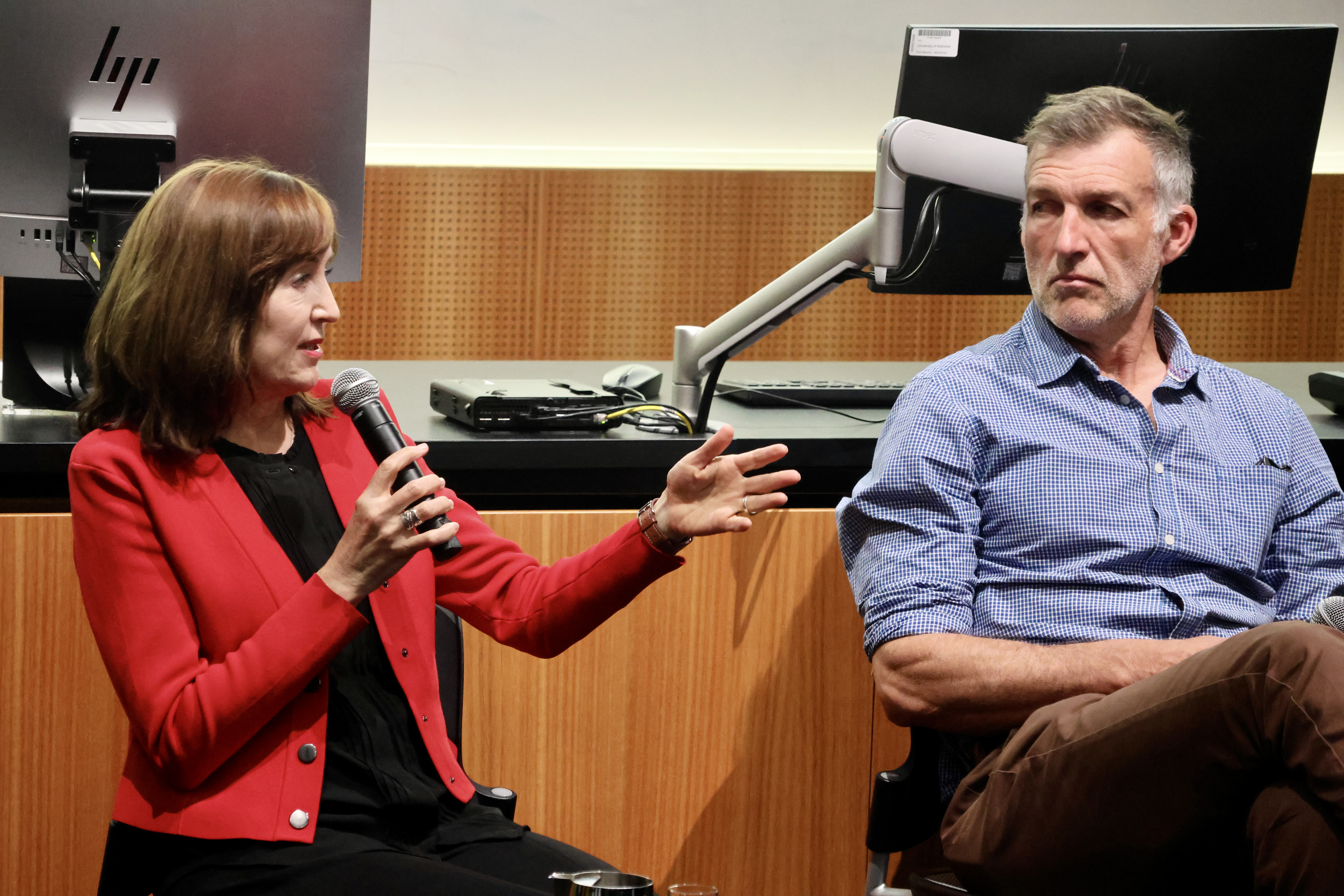
Susan Close and Jarvis at a panel discussion at the University of Adelaide, 2025

Jarvis says he is "committed to finding pragmatic solutions to global environmental sustainability issues", and as a public speaker he talks regularly about motivation, project management and change leadership to both individuals and organisations.

== Published works ==
Jarvis is the author of The Unforgiving Minute (2004), which recounts his expeditions to the North and South Poles as well as the crossing of several Australian deserts, and Mawson – Life and Death in Antarctica, to accompany the 2008 DVD of the same name.

His book Shackleton's Epic: Recreating the World's Greatest Journey of Survival, published by Harper Collins, was released in the UK and Australia in November 2013. It was retitled Chasing Shackleton: Recreating the World's Greatest Journey of Survival for the USA market, where it went on sale in January 2014.

== Projects ==
=== 25zero ===
Jarvis founded the 25zero Project to highlight the retreat of glaciers on the world's 25 glaciated equatorial mountains. He assembled a team of mountaineers and film-makers to join him in advance of the 2015 COP21 meeting, to document the impact of climate change.

At the time of the United Nations Framework Convention on Climate Change, 25 mountains had glaciers, although since that time, four have gone extinct, leaving only 21 mountains with glaciers at the equator. Jarvis has so far climbed 16 of the 25.

In 2016 the 25zero project grew into a documentary film production, with a broader focus on both the glaciers themselves and the communities that live near them. The resulting 15-minute short film, entitled 25zero//East Africa, was released in 2019.

=== Forktree Project ===
The Forktree Project is a not-for-profit demonstration site of 133 acres (53 hectares) in South Australia's Fleurieu Peninsula for large-scale rehabilitation and rewilding of agricultural land. The project aims to be repeatable and scalable and "show a way for private individuals to take direct action in contributing to a healthier planet by acting on climate change and improving biodiversity".

It features a rare-seed orchard and nursery for growing rare native plants and trees for use at the Forktree site and other regeneration projects, and educates school groups via an in-house sustainability and wellbeing program.

== Recognition and awards ==
Jarvis was recognised by the Australian Geographic Society, winning its "Spirit of Adventure" medal for his kayak journey across Lake Eyre, Australia's largest salt lake, in 2004.

Jarvis was made a fellow of the Yale World Fellows Program for 2009. The program aims to "broaden and strengthen the leadership skills of emerging leaders from across the world as they work on progressing thinking on global issues and challenges".

He was appointed a Member of the Order of Australia (AM) in 2010 for "service to conservation and the environment, particularly through advisory roles to developing countries regarding land sustainability and resource management, as an explorer, and to the community".

In 2012, he received SIP Distinguished Fellow Award from the Social Innovation Park in Singapore, an award which recognises global leadership and innovation.

Since his 2013 expedition recreating the voyage and mountain crossing of Sir Ernest Shackleton, Jarvis is considered an authority on Shackleton and the leadership style he espoused.

In 2014 Jarvis was awarded the Royal Institute of Navigation's Certificate of Achievement, in recognition of his leadership of the Shackleton Epic Expedition Team.

He was awarded Adventurer of the Year 2013 by the Australian Geographic Society and was voted Person of the Year 2014 by Classic Boat magazine for his successful re-enactment of Shackleton's 1916 Journey, the so-called "double" comprising both sea and land legs.

He received the Sydney Institute of Marine Science's Emerald award (their highest) in 2013 for services to the environment.

In 2014 Jarvis was a patron of NaturePlaySA (South Australia), an organisation established to increase the time children spend in unstructured play outdoors and in nature to improve their fitness, problem solving ability, emotional resilience and mental wellbeing.

On 20 November 2014, Jarvis was announced as WWF-Australia global ambassador, and was made a Governor of WWF in 2019.

In 2015, global education foundation Round Square inducted Jarvis as the first Idealist for Environmental Understanding. That same year, he was chosen as the Australian Museum's "trailblazer-in-residence" and included as one of Australia's 50 greatest explorers in the 2015 Trailblazers exhibition.

He was the joint recipient of the Jim Bettison and Helen James Award in 2016, administered by the Adelaide Film Festival, along with dancer Meryl Tankard, for his film 25Zero.

For his work on the 25zero project, Jarvis was awarded Conservationist of the Year in 2016 by the Australian Geographic Society.

In 2017, Jarvis was made a Bragg Fellow by the Royal Institution of Australia. The award recognises excellence in scientific achievement and commitment to science communication.

Jarvis was made 2024 Australian of the Year for South Australia on 1 November 2023 in recognition of his environmental work, including leading the ForkTree Project in the state's Fleurieu Peninsula. The award makes Jarvis a finalist nominee for Australian of the Year at the national level.

== Film ==
The feature-length film of Jarvis's 2007 expedition, Mawson – Life and Death in Antarctica, directed by Malcolm McDonald and narrated by Australian actor William McInnes, was produced by Film Australia in association with Orana Films, with assistance from the ABC and Channel 4 in the UK. The film won the Jules Verne Award for Best Director at the 2008 Jules Verne Film Festival in Paris.

Shackleton: Death or Glory was a documentary film of the 2013 epic crossing, and went to air in the UK in September 2013 on Discovery UK and Australia in November 2013 on SBS TV. Titled Chasing Shackleton for the USA market, it went to air in that region in January 2014 on the Public Broadcasting Service.

Thin Ice VR is a 23-minute virtual reality developed in 2022 together with animation studio Monkeystack. It follows Shackleton's 1916 Antarctic survival journey and features powerful animations showing changes in the polar ice coverage between Shackleton’s original journey in 1916 and 2022 caused by climate change. The film was winner best VR film at Cannes and LA film festivals in 2022.

In 2022, Jarvis and Wild Pacific Media produced a documentary film Shackleton: The Greatest Story of Survival "following in the footsteps of Sir Ernest Shackleton and the crew of the Endurance to reveal the true story of their journey to Antarctica". The film's directors were Bobbi Hansel and Caspar Mazzotti. The film, released in 2023, explores leadership lessons attributed to Shackleton, and received positive reviews, including 4 stars (out of 5) from film critic David Stratton in the Weekend Australian, who described it as a "visual treat and a reminder of the great achievements in exploration that took place in the early 20th Century".

Also released in 2023, was the short film MacQuarie Island: Australia's Jewel in the Southern Ocean, which "[explores] the stunning natural beauty and unique marine life of Macquarie Island," a remote part of Tasmania.

== Personal life ==
As of 2017 Jarvis was living in Adelaide with his wife Elizabeth and two sons.
