= Willard Kitchener MacDonald =

Canadian hermit

Willard Kitchener MacDonald (August 13, 1916 – 2004), popularly known as the Hermit of Gully Lake, was a recluse who, after jumping a troop train to avoid service in World War II, lived in a secluded hut by Gully Lake, Nova Scotia in Canada for nearly 60 years. According to his birth certificate, Kitchener was born in Somerville, Massachusetts, on 13 August 1916, to his parents, Findlay Howard MacDonald and Jessie E. Sutherland.

Though Kitchener's situation is obscure, he was most likely conscripted for duty by the Canadian government in late 1944, following an apparent shortage of volunteering military enlistees (though this can not be known for certain, as Kitchener's military records will not be made available until 2023, and he adamantly refused to discuss the subject). Opponents of the idea that Kitchener was drafted assert that the Canadian government would not have had the power to conscript an American citizen (assuming he was not naturalized).

The exact date that Kitchener took up isolation in his home beside Gully Lake is uncertain, whether it be immediately after he jumped the train, or gradually into the 1950s; nor is it known why he chose to stay there. It is likely that he originally began his dwelling to elude capture and punishment for his desertion, but Kitchener stayed there even after the Canadian government declared amnesty to deserters in 1950.

Only a year before his death, Kitchener's makeshift hut, as well as all of the belongings it contained — including books, his various writings, a homemade guitar, and a .303 rifle — were destroyed in a forest fire. With reluctance, Kitchener subsequently moved into a cabin built for him by Colchester County using aggregated pension funds.

In 2003, after some of his friends went to get medical help against his will, Kitchener fled back to the woods, apparently to evade treatment or placement in a retirement home. His remains were found on 27 June 2004 by a search party of over 100 volunteers.

A film of his life and final days, Willard: The Hermit of Gully Lake on YouTube, was produced and directed by Amy Goldberg and premiered in 2007. This feature-length documentary features narration and a musical score by Randy Bachman.
