= Chicago International Documentary Film Festival =

The Chicago International Documentary Film Festival (CIDF) was a Chicago festival devoted to documentary films. It was established in 2003 and presented by the Society for Arts, a nonprofit organization.

== History ==
The third festival was held in 2005. It presented 86 feature films and 15 shorts over ten days at eight locations in Chicago. The fifth festival was held in 2007.

On August 25, 2008, CIDF announced that it had cancelled its 2009 dates because of funding problems in Chicago and postponed the next edition indefinitely, while continuing its docsPace program.
