= Christopher Thomas Knight =

American hermit (born 1965)

- Born: December 7, 1965 (age 60); Maine, U.S.
- Other name: North Pond Hermit
- Occupations: Recluse, hermit, burglar
- Years active: 1986–2013
- Known for: Living in isolation for 27 years

Christopher Thomas Knight (born December 7, 1965), also known as the North Pond Hermit, is an American extreme survival camper and convicted burglar who lived with little to no human contact for 27 years, between 1986 and 2013, in the North Pond area of Maine's Belgrade Lakes.

During his seclusion, Knight lived within one mile (two kilometers) of summer cabins in a crude camp he built in a well-drained woodland obscured within a cluster of glacial erratic boulders. Having entered the woods with almost no possessions, he set up a camp composed entirely of items stolen from nearby cabins and camps. He also pilfered from a local family's dairy farm adjacent to where he camped. He survived by committing around 1,000 burglaries against houses in the area, at a rate of roughly 40 per year, to be able to survive during the harsh winters of Maine.

Apart from the fear and notoriety his many burglaries created in the local area, Knight's unusual life also attracted widespread international media reports upon his capture. Journalist Michael Finkel wrote an in-depth story about the incident for GQ and later wrote a book titled The Stranger in the Woods: The Extraordinary Story of the Last True Hermit.

== Life and seclusion ==
Christopher Thomas Knight was born in Maine in 1965 and graduated from Lawrence High School in Fairfield, Maine. After completing an electronics course at Sylvania Technical School, Knight took a job installing home alarms in Waltham, Massachusetts. In 1986, Knight abandoned his job and took a road trip throughout the South before abruptly driving back up to Maine, stopping only when his car ran out of gas. At only 20 years old, he entered the woods, saying goodbye to no one. His parents never reported him missing to the police. In an interview, Knight said, "I had good parents," and "We're not emotionally bleeding all over each other. We're not touchy-feely. Stoicism is expected." At the time of his notoriety, neighbors who lived near Knight's childhood home reported that for 14 years, they had exchanged no more than a few words with Knight's mother. Over the next three years, Knight changed the location of his camp sporadically out of fear of being caught, settling outside the North Pond lakes in 1989.

Knight survived the bitterly cold Maine winters, with temperatures regularly falling below 0 °F (−18 °C), by waking up during the coldest part of the night and pacing his camp until warm. He regularly took cold sponge baths, shaved, and cut his hair, in part to avoid suspicion in the event he was spotted by others. He avoided building wood fires, whose smoke might reveal the location of his camp, and relied on a propane camp stove to cook and melt snow for drinking and bathing. After stealing propane cylinders, he transported them in canoes borrowed from vacant camps. He quietly paddled along the shadowy shoreline in the predawn hours to avoid being silhouetted on open water. Knight concealed thefts by sprinkling pine needles over the used canoes when he returned them to make them appear undisturbed. He stockpiled supplies to remain in his camp from November to March to avoid revealing his location by footprints on snow-covered ground.

A few residents interviewed by The Boston Globe have expressed doubt at Knight's outdoor survival skills, saying he might have broken into and taken refuge in vacant cabins.

=== Encounters with others during seclusion ===
At the time of his arrest, Knight claimed that only one time during his 27 years of solitude did he speak with another human; at some point in the 1990s, he exchanged the word hi with a hiker whom he encountered on a lightly traveled path.

In the summer of 2012, Knight broke into a cabin where a man was sleeping. There was no car in the driveway, so Knight thought the building was empty. Neither man saw the other, but the man in the cabin shouted, “Get the hell out of here!", after which Knight ran out. Knight reportedly never returned to that particular cabin.

Biographer Michael Finkel later reported that around February 2013, a fisherman named Tony Bellavance (along with his son and grandson) discovered Knight in his camp, two months before he was apprehended by police. Knight later admitted to having been discovered by the fishermen but did not mention it to police at the time of his arrest because the group swore a pact not to tell anyone of their meeting (after the anglers learned that Knight simply wanted to be left alone).

== Capture and aftermath ==
Knight was captured by game warden Sergeant Terry Hughes on April 4, 2013, while burgling the Pine Tree Camp in Rome, Maine. Hughes had been determined to capture Knight and worked with the camp to install hidden motion detectors which would alert him to trespassers. He was sentenced to seven months in jail on October 28, 2013, of which he had already served all but a week while awaiting sentencing. In addition to the jail sentence, Knight paid $2,000 in restitution to victims, completed a Co-Occurring Disorders Court Program (designed for people with substance abuse problems and mental health disorders), and completed three years of probation.

Knight has described deep-felt ethical misgivings about the burglaries committed, saying that stealing is wrong. Even the prosecutor said a longer sentence would have been cruel. Judge Nancy Mills believes that Knight was unlikely to reoffend. After release, Knight met with the judge every week, avoided alcohol, and secured a job with his brother.

Journalist Michael Finkel met with Knight for nine one-hour sessions while he was in jail. This was the genesis for first an article in GQ in August 2014, and then the book The Stranger In The Woods, published in March 2017.

Knight was largely reluctant to express any inkling of motives or insights gained through his experience, but he did offer, "Solitude bestows an increase in something valuable. I can’t dismiss that idea. Solitude increased my perception. But here’s the tricky thing: when I applied my increased perception to myself, I lost my identity. There was no audience, no one to perform for. There was no need to define myself. I became irrelevant", "My desires dropped away. I didn’t long for anything. I didn’t even have a name. To put it romantically, I was completely free". Finkel compared this observation to similar statements by Ralph Waldo Emerson, Charles de Foucauld, and Thomas Merton. Knight however resented being compared to Henry David Thoreau, instead calling him a dilettante because Thoreau lived for only two years in his Walden Pond cabin and his mother did his laundry, saying he was "...just a show-off who went out there and wrote a book saying 'Look how great I am.'" As of 2019, Knight lived a quiet life in rural Maine.

== See also ==
- Alexander Bichkov lived alone in a Russian forest for nearly 20 years and was shot to death by police
- Ted Kaczynski, known as the Unabomber, lived as a hermit for 25 years in Montana
- Christopher McCandless, nomadic hitchhiker who starved to death in the Alaskan wilderness. Subject of Jon Krakauer's book Into the Wild (1996), later adapted into a 2007 film by Sean Penn
- Carl McCunn, wildlife photographer who became stranded in the Alaskan wilderness and eventually killed himself when he ran out of supplies (1981)
- Richard Proenneke, spent 30 years at Twin Lakes in the Alaskan wilderness
- Agafia Lykova, last survivor of the Lykov family who lived in the Russian wilderness starting in 1936, without contact with the outside world for 40 years
- The Man of the Hole, the last member of an uncontacted Indigenous people of Brazil after his people were murdered by illegal miners in 1995, who lived in isolation in the Amazon until his death in 2022
- Willard Kitchener MacDonald, a Canadian deserter who became a hermit in Gully Lake, Nova Scotia for nearly 60 years after jumping off a troop transport train.
- Joseph Henry Burgess, AKA "The Cookie Bandit". In 2009 he was finally shot and killed in the Jemez Mountains of New Mexico after a shootout with sheriff's deputies during one of his many cabin break-ins. He was wanted in Canada for a 1972 double homicide and connected to a slew of crimes across the American West.
