= Iliniza Sur =

Mountain in Ecuador

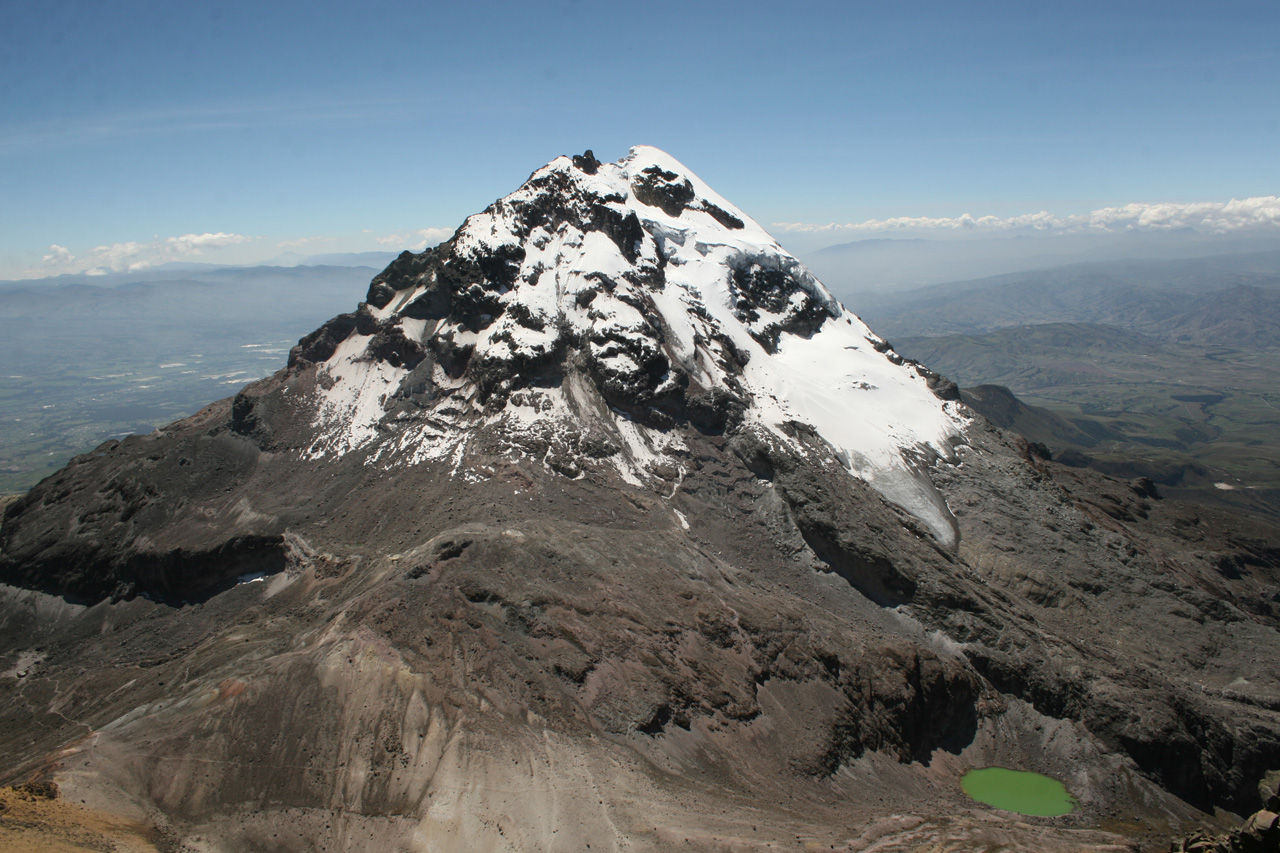
- Iliniza Sur

Highest point
- Elevation: 5,245 m (17,208 ft)
- Coordinates: 0°39′50″S 78°42′53″W

Geography
- Location within Ecuador
- Location: Ecuador
- Parent range: Andes

Iliniza Sur is a mountain in the Andes of Ecuador. It has a height of 5,245 metres (17,208 ft) and is the higher of the two Illinizas.

== See also ==
- List of mountains in the Andes
