= Alone in the Wild =

- Genre: Documentary
- Presented by: Ed Wardle
- Country of origin: United Kingdom

Production
- Running time: 49 minutes

Original release
- Network: Channel 4
- Release: 2009 – 2009

Alone in the Wild is a 2009 documentary television series commissioned by Channel 4 and produced by Tigress Productions, a UK independent producer. It was co-produced with the National Geographic Channel. Ed Wardle, an accomplished extreme photographer, created and filmed the series. Throughout the adventure, during which he never saw another human, Ed tweeted daily outgoing-only messages about his experiences. The goal was to survive solo for three summer months.

The series was produced by Dick Colthurst of Tigress Productions, Bristol. It was commissioned by Tanya Shaw of Channel 4, London. The multiplatform aspect of the project (including the use of Twitter) was commissioned by Adam Gee at Channel 4.

== Episodes ==
In Episode 1, he was dropped off by an amphibious aircraft, along with essential supplies and rations, at Dog Pack Lake in the Yukon Territory of Canada. He found a few fish, greens, and some berries, and managed to kill, butcher, and eat a porcupine, but quickly lost weight, and his heartrate dropped to as low as 28 bpm.

Episode 2 focused on his trek to a potentially more food-laden site at Tincup Lake which, although only about ten miles away, took nearly four days to reach, because he traversed that large body of water, negotiating steep and brushy terrain, in order to locate his camp near the stream emptying from the far shore, where salmon would hopefully be found. He often commented about the serene natural beauty of the lacustrine and montane scenery. For psychological enhancement, he also tried meditation, but it appeared to provide little or no benefit.

During Episode 3, he attempted to find sustenance at Tincup, following the outflowing stream downhill in search of salmon. During the expedition, he saw several moose, a caribou, and ducks, but Canadian law did not permit him to kill any of them. Tincup proved to be even worse than Dog Pack. Although he continued to check nearly a score of rabbit snares, only one or two rabbits were ever collared. He shot another porcupine, but worried that a bear might smell the flesh and attack him. He was frequently overtaken by trepidation toward bears. Although he managed to capture a few trout and graylings at Tincup, and found some blueberries, he never spotted one salmon. The most serious issue, however, may have been his loneliness, which caused him to cry at some point in all three episodes. The combination of social isolation and undernourishment, as he ran out of rations at approximately day 50 of the outing, finally forced him to call for a rescue plane to take him to Whitehorse, where he reflected on the trip in the comparative luxury of a hotel room.

== See also ==
- Alone (TV series)
- Backpacking
- Bushcraft
- Ecopsychology
- Expeditionary education
- Survivorman
- Wilderness survival
