= Lars Monsen =

Norwegian adventurer and journalist (born 1963)

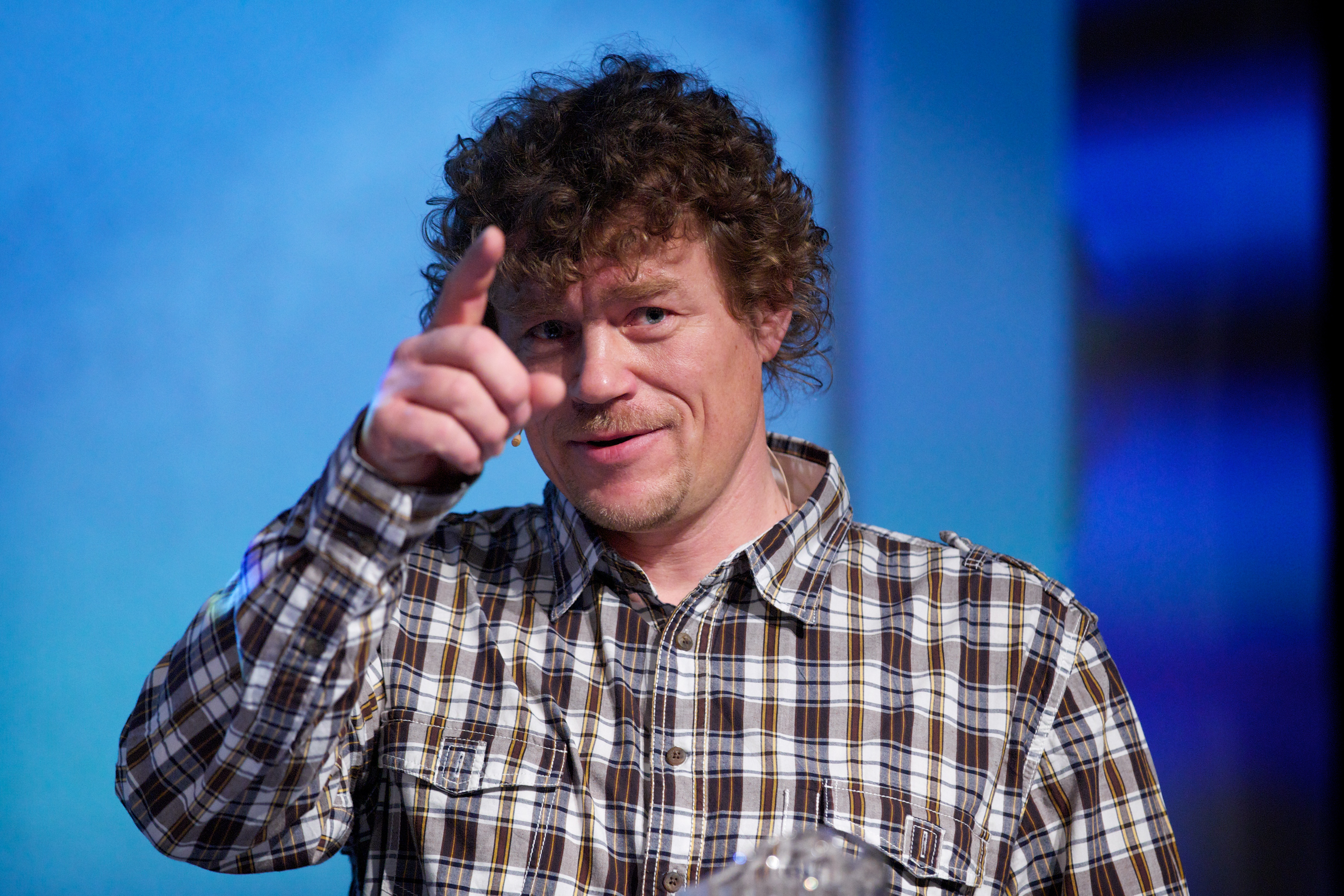
- Monsen in 2010
- Born: Lars Thorbjørn Monsen; 21 April 1963 (age 62); Oslo, Norway
- Occupations: Adventurer, writer, journalist, musher, teacher
- Spouse: Trine Rein (m. 2015)
- Awards: The Norwegian Outdoor Life Award (2008), Gullruten Audience Award (2010), Jonas Prize (2012), Marte Prize (2018)
- Website: larsmonsen.com

Lars Thorbjørn Monsen (born 21 April 1963) is a Norwegian adventurer and journalist. He has done a number of exploration and backpacking expeditions in harsh wilderness.

He became well-known after documenting a thru-hiking trip made over the course of nearly three years in northern Canada, which was then broadcast on NRK in 2005. In 2010 and again in 2012, Monsen was the expedition leader for the Norwegian television program Ingen Grenser, a remake of BBC's Beyond Boundaries. In the first season, the group traversed 500 kilometers of the Cap of the North in 30 days, some of the participants with severe physical limitations.

Monsen is of partly Sami descent. He is married to American-Norwegian artist Trine Rein.

== Television ==
Year	Title	Network	Notes
2005	Canada på tvers	NRK	
2005	På tur med Lars Monsen	NRK	
2007	Nordkalotten 365: Et år på tur med Lars Monsen	NRK	
2010–2012	Ingen grenser	NRK	2 seasons
2012–2018	Monsen og hundene	NRK	5 seasons
2018	Monsen minutt for minutt	NRK	Slow television program
2020	Hjemmecamp Monsen	NRK	
2017–2021	På tur med Monsen, Monsen og Mattis	NRK	2 seasons
2014–2022	Med Monsen på villspor	NRK	4 seasons
2025-2026	Monsen og nasjonalparkene	NRK	2 seasons
