= Ester, Alaska =

- Census-designated place
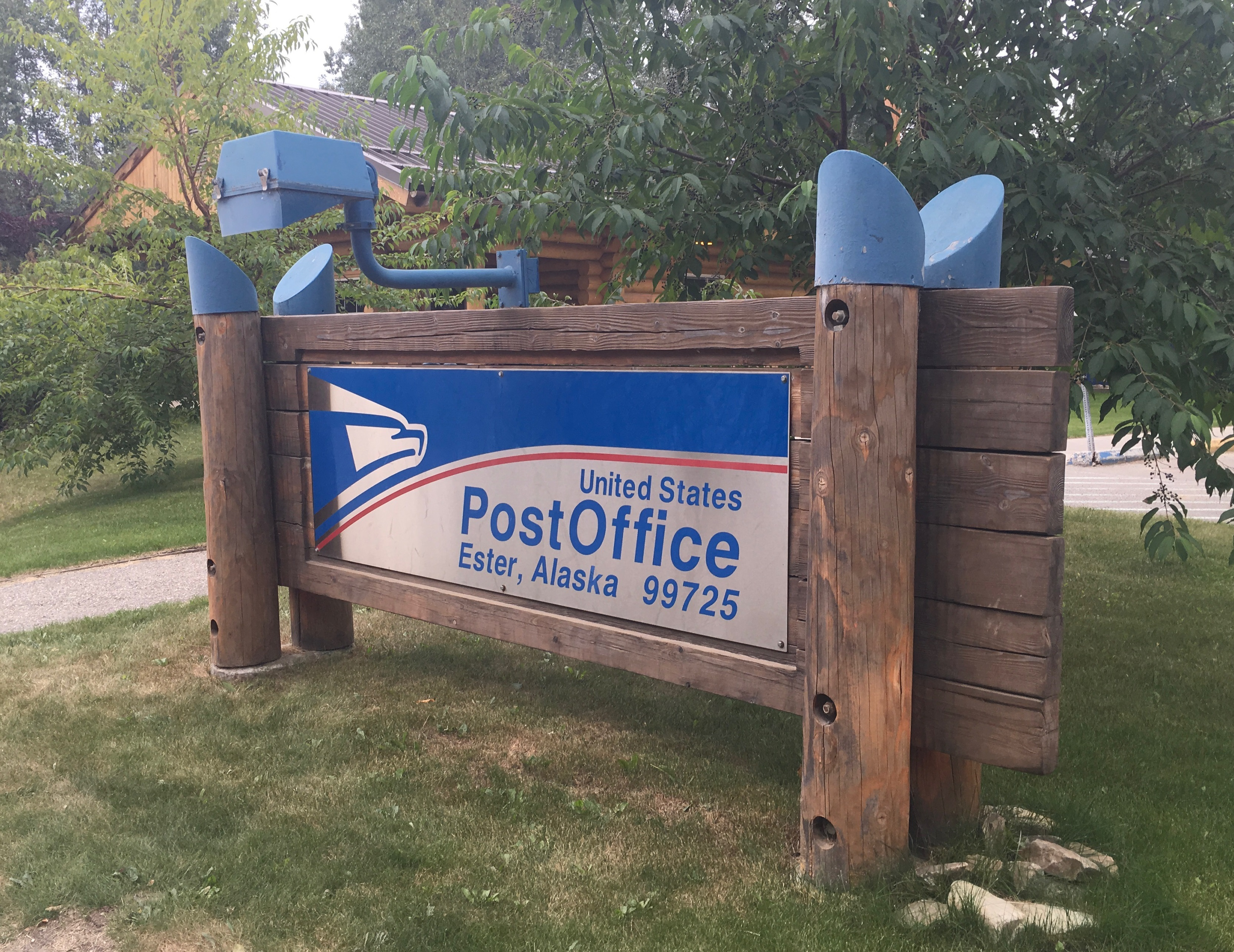
- The United States Post Office in Ester, Alaska

- Location within Fairbanks North Star Borough and the state of Alaska
- Coordinates: 64°51′21″N 147°58′42″W
- Country: United States
- State: Alaska
- Borough: Fairbanks North Star

Government
  - Borough mayor: Bryce J. Ward
  - State senator: Click Bishop (R)
  - State rep.: Ashley Carrick (D)

Area
  - Total: 64.31 sq mi (166.55 km^{2})
  - Land: 64.24 sq mi (166.37 km^{2})
  - Water: 0.066 sq mi (0.17 km^{2})
- Elevation: 720 ft (220 m)

Population (2020)
  - Total: 2,416
  - Density: 37.6/sq mi (14.52/km^{2})
- Time zone: UTC-9 (Alaska (AKST))
  - Summer (DST): UTC-8 (AKDT)
- ZIP code: 99725
- Area code: 907
- FIPS code: 02-23460
- GNIS feature ID: 1397658

- Ester Camp Historic District
- U.S. National Register of Historic Places
- U.S. Historic district
- Alaska Heritage Resources Survey
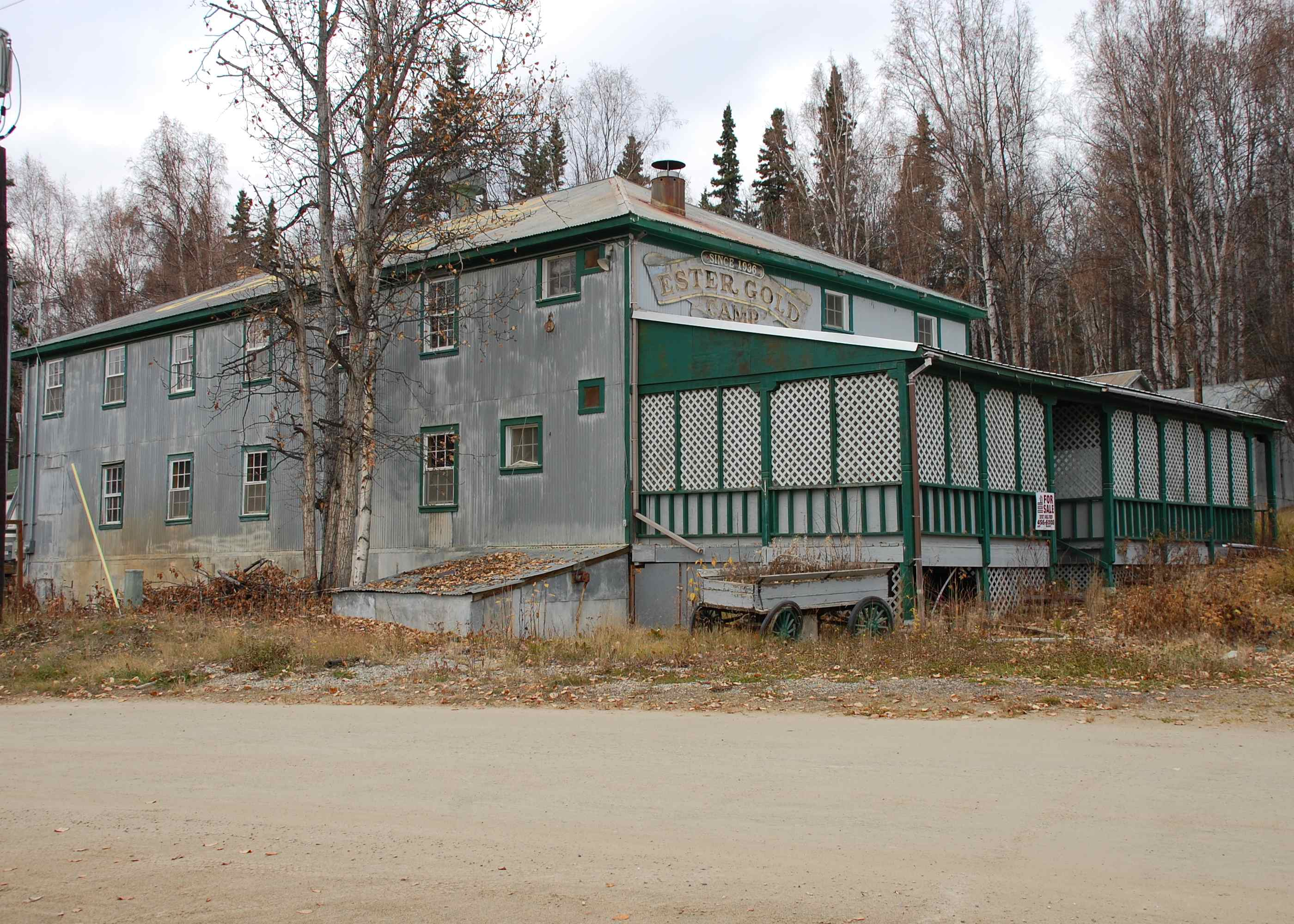

- Location within Alaska

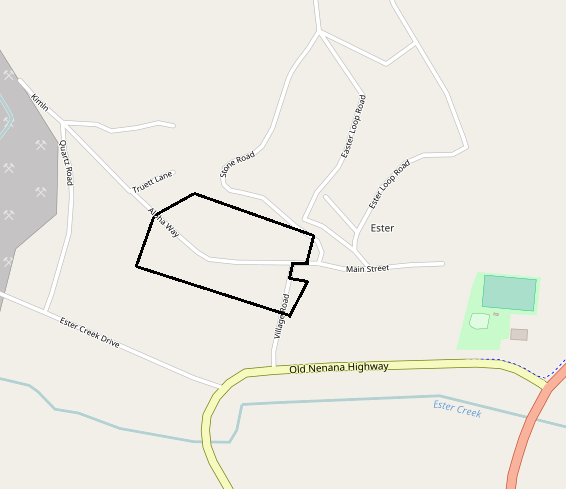
- Boundaries of Ester Camp Historic District
- Location: Off AK 3, Ester, Alaska
- Coordinates: 64°50′48″N 148°1′10″W
- Area: 11.4 acres (4.6 ha)
- Built: 1906
- Architect: Fairbanks Exploration Company
- NRHP reference No.: 87000703
- AHRS No.: FAI-204

Significant dates
- Added to NRHP: May 6, 1987
- Designated AHRS: 1984

Ester is a census-designated place (CDP) in Fairbanks North Star Borough, Alaska, United States. It is part of the Fairbanks, Alaska Metropolitan Statistical Area. As of the 2020 census, Ester had a population of 2,416. Although there are only around 12 houses located inside of the village, the rest are in the surrounding area. The Ester Camp Historic District is a historic district listed on the National Register of Historic Places. Ester was founded as a gold mining camp in the early 1900s, and the economy has focused on mining and services for miners. The Ester Volunteer Fire Department, John Trigg Ester Library, Ester Historic Society and Ester Post Office serve residents in Ester and surrounding areas. There is also a convenience store and secular chapel on the outskirts of the village. Many artists, writers, and musicians reside in Ester.

== Ester in geological and prehistoric time ==
The hydraulic mining technique of directing high pressurized streams of water onto the land to uncover gold revealed that Ester had rich deposits of fossils and bones of prehistoric animals. In the 1950s, Walter Wigger, who owned the Ester Creek Gold Mine, discovered a 198-pound mammoth tusk along Ester Creek. Images taken by tourists during the 1940s provide visual evidence of prehistoric animal remains, such as tusks, skulls, and large leg bones that were washed out by the process of stripping.

== History ==
=== Early history and founding ===
Ester was originally a gold mining camp on Ester Creek, with the first claim staked in February 1903 by Latham A. Jones. Jones worked with the Eagle Mining Company, the biggest claimholder on Glen Gulch in the Rampart mining district, but it was an independent miner, John "Jack" Mihalcik, a Czechoslovak immigrant born in 1866, who was the first person to actually discover gold in Ester Creek. Mihalcik staked his claim in November 1903 but the news of the discovery of gold did not become public until the following February. By 1907, Ester City had a population of around 200 people, with a thriving mining industry. A social hall was completed in 1907 and was well-known throughout the mining district for its dance floor. The hall was used for religious services as well as dances, movies, card games, parties, and other entertainment purposes. The town had five saloons and two hotels. In 1908 and 1910, the hall was the site of campaign speeches by candidates for the seat of Territorial Delegate. (Labor won in 1908, but Judge James Wickersham won the Ester precinct in 1910.) By 1909, Ester City had a baseball field, a doctor, a mine workers' union local, and a teacher, but gold production was beginning to decline.

The Berry Post Office moved in 1910 from near the Berry brothers' claim about two miles downstream from Ester City into J.C. Kinney's general store in Ester. The post office retained the name of Berry until 1965, when it was finally changed to that of the town it had been in for 55 years. In the mid-1920s, the Fairbanks Exploration Company began buying claims on Ester Creek, started operations in 1929, and in 1933 built a mess hall for their camp in Ester. The buildings are now a historic landmark used until 2008 as a tourist attraction, restaurant, and hotel. The F.E. Company revitalized the town, reshaping it to do large-scale open-pit mining using enormous floating dredges and draglines. In the process, much of the original sites of Berry and Ester were removed.

=== Since 1940 ===
In 1941, the Ester Community Association was founded in 1941. In 1958, The F.E. Company sold their Ester camp, and it reopened under new management as a historic resort. The Cripple Creek Resort, which later became the Ester Gold Camp, featured a musical variety show including Robert W. Service's poetry, held the Malemute Saloon, a local bar, featuring Service's poem, "The Shooting of Dan McGrew", until the resort closed in 2007. The Malemute Saloon continues to operate on selected weekends during the summer, and often features live music by local bands. In 1974, the Ester Volunteer Fire Department was officially founded after nearly a century of bucket brigades. Gold mining continued on a small scale. In 1986, the Ester Community Association, working with the Fairbanks North Star Borough, built the Ester Community Park, which became a local center of social activity. In 2017, the Ester Community Association purchased the park from a local resident, holding chili feeds, music festivals, and other fundraising events.

In 1987, the eleven surviving buildings of the F.E. Company's camp were listed on the National Register of Historic Places.

In 1988, Mushing magazine began publication in Ester and continued to be produced and published there until it was sold in 2005. The town became the site of a sled dog stage race between Ester and Nenana and back again, the Fireplug Sled Dog Race, which was held for ten years, from 1990 to 2001, and in which many famous mushers participated, including Dean Seibold and Jeff King. In January 1999, the town's first newspaper, The Ester Republic, was founded by Deirdre Helferrich; it was published regularly until 2015, and now is published sporadically. In August 1999, the John Trigg Ester Library (JTEL) opened a library named after a local resident who had started a book exchange in a nearby bar. In 2012, the JTEL received a donation of a local log cabin built in the 1940s and relocated many of its holdings to the new space. Today, the village features two saloons, five publishers, a library, a community hall, a secular chapel, a post office with its own zip code (99725), silversmiths and other artisans, numerous art studios, about two dozen homes, most of which were built by their owners, and three active gold mines. There is a fire station, a small store, and a secular chapel on the outskirts of the village.

The Ester Historic Society was founded in 2018. Its collection was donated by local residents and contains historical photographs, letters, and other documents. Along with the John Trigg Ester Library, the Ester Historic Society hosts talks and book readings about Ester and the surrounding area.

== Geography ==
Ester is located at 64°51′21″N 147°58′42″W (64.855700, -147.978434).

According to the United States Census Bureau, the CDP has a total area of 64.3 square miles (166.5 km^{2}), of which 64.2 square miles (166.4 km^{2}) is land and 0.04 square miles (0.1 km^{2}), or 0.08%, is water.

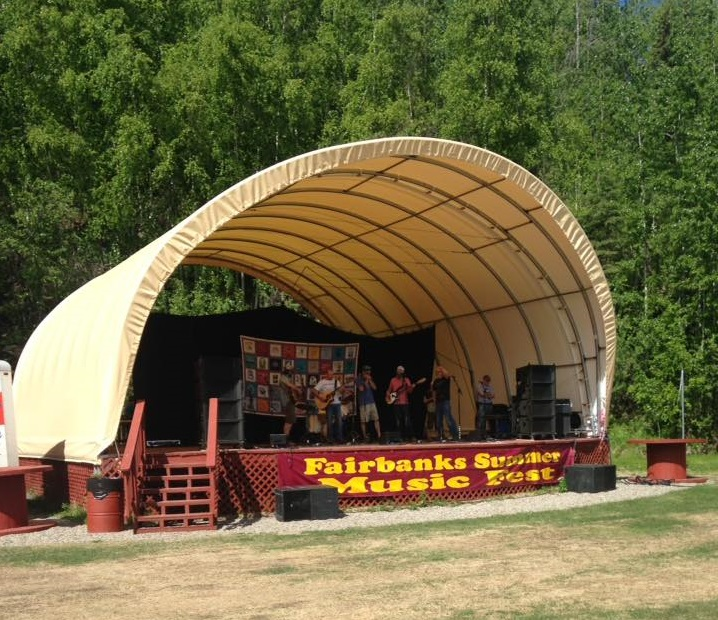
Dead Calm, a local band, performs at the 2017 Fairbanks Summer Folk Fest at the Ester Community Park.

=== Ester Community Park ===
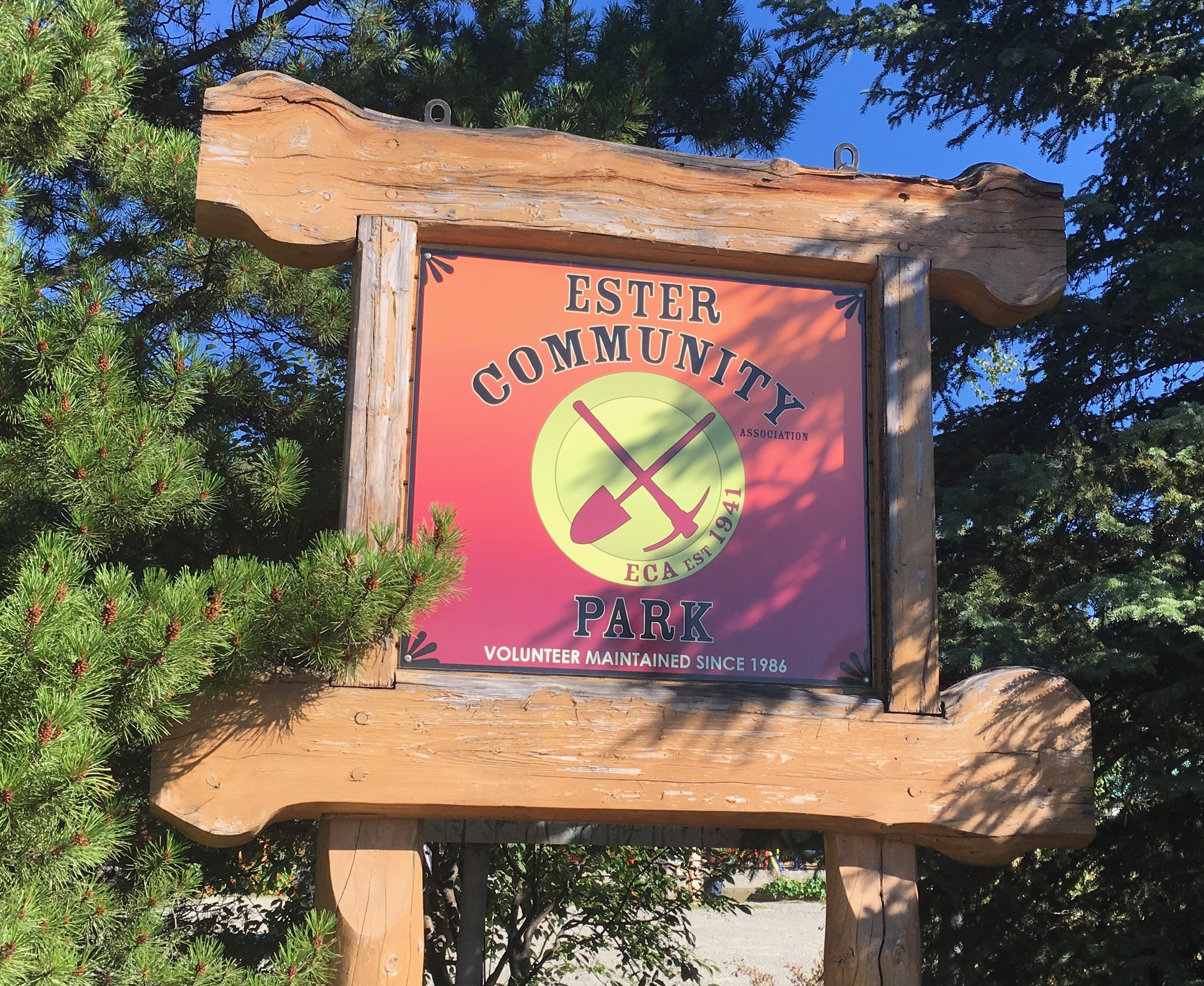
The sign greets visitors to Ester Community Park in Ester, Alaska

Ester has a well-used park, maintained and improved by the Ester Community Association's Park Committee and other volunteers from the community. The park has an ice rink that doubles as a basketball court in the summer, a children's playground, a picnic pavilion, a stage, and a soccer field. The park, situated next to the Ester Volunteer Fire Department, is the site of numerous soccer games, Ester Football League games, broomball, the Fourth of July picnic, musical gatherings, and other events throughout the year. In the summer, there is a farmers' market on Thursday evenings where local farmers and gardeners sell their goods. In 2017, the Ester Community Association purchased the park from a local landowner.

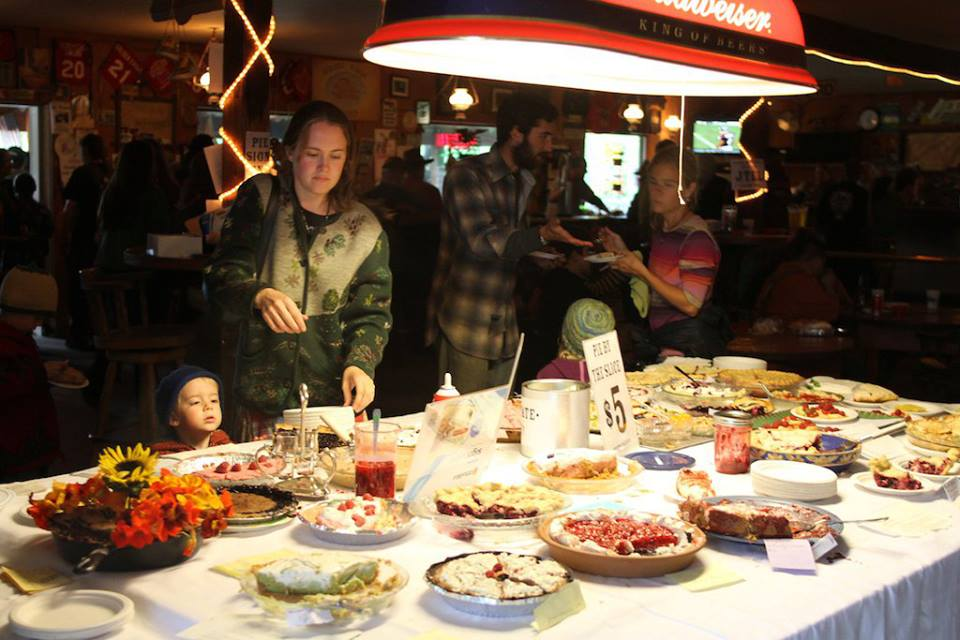
The John Trigg Ester Library (JTEL) sponsors an annual pie contest, the LiBerry Pie Contest, to raise funds for the library. All pies must contain a type of berry, broadly conceived.

=== The village square ===
Ester village wraps around a square at the foot of Ester Lump, the name of a bump on the side of Ester Dome. This "town square" is actually the parking lot of the Golden Eagle Saloon, divided in two sections by Main Street, but functions as a focal point and central gathering place during celebrations such as the Fourth of July and New Year's Eve. Private residences, the John Trigg Ester Library, and the Golden Eagle Saloon surround the square.

=== Tailings ===
Due to the mining in the area, Ester is currently surrounded by piles of gravel and dirt tailings.

=== Climate ===
Ester has a subarctic climate (Köppen Dfc).

Climate data for Ester, Alaska, 1991–2020 normals, extremes 1997–present
Month	Jan	Feb	Mar	Apr	May	Jun	Jul	Aug	Sep	Oct	Nov	Dec	Year
Record high °F (°C)	50 (10)	46 (8)	60 (16)	77 (25)	87 (31)	92 (33)	91 (33)	92 (33)	76 (24)	74 (23)	42 (6)	39 (4)	92 (33)
Mean maximum °F (°C)	26.1 (−3.3)	36.2 (2.3)	46.9 (8.3)	60.7 (15.9)	80.1 (26.7)	85.4 (29.7)	86.5 (30.3)	80.2 (26.8)	70.1 (21.2)	56.3 (13.5)	29.3 (−1.5)	27.6 (−2.4)	87.8 (31.0)
Mean daily maximum °F (°C)	−0.3 (−17.9)	11.0 (−11.7)	25.2 (−3.8)	44.9 (7.2)	61.2 (16.2)	71.0 (21.7)	71.9 (22.2)	64.9 (18.3)	54.2 (12.3)	33.4 (0.8)	11.2 (−11.6)	3.2 (−16.0)	37.6 (3.1)
Daily mean °F (°C)	−7.7 (−22.1)	0.7 (−17.4)	10.3 (−12.1)	31.6 (−0.2)	47.6 (8.7)	58.1 (14.5)	60.5 (15.8)	54.1 (12.3)	42.8 (6.0)	24.4 (−4.2)	3.2 (−16.0)	−4.2 (−20.1)	26.8 (−2.9)
Mean daily minimum °F (°C)	−15.0 (−26.1)	−9.7 (−23.2)	−4.6 (−20.3)	18.3 (−7.6)	34.1 (1.2)	45.3 (7.4)	49.2 (9.6)	43.4 (6.3)	31.3 (−0.4)	15.4 (−9.2)	−4.7 (−20.4)	−11.6 (−24.2)	16.0 (−8.9)
Mean minimum °F (°C)	−43.8 (−42.1)	−39.0 (−39.4)	−31.7 (−35.4)	−6.6 (−21.4)	19.1 (−7.2)	29.7 (−1.3)	34.1 (1.2)	27.3 (−2.6)	15.5 (−9.2)	−7.4 (−21.9)	−29.5 (−34.2)	−35.9 (−37.7)	−45.4 (−43.0)
Record low °F (°C)	−55 (−48)	−58 (−50)	−43 (−42)	−32 (−36)	9 (−13)	24 (−4)	27 (−3)	23 (−5)	0 (−18)	−20 (−29)	−42 (−41)	−52 (−47)	−58 (−50)
Average precipitation inches (mm)	0.67 (17)	0.61 (15)	0.53 (13)	0.41 (10)	0.68 (17)	2.08 (53)	2.70 (69)	2.83 (72)	1.51 (38)	0.89 (23)	0.89 (23)	0.75 (19)	14.55 (370)
Source: NOAA (mean maxima/minima 2006–2020)

== Economy ==
The local saw has it that "Ester is still around because there is a McDonald's in Fairbanks." This is true both culturally and economically. Many Ester residents are employed in Fairbanks or at the University of Alaska Fairbanks, although there are many small Ester-area businesses and self-employed people. The largest Ester employers are seasonal, with Judie Gumm Designs, and the local mines as the businesses with the most employees. Fairbanks provides a market for Ester products and services and thus helps to keep the small Ester economy alive. Because Fairbanks acts as a draw (due to its larger market and resources) for such things as big-box stores and fast food chains, Ester has been able to retain its mining village feel. This is important to Ester's tourist economy, which capitalizes on the status of the gold camp buildings as a historic landmark. In fall 2007, the owners of the Ester Gold Camp (Malemute, Inc.) announced that they would not reopen the resort in 2008, but do open the camp bar (the Malemute Saloon) for a 30-day period each summer to retain the liquor license. This has had an effect on Ester's summer economy, and resulted in the closure of at least two shops, in anticipation of the dearth of tourists.

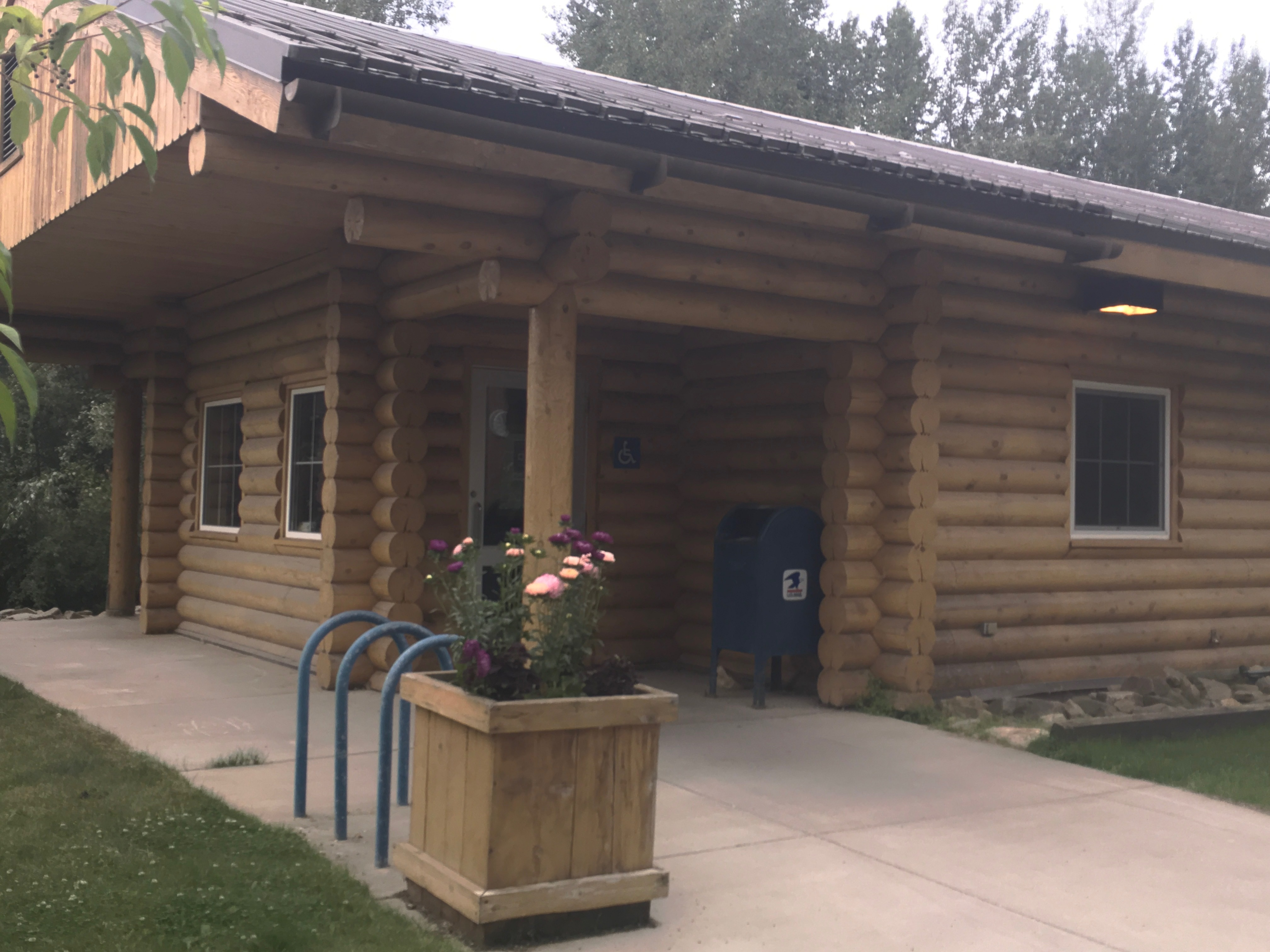
The Ester Post Office, on Village Road, is constructed of locally sourced spruce logs.

In response to the closure of the Gold Camp, a group of local business owners have formed the EMCE (or Ester Ministry of Community Enterprise), which has been accepted as an ad hoc committee of the Ester Community Association, to support Ester-area businesses and craftspeople. The EMCE occasionally sponsors a local open-air farmers' market, and a Planting Day to beautify the village.

== Demographics ==
Historical population
Census	Pop.	Note	%±
1910	213		—
1940	218		—
1950	74		−66.1%
1960	81		9.5%
1970	264		225.9%
1980	149		−43.6%
1990	147		−1.3%
2000	1,680		1,042.9%
2010	2,422		44.2%
2020	2,416		−0.2%
U.S. Decennial Census

Ester first appeared on the 1910 U.S. Census as an unincorporated village (erroneously as "Esther"). It did not appear again until 1940 and has reported on each successive census. In 1980, it was made a census-designated place (CDP).

=== 2020 census ===
As of the 2020 census, Ester had a population of 2,416. The median age was 36.8 years. 18.1% of residents were under the age of 18 and 14.4% of residents were 65 years of age or older. For every 100 females there were 117.5 males, and for every 100 females age 18 and over there were 121.0 males age 18 and over.

39.9% of residents lived in urban areas, while 60.1% lived in rural areas.

There were 1,106 households in Ester, of which 20.0% had children under the age of 18 living in them. Of all households, 36.3% were married-couple households, 30.0% were households with a male householder and no spouse or partner present, and 23.2% were households with a female householder and no spouse or partner present. About 42.1% of all households were made up of individuals and 10.5% had someone living alone who was 65 years of age or older.

There were 1,300 housing units, of which 14.9% were vacant. The homeowner vacancy rate was 2.4% and the rental vacancy rate was 12.1%.

Racial composition as of the 2020 census
Race	Number	Percent
White	1,937	80.2%
Black or African American	27	1.1%
American Indian and Alaska Native	188	7.8%
Asian	30	1.2%
Native Hawaiian and Other Pacific Islander	7	0.3%
Some other race	25	1.0%
Two or more races	202	8.4%
Hispanic or Latino (of any race)	81	3.4%

=== 2010 census ===
As of the census of 2010, there were 2,422 people, 727 households, and 534 families residing in the CDP. The population density was 34.7 inhabitants per square mile (13.4/km^{2}). There were 1,229 housing units at an average density of 19.1 per square mile (7.4/km^{2}). The racial/ethnic makeup of the CDP was 84.6% White, 2.1% Black or African American, 6.7% Alaska Native or Native American, 1.2% Asian, 0.2% Pacific Islander, 0.6% from other races, and 4.6% from two or more races. Hispanic or Latino of any race were 3.3% of the population.

There were 1,069 households, out of which 22.4% had children under the age of 18 living with them, 41.1% were married couples living together, 6.1% had a female householder with no husband present, and 50.0% were non-families. 39.2% of all households were made up of individuals, and 5.4% had someone living alone who was 65 years of age or older. The average household size was 2.14 and the average family size was 2.90.

In the CDP the population was spread out, with 18.8% under the age of 18, 12.1% from 18 to 24, 33.2% from 25 to 44, 29.0% from 45 to 64, and 6.9% who were 65 years of age or older. The median age was 35 years. For every 100 females, there were 119.8 males. For every 100 females aged 18 and over, there were 122.2 males.

=== 2000 census ===
As of the census of 2000, there were 1,680 people, 727 households, and 386 families residing in the CDP. The population density was 26.0 inhabitants per square mile (10.0/km^{2}). There were 814 housing units at an average density of 12.6 per square mile (4.9/km^{2}). The racial/ethnic makeup of the CDP was 87.4% White, 0.9% Black or African American, 4.6% Alaska Native or Native American, 0.7% Asian, 0.3% Pacific Islander, 1.0% from other races, and 5.1% from two or more races. Hispanic or Latino of any race were 2.5% of the population.

There were 727 households, out of which 28.5% had children under the age of 18 living with them, 43.1% were married couples living together, 6.5% had a female householder with no husband present, and 46.9% were non-families. 35.2% of all households were made up of individuals, and 1.0% had someone living alone who was 65 years of age or older. The average household size was 2.20 and the average family size was 2.91.

In the CDP the population was spread out, with 22.7% under the age of 18, 8.2% from 18 to 24, 40.8% from 25 to 44, 25.8% from 45 to 64, and 2.4% who were 65 years of age or older. The median age was 34 years. For every 100 females, there were 119.6 males. For every 100 females aged 18 and over, there were 116.3 males.

The median income for a household in the CDP was $50,461, and the median income for a family was $73,750. Males had a median income of $41,713 versus $24,850 for females. The per capita income for the CDP was $29,155. About 4.9% of families and 8.1% of the population were below the poverty line, including 9.8% of those under age 18 and none of those age 65 or over.

== Wildlife ==
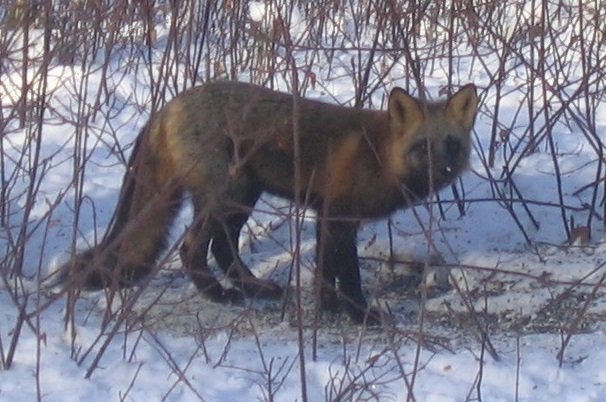
A cross fox in Ester, Alaska. Other fox morphs spotted in Ester include silver and red foxes.

Because the village is surrounded by boreal forests, Alaska moose, ermine, snowshoe hare, red foxes, least shrew, Canada lynx, American red squirrel, porcupine, red-backed vole, and other northern mammals are commonly seen in Ester. Coyotes and American black bears are seasonal visitors. Interior Alaskan wolves are occasionally spotted. Many bird species thrive in the area such as black-capped chickadee, boreal chickadee, hawk owl, cliff swallow, hairy woodpecker, spruce grouse, ruffed grouse, ruby-crowned kinglet, trumpeter swan, Canada jay, raven, and pine grosbeak. Owls include great horned owl, boreal owl, and great grey owl.

Insects common in Ester include numerous species of bumblebees, hornets, yellow jackets, and wasps. Butterflies include Canadian swallowtail, mourning cloak, painted lady, arctic fritillary, Mormon fritillary, and clouded sulphur. Damselflies and dragonflies are also commonly spotted in Ester, as are several types of moths. There are over 35 different species of mosquitoes, some of which emerge while there is still snow on the ground in April.

== Ester culture ==
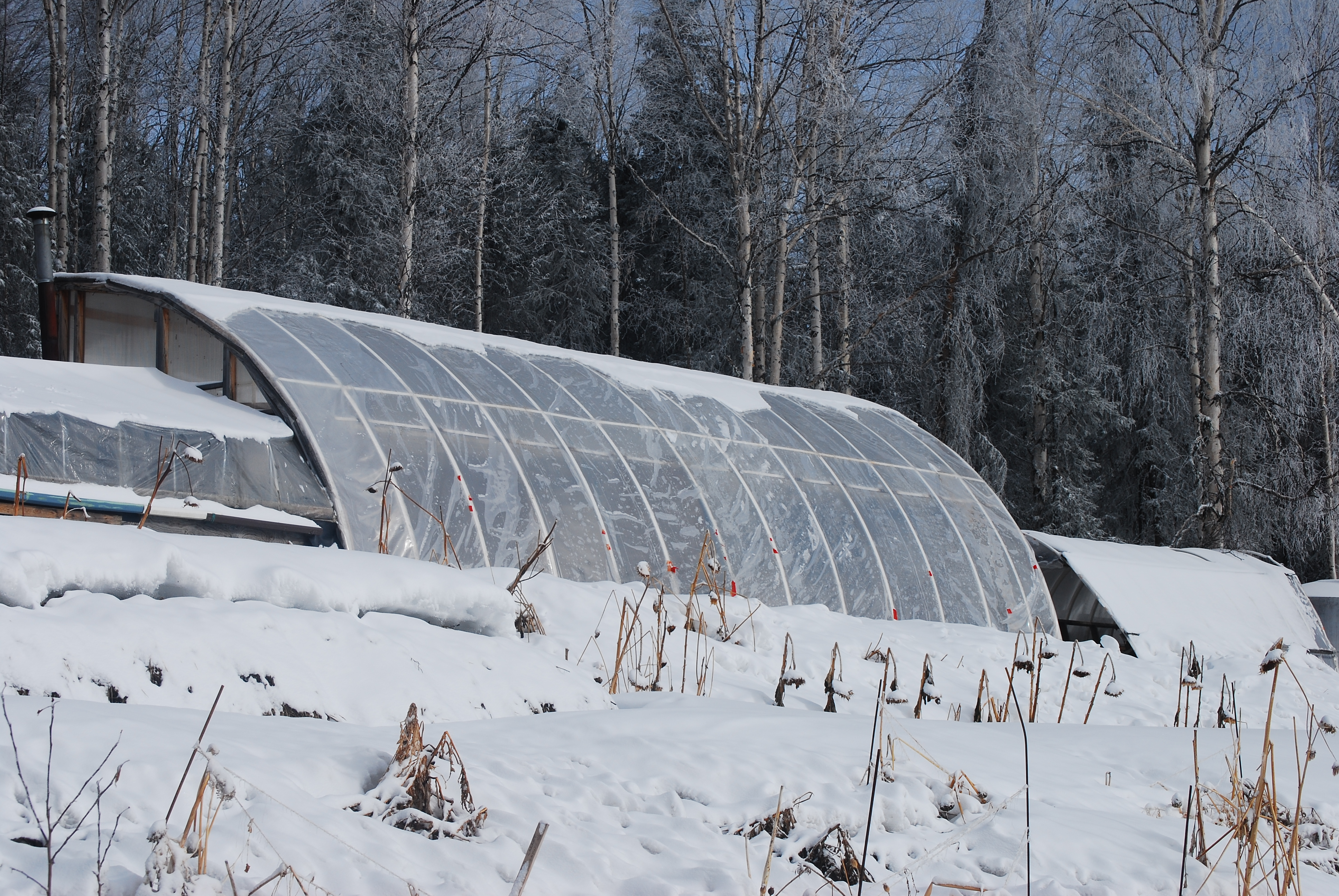
Greenhouse at Calypso Farm and Ecology Center, in winter

=== Agriculture and subsistence ===
Fishing, hunting, and food gathering are important aspects of Alaskan living in general, both for recreation and for subsistence, and Ester is no exception. The community is zoned as rural, despite its proximity to the state's second-largest city. Many Ester residents fish and/or hunt, and berry- and mushroom-picking are regular seasonal activities. Gardening has long been a part of Ester's culture, and farming has been growing in popularity since 2000, which saw the establishment of Calypso Farm & Ecology Center in the hills near the village. Calypso provides community-supported agriculture shares for over 80 families, with other CSAs starting up in the area. The Ester library has a seed library program. The John Trigg Ester Library has long had a small community garden at its grounds on Main Street, and expanded them in 2023 to include new beds at the future Passiv Haus community center/library grounds on Village Road.

=== Art ===
Ester has a strong art community, including painters, photographers, collagists, sculptors, metalsmiths, and woodworkers. It has hosted an annual intercontinental simultaneous art exhibit since 2000, the BiPolar Art Show, with the MAAG (the Mechanical Equipment Center Alternative Art Gallery) in McMurdo, Antarctica. Three commercial galleries and several private studios provide sales venues for local and other artists.

An informal mixed media 'school of assemblage' may be said to exist in Ester: several local artists rely on dumpster finds, printed materials, and historically significant items in their artwork, with themes relating to religious iconography, local history, and political satire.

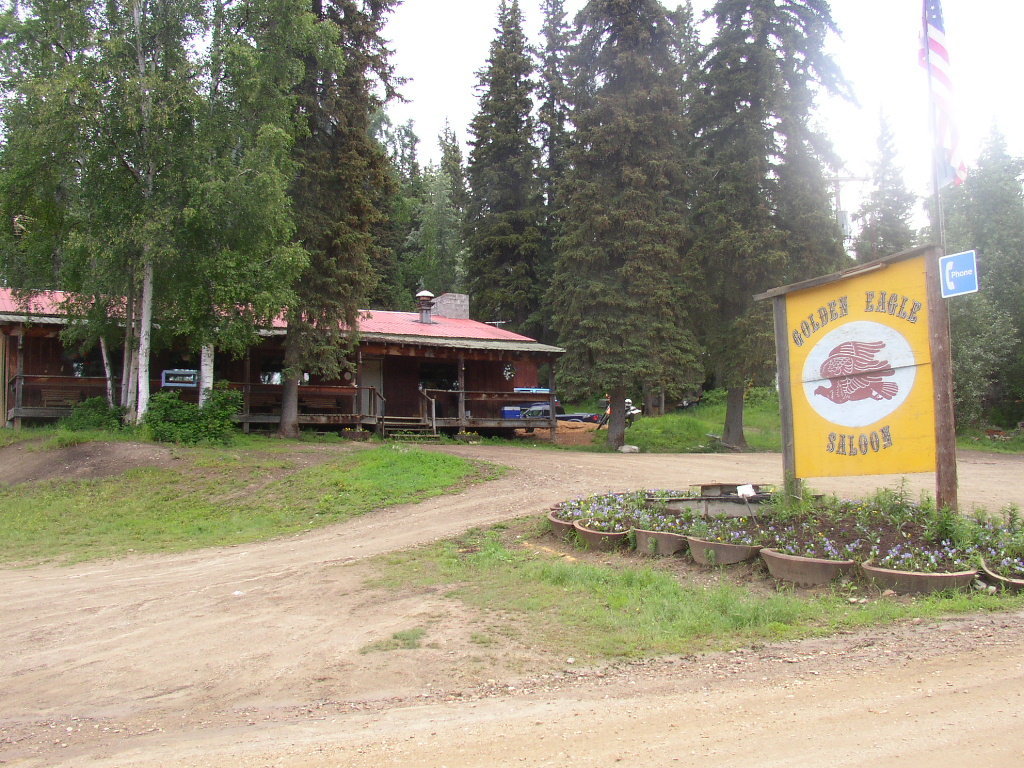
The Golden Eagle Saloon is located in the center of downtown Ester

=== Mining ===
Mines, having been the central reason for the village's existence for most of its history, are still important in Ester culture. Old dredge parts and mining equipment can be found in the forest that has grown up around the village since major dredging ended in the 1960s, some of which have been incorporated into artistic works. The Malemute Saloon's variety show capitalizes on the town's mining history, particularly the influence of Clarence Berry, whose mine at 8 Below Discovery Claim was the largest and most successful in the Ester area during its early history. Ester Dome continues to attract large mining concerns, and several small-scale gold mines provide residents with income.

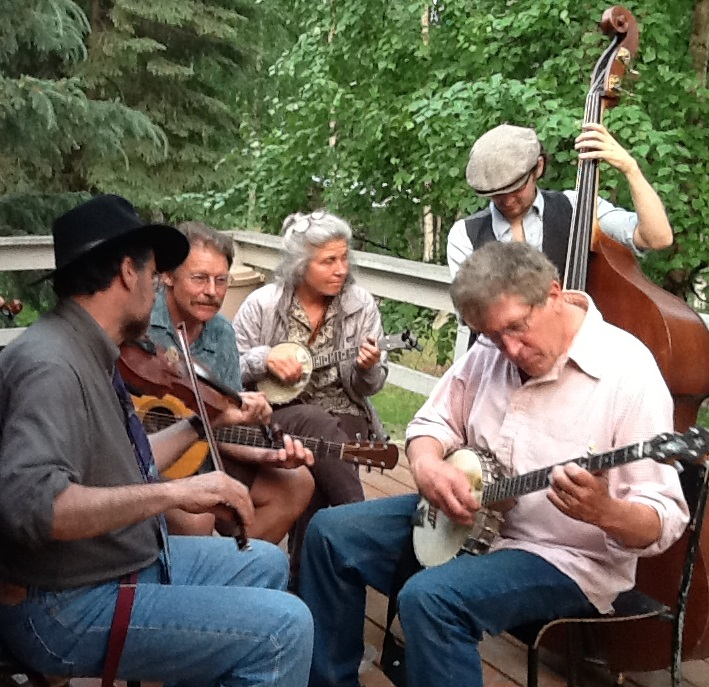
Lost Dog String Band playing on the porch at Hartung Hall in downtown Ester

=== Music ===
Ester has a vibrant local music culture, and is the site of several annual music festivals: Angry Young & Poor (also known as AYP), a free all-day concert oriented toward area youth; the Fairbanks Summer Folk Fest, a 35-year old folk festival; the LiBerry Music Festival & Pie Throwdown, a fundraiser for the John Trigg Ester Library; and Ester Fest, a family-friendly musical fundraiser for the Ester Community Park which held its inaugural festival in 2017. An old time string band gathering, the Ester Jelly Jam, has an open jam occasionally on Sunday afternoons at Hartung Hall. A local group, the Lost Dog Old-Time String Band, hosts a monthly square/contra dance there. Impromptu music jams occur nightly on the saloon porches in the summer, and every Sunday in the winter. Sundays at the Golden Eagle are smoke free. Area venues and events regularly feature local, live music.

=== Newspaper ===
The town's first newspaper was The Ester Republic, published monthly from January 1999 to 2012. It was founded by Deirdre Helfferich and operated out of her home, and for a time had its office space at the Ester post office. Notable contributors included Richard A. Fineberg, John Haines, Dahr Jamail, along with art from cartoonists Jamie Smith and Daniel Darrow.

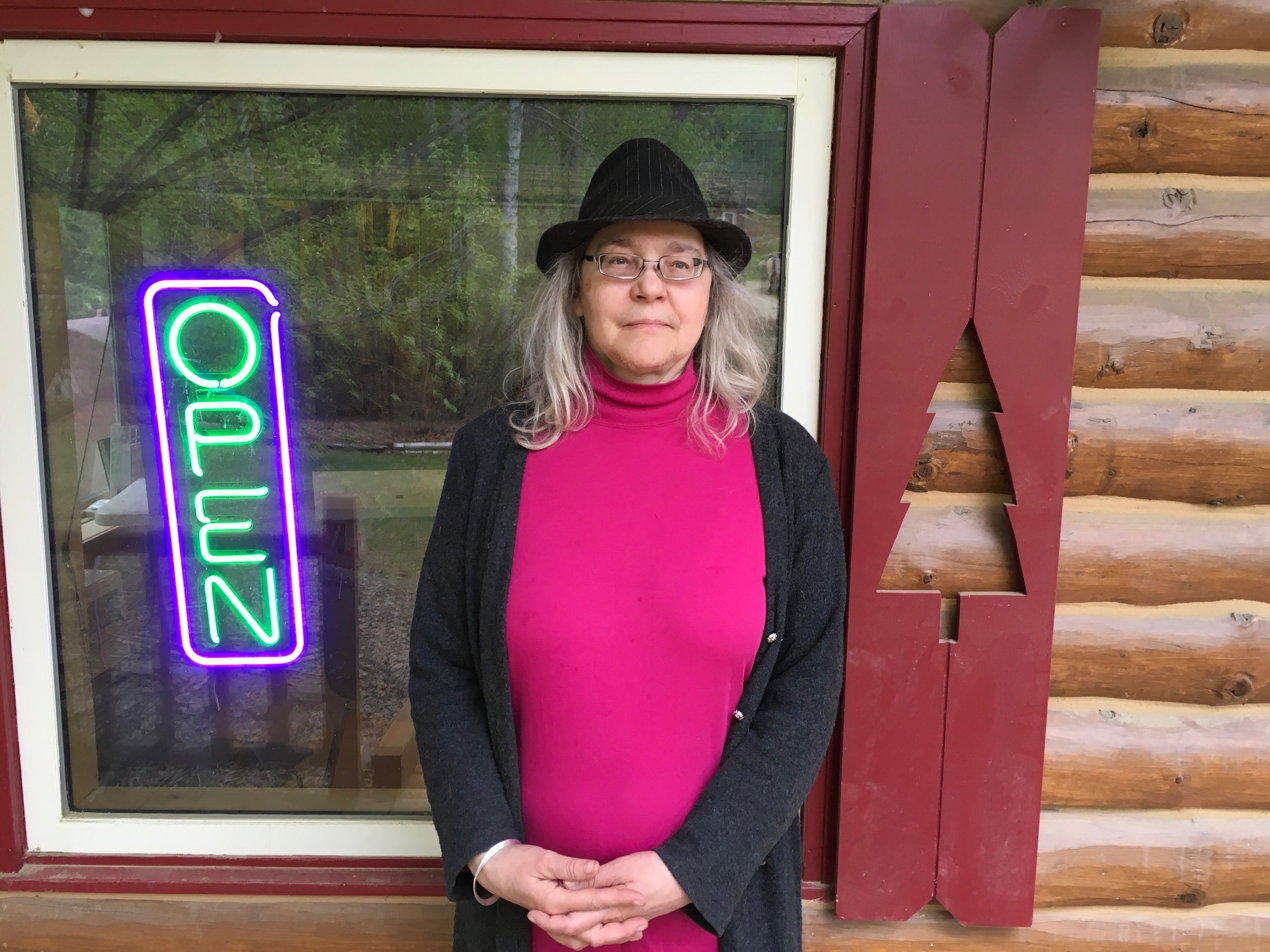
Deirdre Helfferich is one of the key figures in the founding of the John Trigg Ester Library.

=== Parade ===
The Ester Community Association sponsors an annual Fourth of July parade that travels from the village square on Main Street past the post office, turning left onto Old Nenana Highway and ending about one mile away at the Ester Community Park. The parade features giant puppets, a children's bike brigade, small scale floats frequently with satirical themes, antique cars and trucks, and dancing by the crew of the Ester Volunteer Fire Department or other groups. Summer residents of Calypso Farm throw vegetables to the crowd, and local politicians and community organizations hand out literature and candy. Lady Liberty and Uncle Sam are usually in the parade. Prizes vary from year to year, but usually include Best Bribe, the Golden Banana, or Best Choreography. The Red Hackle Pipe Band, a local music group which plays authentic Scottish bagpipes, drums, and flutes, traditionally begins the parade. The parade is followed by a community potluck featuring a pig roast, live music, and games. A local water delivery business, Water Wagon, sprays water on children and others who want to cool off. One local newspaper, the Fairbanks News-Miner, wrote this of the 2017 parade: "The people of Ester’s eccentric brand of patriotism was on display once more at the Fourth of July parade and potluck Tuesday afternoon."

=== Politics ===
Ester tends to be a liberal and left-leaning area within the Fairbanks North Star Borough. In the 2016 presidential election, 54% of the votes went to Democrat compared to 32% for Republican Donald Trump. There was a wide range in election results in the precincts surrounding Ester; results ranged from 18% to 62% for Clinton, and from 20% to 70% for Trump. In the 2018 election for governor, Democrat Mark Begich received 295 votes (65%) compared to 139 votes (31%) for Republican Mike Dunleavy.

The Ester voting precinct typically has relatively high voter turnout (~30% or more) in municipal elections (precinct 130 in District 08). Ursa Major distillery serves as the precinct's polling place; in years past polling took place in the fire department, and the community center, Hartung Hall. Party affiliation tends strongly toward the Democrats, followed by the Republicans, with Greens and Alaska Independence Party voters in a rough tie for third. The majority of Ester's residents are listed on state records as unaffiliated or undeclared.

=== Public library ===
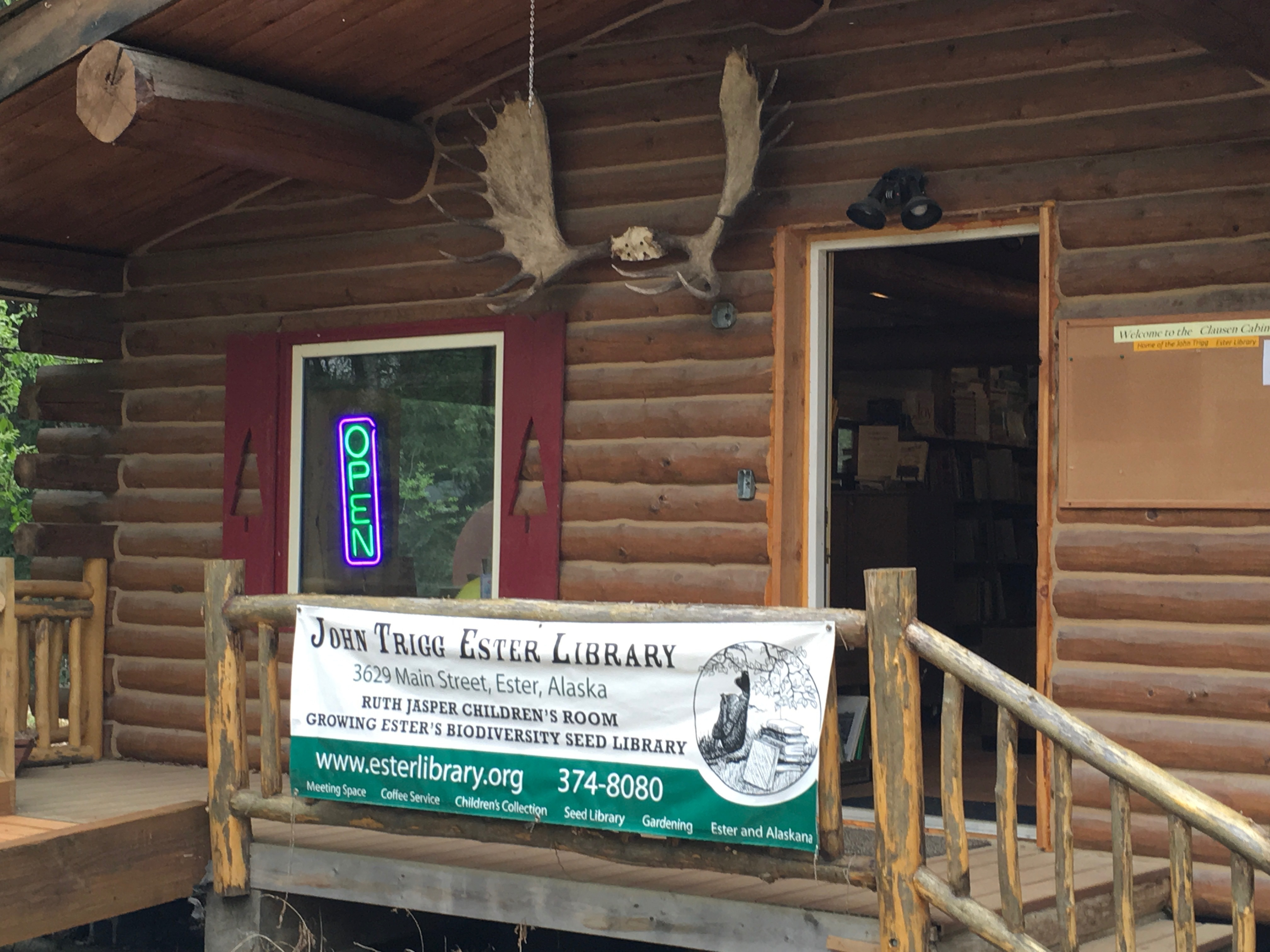
John Trigg Ester Library Clausen Cabin

The John Trigg Ester Library is a nonprofit library located in Ester. It was founded in 1999 and is managed by the Ester Community Association. The library is open to the public, and is supported by grants, fundraising, and membership fees. It is housed in a historic log building known as the Ansgar & Ida Clausen Cabin. It is a member of the Alaska Library Association and uses LibraryThing for its online catalog.

The library has approximately 6,000 volumes on its shelves with more than 15,000 in storage. Much of the library's collection of science, science fiction, fantasy, and mystery titles were originally from Trigg's private library or donated by his family. Other major collections include books from Sue Ann Bowling, the Helfferich family, Robert Barr, Richard Heacox, the Guinn family, Four Winds Counseling, and the estates of David Stannis and Raymond Hadley, among others.

== Notable people ==
- Clarence Berry, businessman and successful gold miner
- Richard A. Fineberg, investigative journalist
- Magnus Colcord "Rusty" Heurlin, painter

== See also ==
- National Register of Historic Places listings in Fairbanks North Star Borough, Alaska
