= William Ransom Wood =

American academic administrator

William Ransom Wood (February 3, 1907 – February 25, 2001) was an American politician and leader of the University of Alaska.

Wood was born near Jacksonville, Morgan County, Illinois. He was an Episcopalian. He served in the U.S. Navy during World War II. He became vice president of the University of Nevada.

== University of Alaska ==
Wood assumed the presidency of the University of Alaska in 1960, serving in this capacity at the university for the next 13 years. During his presidency, the Fairbanks campus gained a new residence hall complex, gymnasium, classroom buildings, a heating and power plant, a library-fine arts complex, and a campus activity center. In 1964 an area was selected on the campus' West Ridge for further expansion, primarily of research facilities. The first of these was the Alaska Water Laboratory, built and operated by the U.S. Public Health Service. A building for biological research and a new facility for the burgeoning Geophysical Institute went up on the ridge.

Wood served on national and international education boards and committees and was very active in the Alaska community. His wife, Dorothy Jane, is widely acknowledged as an important element in his success. During his tenure as president and afterward, he wrote books of poetry which were published by the University of Alaska Foundation.

=== Project Chariot ===
Wood strongly supported Project Chariot, which was a proposal by Edward Teller to use nuclear bombs to create a harbor at Cape Thompson. Two University of Alaska scientists who publicly opposed this project, William Pruitt and Leslie Viereck, were forced out of their jobs by Wood's administration.

=== Wood Center ===
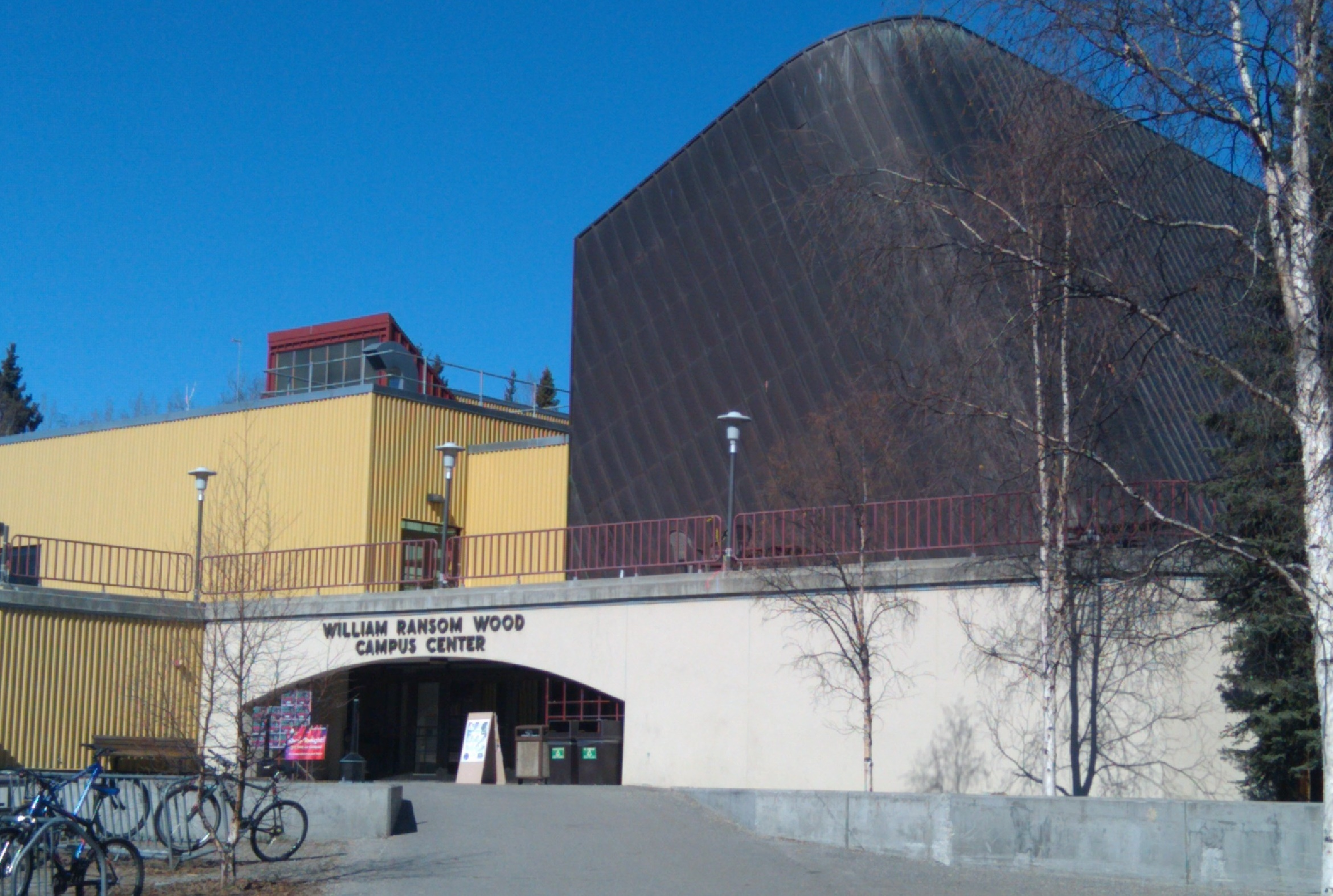
William Ransom Wood Campus Center (south elevation) in April 2011. Construction began on an expansion of the building in 2013.

The William Ransom Wood Center was dedicated on Sept. 29, 1972. Originally, it was decided that the new center would be totally paid for by university students. The Associated Students of the University of Alaska successfully lobbied the state legislature to provide a special, $4 million low-interest construction loan, which would be paid back from student fees over 25 years. However, in 1980, state Rep. Brian Rogers succeeded in passing a legislative appropriation to take over the remainder of the debt payments for the center. The name of the building was changed before construction was complete to honor Wood, which caused some controversy among the student body of the time.

The building was designed by a former UA student as a solution to cabin fever. The center features a ballroom and adjoining conference rooms, an eight-lane bowling alley, six pool tables, a darkroom, a multilevel lounge, a pub, coffee and espresso café, a pizza place, a large grill and food court, and an inspirational “staircase to nowhere." Wood Center is also home to Student Activities and Outdoor Adventures, Associated Students of UAF, the student senate, and UAF’s student newspaper, the Sun Star.

The “stairs to nowhere” in the center of the building (also called the Bird’s Nest) are there because the Wood Center was originally designed to have three floors, and when construction plans changed due to unforeseen permafrost problems, the stairs had already been built.

== Public life ==
After his retirement from UA in 1973, he served as mayor of Fairbanks from 1978-1980. He helped lead the creation of Fairbanks Memorial Hospital and continued in his strong commitment to the beautification of Fairbanks through the Festival Fairbanks Foundation. His efforts included the Golden Heart Plaza and the Cushman Street Bridge of Flags, among many others. Wood remained active on the University of Alaska Foundation Board of Trustees. He was also president emeritus. Wood and his wife were both given honorary doctorates by the University of Alaska Board of Regents in 1990.

- City of Fairbanks mayoral runoff election, October 24, 1978
  - William R. Wood - 1,940 (55.9%)
  - Chuck Rees - 1,533 (44.1%)
