= Gerald W. Johnson =

Gerald W. Johnson may refer to:

- Gerald W. Johnson (journalist) (1890–1980), America journalist, editor, essayist, historian, biographer, and novelist
- Gerald W. Johnson (nuclear expert) (1917–2005), American nuclear expert and negotiator
- Gerald W. Johnson (military officer) (1919-2002), American fighter ace and Lieutenant General
- Gerald W. Johnson (Publisher) (1925- 2026), Publisher, Civil Rights leader and Businessman
