= Project Chariot =

1958 harbor project using nukes in Alaska, US

Coordinates: 68°06′01″N 165°45′55″W

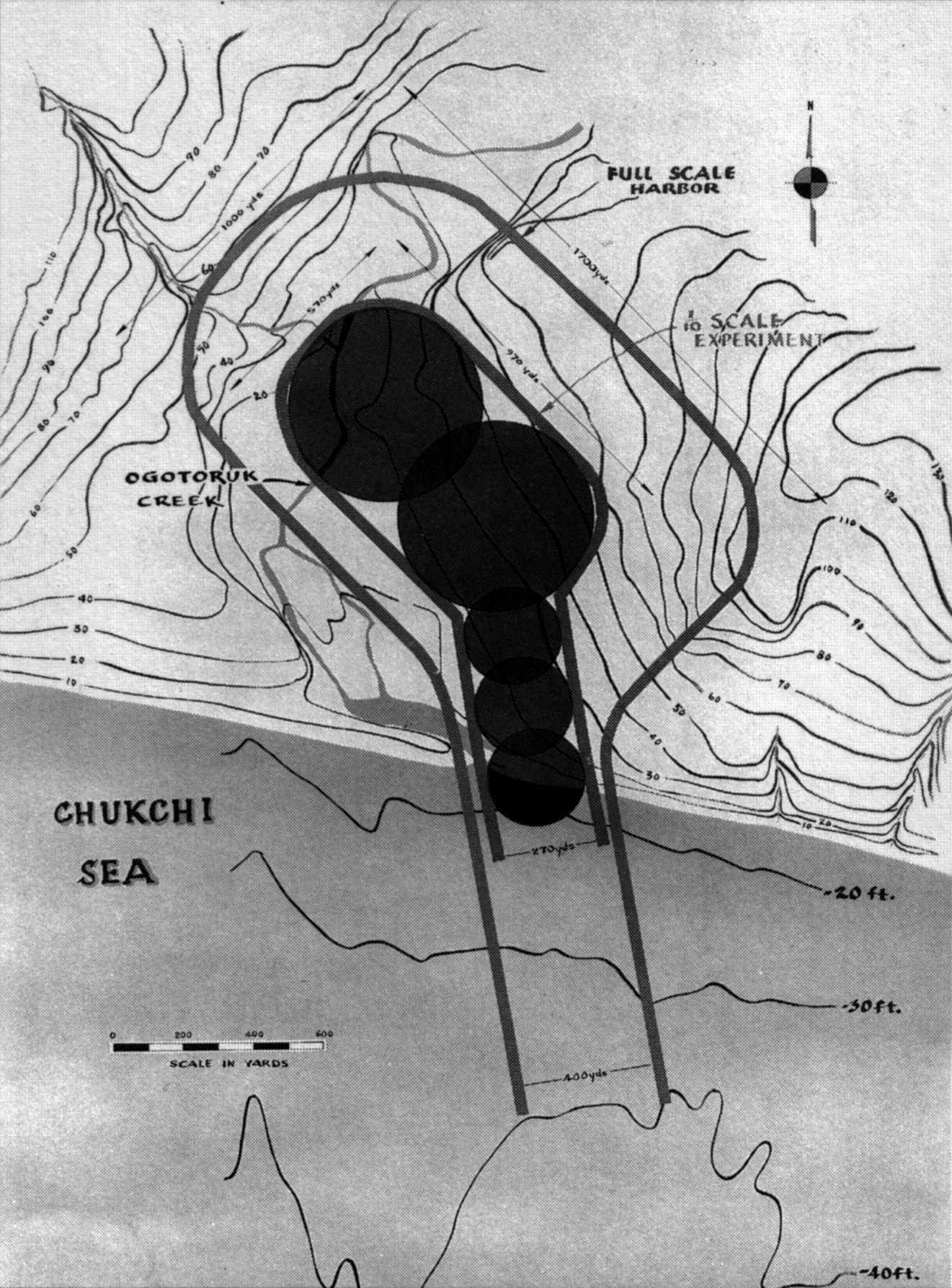
One of the Chariot schemes involved chaining five thermonuclear devices to create the artificial harbor. The illustration shows both the original extent of excavation, and a reduced scope.

Project Chariot was a 1958 United States Atomic Energy Commission proposal to construct an artificial harbor at Cape Thompson on the North Slope of the U.S. state of Alaska by burying and detonating a string of nuclear devices.

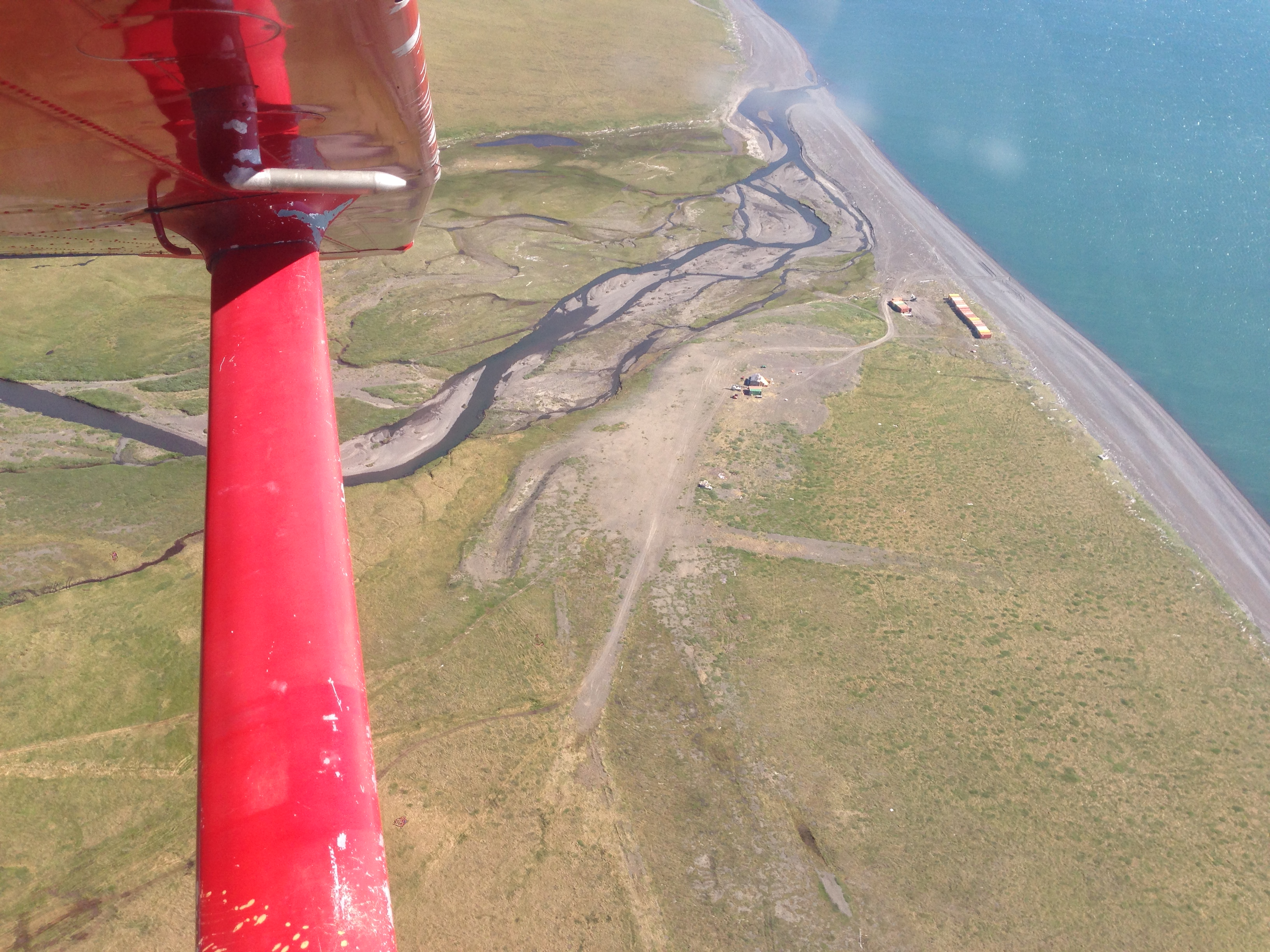
Aerial shot of Chariot, AK, located near Cape Thompson, the proposed site of an artificial harbor to be created using chained nuclear explosions.

The project originated as part of Operation Plowshare, a research project to find peaceful uses for nuclear explosives. Substantial local opposition, objections from physical and social scientists engaged in environmental studies, and the absence of any credible economic benefit caused the plan to be quietly shelved.

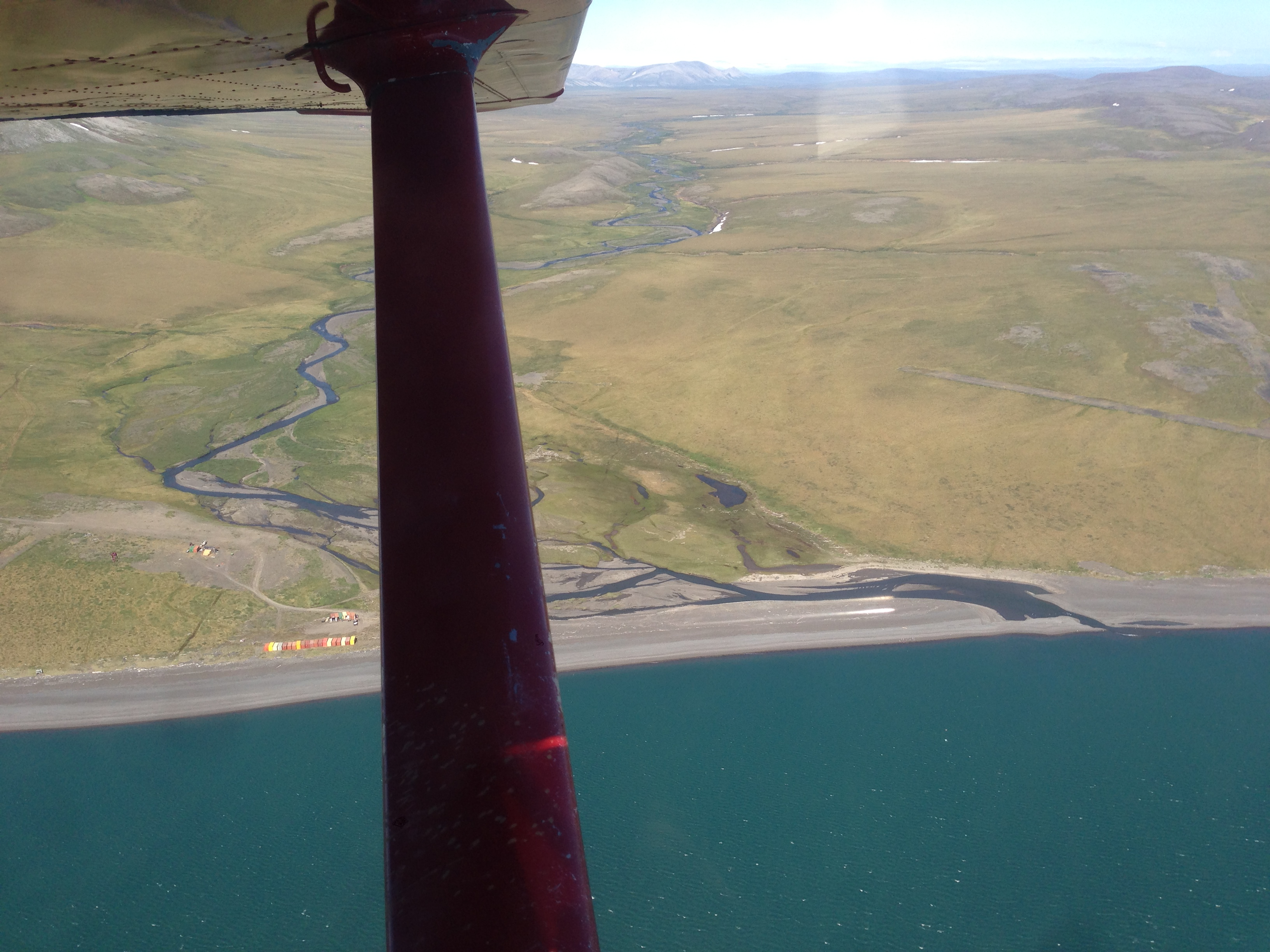
Aerial shot of Chariot, AK looking to the east

== History ==
A 1957 meeting at the Lawrence Radiation Laboratory (LRL) proposed a program to use nuclear explosives for industrial development projects. This proposal became the basis for Project Plowshare, administered by the United States Atomic Energy Commission. Chariot was to be the first Plowshare project, and was imagined as a way to show how larger projects, such as a sea-level Panama Canal, or a sea-level Nicaragua Canal, might be accomplished.

The plan was championed by LRL director and nuclear scientist Edward Teller, who traveled throughout Alaska touting the harbor as an important economic development for America's newest state. Teller promoted a study, contracted by LRL, that proposed development of coal deposits in Northern Alaska. Teller and the LRL proposed the harbor as a port for coal shipment, even though the harbor and surrounding Chukchi Sea would be frozen for nine months of the year. The mines themselves would have been on the far side of the Brooks Range, requiring a railroad and storage facilities for the coal waiting to be shipped.

As the plan developed, relatively small explosions in Nevada, some previously planned, indicated that small blasts could accomplish much of the publicly-stated goals of the project with reduced releases of radioactive contamination. However, as Alaskan business leaders showed there was no economic justification for it, the project shifted to a more clearly avowed program for testing nuclear excavation in a remote location.

Alaskan political leaders, newspaper editors, president William Ransom Wood of the University of Alaska, and even church groups all rallied in support of the detonation. Congress had passed the Alaska Statehood Act just a few weeks before. An editorial in the July 24, 1958 Fairbanks Daily News-Miner said, "We think the holding of a huge nuclear blast in Alaska would be a fitting overture to the new era which is opening for our state."

== Opposition and abandonment ==
Opposition came from the Inupiaq Alaska Native village of Point Hope, a few scientists engaged in environmental studies under AEC contract, and a handful of conservationists. The grassroots protest soon was picked up by organizations with national reach, such as The Wilderness Society, the Sierra Club, and Barry Commoner's Committee for Nuclear Information. Repeated visits to the community by AEC officials failed to sway local and Native residents, who opposed land transfers by the Bureau of Land Management (BLM) to the AEC. The opposition to Project Chariot that emerged from Point Hope launched a period of Native political organization and activism that led directly to the passage of the landmark Alaska Native Claims Settlement Act of 1971.

Internationally, the project drew objections from the Soviet Union, which viewed such projects as a way of circumventing the Partial Nuclear Test Ban Treaty, which was in negotiation at the time.

In 1962, facing increased public uneasiness over the environmental risk and the potential to disrupt the lives of the Alaska Native peoples, the AEC announced that Project Chariot would be "held in abeyance." It has never been formally canceled.

In addition to the objections of the local population, no practical use of such a harbor was ever identified. The environmental studies commissioned by the AEC suggested that radioactive contamination from the proposed blast could adversely affect the health and safety of the local people, whose livelihoods were based on the hunting of animals and other subsistence practices. The investigations noted that radiation from worldwide fallout was moving with unusual efficiency up the food chain in the Arctic, from lichen, to caribou (which fed on lichen), to humans (for whom caribou was a primary food source). Studies also showed that the blasts would thaw the permafrost, making the slopes surrounding the harbor unstable, and negating any experimental value to be gained from using the project as a basis for extrapolation to other, warmer locations. While the AEC publicly touted prevailing winds from the north for dispersing radioactivity over the sea, the AEC privately desired to study landward distribution. The consistent wind patterns would prevent northward fallout patterns over land.

In the meantime, test shots in Nevada provided some data to assist the AEC in modeling excavation scaling and radiation release. The very small 430-ton equivalent Danny Boy test in March 1962 encouraged the AEC to stage the much larger 104-kiloton Sedan test in July 1962. Gerald Johnson, the director of Project Plowshare, described the Sedan test as "an alternative to Chariot" arising from frustration at recommendations for Chariot's cancellation. Fallout from Sedan turned out to be the second-highest of any test in Nevada.

== Plan ==
The project initially envisioned the use of four 100 kiloton devices to excavate a channel, and two one-megaton devices to excavate a turning basin, for a total of 2.4 megatons of explosive equivalent, displacing 70,000,000 short tons (64,000,000 t) of earth. Later iterations reduced the explosive total to 480 kilotons, and subsequently a 280 kiloton test or demonstration.

== Contamination ==
Although the detonation never occurred, the site was radioactively contaminated by an experiment to estimate the effect on water sources of radioactive ejecta, which, landing on tundra plants, might or might not be washed down and carried away by rains. Material from a 1962 nuclear explosion, and other laboratory-produced radionuclides, were transported to the Chariot site in August 1962, used in several experiments, then heaped into a pile and covered with dirt (the permafrost preventing burial). The site comprised a mound of about 400 square feet (37 m^{2}), about 4 feet (120 cm) tall. Thirty years later, the disposal was discovered in archival documents by University of Alaska researcher Dan O'Neill. State officials immediately traveled to the site and found low levels of radioactivity at a depth of two feet (60 cm) in the burial mound. Outraged residents of the Inupiat village of Point Hope, who had experienced an unusually high rate of cancer deaths, demanded the removal of the contaminated soil, which the government did at its expense in 1993.

Small-diameter boreholes drilled to measure soil characteristics were remediated in 2014. The five boreholes, drilled in the early 1960s, had used refrigerated diesel fuel as a drilling fluid, contaminating the surrounding area.

== See also ==
- Project Carryall
- Project Gnome
