= Dan O'Neill (writer) =

American writer

Dan O'Neill (Daniel T. O'Neill) is an Alaskan writer. He is the author of three books of literary nonfiction: The Firecracker Boys (1994), an exposé of the 1958 plan (called Project Chariot) to excavate a harbor in Alaska using nuclear devices; The Last Giant of Beringia (2004), detailing the history of scientific thought about the Bering land bridge and geologist David Hopkin's central role in establishing current theory; and A Land Gone Lonesome (2006), an exploration of the history, prehistory, and culture of the upper Yukon River and its frontier inhabitants. His nonfiction children's book Stubborn Gal (2015) tells the true story of a young woman who wins a 60-mile sled dog race, despite having no experience in the sport. His most recent book, The Impertinent Question: The Words & Adventures of a Liberal Columnist at a Conservative Newspaper in the Red State of Alaska (2025) is a collection of his newspaper columns and essays spanning four decades.

== Early life and education ==
O'Neill was born in 1950 in San Francisco, California. His parents were San Francisco natives; his four grandparents were born in Ireland.

He attended St. Mary's College of California, and graduated from U.C. Berkeley in 1972. That same year, he hitchhiked to Alaska; returning to San Francisco, he worked for two years as a draftsman, land use planner, and environmental planner for Pacific Gas & Electric Company.

In 1975 he moved to Alaska and settled in Fairbanks, where he spent his first winter as caretaker of Chena Hot Springs (now Chena Hot Springs Resort). His early adventures included mushing his own dog team 800 miles to Nome, Alaska, following the trail of the 1925 Nome Serum Run. For a few years he was a self-employed log cabin builder.

== Oral historian ==
From 1984 to 1994, O'Neill was a research associate in the Oral History Program at the University of Alaska Fairbanks. He conducted more than 100 tape-recorded interviews of notable Alaskans, including Alaska Native elders, former Alaska Governor Steve Cowper and his cabinet members, the late Alaska Poet Laureate John Haines, university presidents and chancellors, scientists, business leaders, fishermen/women, bush pilots, steamboat and railroad men, and many others.

In addition to oral histories, O'Neill produced radio and television programming and videos on topics in history, science, and politics.

== Writing career ==
O'Neill turned to writing full time in 1995, but his experience as an oral historian continued to inform and inspire much of his work. For instance, his interviews concerning the Yukon-Charley Rivers National Preserve (digitized at Project Jukebox) formed the basis of his book A Land Gone Lonesome, which was chosen a 2006 "Editor's Choice" by The New York Times Book Review.

In addition to his books, O'Neill has written book chapters, magazine articles, and scholarly articles and reviews. He was an opinion columnist for the Fairbanks Daily News-Miner from 1998 to 2002. Many of those columns are collected in his 2025 book The Impertinent Question.

== Personal ==
O'Neill and Sarah D. Campbell, a biologist and engineer, were married in 1977. They have one child and three grandchildren.

== Honors ==
- 1985, “Best of WEST Award,” Western Educational Society for Telecommunications, for best educational radio series in western US and Canada (for radio production Recorded History—Alaska Transportation).
- 1994, “Outstanding Alaskana Award” (year's best book on Alaska published anywhere), Alaska Library Association, for The Firecracker Boys.
- 1994, “James H. Ducker Historian of the Year,” Alaska Historical Society, for The Firecracker Boys.
- 2004, “Academic Freedom Award,” Alaska Community Colleges’ Federation of Teachers, for his newspaper column and for The Firecracker Boys.
- 2006, The Firecracker Boys selected by the Alaska Historical Society for The Alaska 67: A Guide to Alaska's Best History Books; Hardscratch Press (Anchorage), 2006.
- 2006, “Editor’s Choice,” New York Times Book Review, for A Land Gone Lonesome.
- 2006, “Outstanding Alaskana of the Year Award” (year's best book on Alaska published anywhere), Alaska Library Association for A Land Gone Lonesome.
- 2021, Doctor of Humane Letters (honoris causa), University of Alaska Fairbanks.
- 2023, Citation of honor, Thirty-Third Alaska State Legislature (page 1051).

== List of works ==
=== Books ===
- The Firecracker Boys: H-bombs, Inupiat Eskimos, and the Roots of the Environmental Movement (1994, ISBN 0312134169; 2007, ISBN 0465003486).
- The Last Giant of Beringia: The Mystery of the Bering Land Bridge (2004, ISBN 978-0-465-05157-1).
- A Land Gone Lonesome: An Inland Voyage Along the Yukon River (2006, ISBN 978-1-58243-364-6).
- Stubborn Gal: The True Story of an Undefeated Sled Dog Racer (2015, ISBN 978-1-60223-272-3).
- The Impertinent Question: The Words & Adventures of a Liberal Columnist at a Conservative Newspaper in the Red State of Alaska (2025, ISBN 979-8896922575).

=== Selected articles and book chapters ===
- "Project Chariot: How Alaska Escaped Nuclear Excavation", Bulletin of the Atomic Scientists, 45 (10) 1989: 28–37. ISSN 0096-3402.
- "H-Bombs and Eskimos: The Story of Project Chariot", The Pacific Northwest Quarterly, 85 (1), 1994: 25–34. ISSN 0030-8803.
- "Alaska and the Firecracker Boys: The Story of Project Chariot", in Hevly, Brude W.; Findlay, John M. (eds.), The Atomic West, University of Washington Press, pp. 179–199 (1998, ISBN 978-0-295-98069-0).
- "Coming Out of the Country", in Soos, Frank; Woodward, Kesler (eds.), Under Northern Lights: Writers and Artists View the Alaska Landscape, University of Washington Press, pp. 176–209 (2000, ISBN 978-0-295-97924-3).
- “The Fall of the Yukon Kings”; in Banerjee, Subhankar, (ed.), Arctic Voices: Resistance at the Tipping Point; Seven Stories Press (New York), pp. 142–164. (2012, ISBN 978-1-60980-496-1).
- “The Hunter & the Copper-eyed Bug from Mars: Food Moralists, Meet Alaska,” in Ehrlander, Mary; Soos, Frank, (eds.), The Big, Wild Soul of Terrence Cole, University of Alaska Press (Fairbanks), pp. 225–242 (2019, ISBN 978-1-60223-381-2).

=== Selected video production ===
- Dr. Rudy Krejci: Philosopher & Rebel, 2012, https://www.youtube.com/watch?v=yEajCg3Suts
