= Alfred Eyles =

Sir Alfred Eyles, KCB, KBE (8 December 1856 – 16 May 1945) was a British civil servant at the Admiralty who was Accountant-General of the Navy from 1906 to 1918.

Eyles entered the Admiralty in 1876. He was private secretary to Sir Gerald FitzGerald, Accountant-General of the Navy, in 1885, Staff Officer for Estimates in 1891, Assistant Principal Clerk in 1897, Assistant Accountant-General in 1903, Deputy Accountant-General in 1904, and Accountant-General of the Navy from 1906 to 1918, when he retired.

Eyles was appointed CB in 1908, KCB in 1913 and KBE in 1919.

The writer Leonora Eyles was his daughter-in-law.
