= John Deas Thomson =

British Navy administrator (1763–1838)

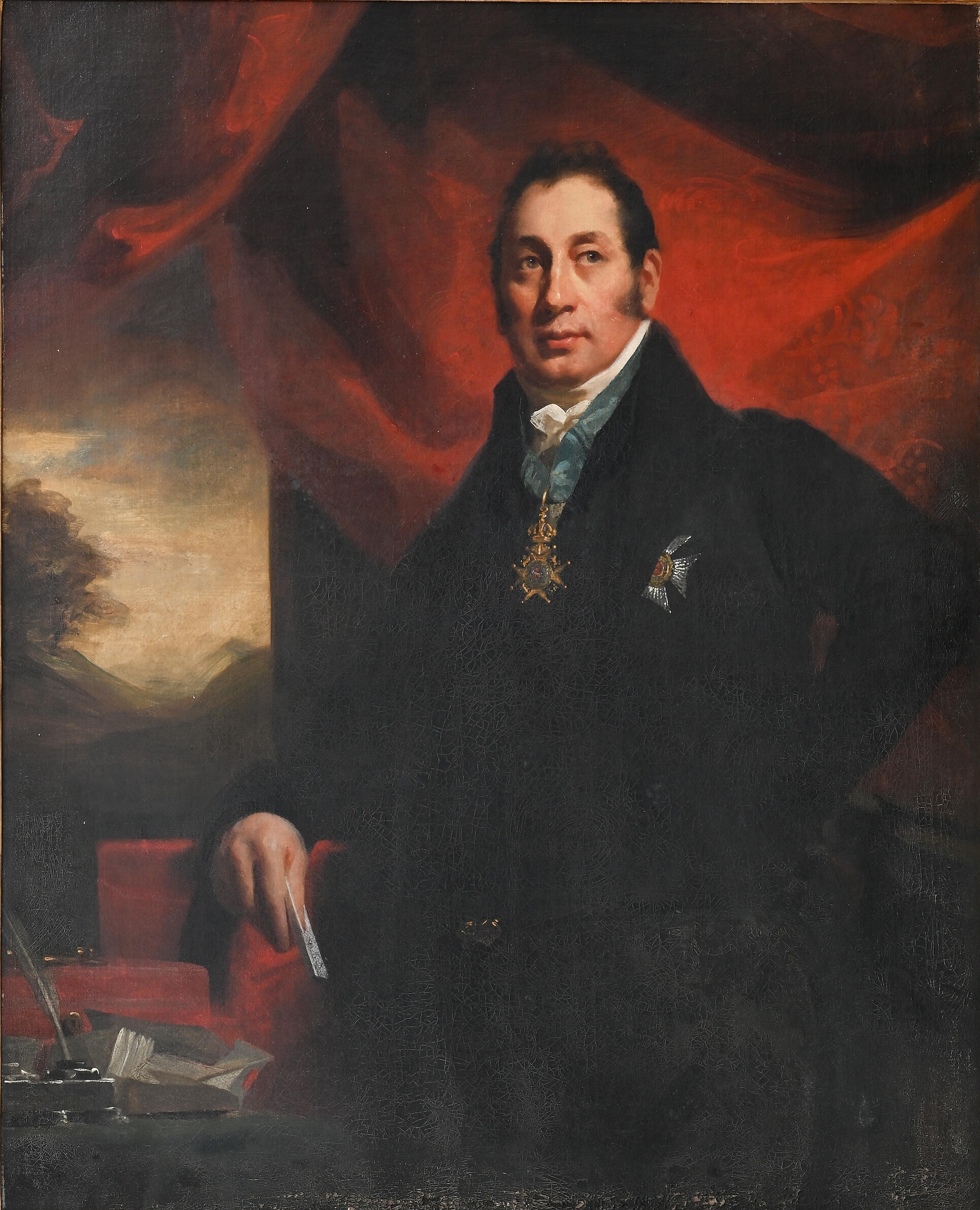
- portrait by Henry Raeburn
- Born: 1763
- Died: 21 February 1838 (aged 74–75)
- Children: Edward Deas Thomson

Sir John Deas Thomson, KCH, FRS, FLS (c.1763 – 21 February 1838) was a British Navy administrator.

He was born in Edinburgh, the son of John Thomson, also a naval administrator. In 1801 he was described as a 'Naval Officer and store-keeper', based in Leith, Scotland. From 1805 to 1829 he was a Navy Commissioner with no special functions in the Navy Office. From May 1805 to May 1806 he was Private Secretary to Charles Middleton, 1st Baron Barham, the First Lord of the Admiralty.

In 1820 he was made a Fellow of the Royal Society. He was also elected a fellow of the Linnean Society.

From 1829 to 1832 he was appointed Accountant-General of the Navy, notably introducing the concept of double-entry bookkeeping to the department. In the latter year he was made a KCH and knighted by the King.

He then served for several years as the naval storekeeper and agent at the Cape of Good Hope dockyard.

He married Rebecca, the daughter of John Freer in South Carolina. They had four sons and a daughter. His son Edward Deas Thomson became an administrator and politician in Australia.

In 1836, he is named as the 2nd claimant for £2925 4s 2d in compensation for the release of 172 enslaved people from the Nichola Town Estate in St Kitts following the abolition of slavery in 1833.

John Deas Thomson died at Farleigh Priory, Maidstone, Kent in 1838.

== Legacy ==
Cape Thompson, a headland on the Chukchi Sea coast of Alaska, was named after him by Captain Frederick William Beechey of the Royal Navy in 1826.
