= Department of the Accountant-General of the Navy =

British government department

Department overview
- Formed: 1829
- Preceding Department: Accountant Department Payment Department
- Dissolved: 1932
- Superseding Department: Department of the Permanent Secretary
- Jurisdiction: Government of the United Kingdom
- Headquarters: Admiralty Building Whitehall London
- Parent Department: Department of the Secretary to the Admiralty

The Department of the Accountant-General of the Navy also known as Accountant-General's Department was the department charged by the British Government with reviewing all naval estimates, conducting naval audits and processing payments from 1829 to 1932.

== History ==
Prior to 1832, the navy did not have a specialist department for accounting purposes. There existed only an office for administering naval widows' pensions that was the domain of the Paymaster for Widows' Pensions. The Accountant-General's Department was established when the Admiralty's civil departments were reorganized and the Navy Board was abolished in 1832. This new department took over the duties of the Navy Boards, Accountants Department and Navy Boards, Payments Department. The Accountant-General of the Navy was initially one of the new Principal Officers of the Board of Admiralty from 1832 until 1869.

In 1866 the accountant and his department became the immediate deputising function to the Parliamentary and Financial Secretary to the Admiralty. It was then given a partial remit over control of naval estimating. The accountant's department, however, had no authority to monitor and track expenditure or estimates of other departments.

In January 1869 the department was restructured with new reporting lines, which gave the Parliamentary Secretary, with the Civil Lord of the Admiralty as his assistant, overall responsibility for Naval Finance. As a result of the re-structuring, the stores accounts functions, for both naval and victualling, overseen by the Storekeeper-General and the Controller of Victualling, were transferred as part of the new responsibilities of the department. The office of the Accountant-General was thus empowered to both review and critique these departments financially. Further enlargement of the department took place in 1876 with traditional responsibilities added. The department continued in this role until 1932 when the office of Accountant-General and his staff were merged into the Department of the Secretary to the Admiralty.

The department consisted of a number of specialist accounting divisions with sub-branches that were administered by the Assistant Accountants-General of the Navy: see each division's responsibilities in the relevant section below.

== Accountant-General's duties ==
Included:

- Ensure that all Naval accounts were examined and supported by the correct documents.
- Ensure that all Naval stores supplied were in conforming within the terms of contract.
- Examination of Naval accounts, the payment of bills, and the recording of expenditure.
- Keeping all books and accounts connected with the receipt and expenditure of the Navy, and including both the Victualling and Marine Services.
- Preparation of all invoices for the payment of claims by the Paymaster-General.
- Review Navy's current expenditure, or the employment of labour and material, as distinguished from cash payments of the dockyards.
- Review Naval proposals for the spending of money on new work or repairs of any kind for which estimates are currently proposed.

== Accountants-General of the Navy ==
Included:

- Sir John Deas Thomson (1829–1832)
- Sir John Thomas Briggs (1832–1854)
- Sir Richard Maddox Bromley KCB (1854–1863)
- James Beebey (1863–1872)
- H.W.R. Walker (1872–1878)
- Sir Robert G. C. Hamilton, (1878–1882)
- Sir William Willis (1882–1885)
- Sir Gerald FitzGerald (1885–1896)
- Sir Richard Davis Awdry KCB (1896–1904)
- Sir Gordon W. Miller CB (1904–1906)
- Sir Alfred Eyles (1906–1918)
- Conrad James Naef (1923, 1931)

== Deputy Accountants-General ==
Incomplete list included:

- B. Woolsey O'Brien, (1844)
- William Willis (1881),
- Follett Pennell (1891)
- Conrad James Naef, (1913, 1918)
- Thomas David James (1920 to 1931)

== Assistant Accountants-General ==
Incomplete list included:

- Thomas David James (1914)

== Structure ==
=== Estimates division ===
Included:

Branch	Responsibility
Estimates and Liabilities Branch	Generally estimates are prepared, after having been compiled and worked out under the immediate responsibility of the heads of the executive departments, who are responsible also for the administration of the several votes.
Ledger Branch	charged with the great work of bringing all expenditure to book under the several votes and sub-heads of votes, and with preparing the all-important Navy Appropriation Account.
Salaries Branch	Responsible for all Officer and Seamen wages, maintains records of all payments made.
Ships Establishment Branch	Keeps and furnishes records of establishments for estimate and other purposes, and prepares certain of the estimates.

=== Navy Pay division ===
Branch	Responsibility
Allotment Branch	Charged with
Full and Half Pay Branch	Charged with all matters relating to the pay of officers, and has its share in the preparation of estimates and returns.
Navy Pension Branch	Charged with administering all Navy Pensions.
Registry Section	Charged with all matters relating to the pay of officers, and has its share in the preparation of estimates and returns. Superintendence of the Central Registry, which records the services, characters, ages, etc., of petty officers and seamen, and conducts other like business; and Superintendence of the Inquiry Office
Seamen's Pay Branch	Exercises all Wages Audit's on ships' ledgers of wages, and deals with the whole business of seamen's wages. There are also a Victualling Audit of payments or allowances in lieu of victualling, subsistence allowances while travelling, and field allowances; and examination of ships' ledgers, with related business.

=== Invoice and Claims division ===
Branch	Responsibility
Banking Branch	Management of the Naval Savings Banks.
Prize Branch	All questions relating to prizes and bounties.
Travel and Subsistence Branch	Charged with processing travelling, and subsistence expenses, and other like matters, with the audit of naval accountants in that regard.
Wills Branch	Deals with the claims and settlement of wills of seamen and marines.

== Attribution ==
Primary source for this article is by * Lovell, Tony; Harley, Simon. "Accountant-General of the Navy". dreadnoughtproject.org. Dreadnought Project.

== Sources ==
- Hamilton, Admiral Sir. Richard. Vesey, G.C.B. (1896). Naval Administration: The Constitution, Character, and Functions of the Board of Admiralty, and of the Civil Departments it Directs. London: George Bell and Sons.
- Lovell, Tony; Harley, Simon. "Accountant-General of the Navy". dreadnoughtproject.org. Dreadnought Project, 14 October, 2104. Retrieved 6 November 2016.
- Haydn, Joseph; Ockerby, Horace (1890). The Book of Dignities; containing Lists of the Official Personages of the British Empire, Civil, Diplomatic,
- Logan, Karen Dale (1976). The Admiralty: Reforms and Re-organization, 1868-1892. Unpublished Ph.D. dissertation. University of Oxford.
- Rodger. N.A.M., (1979) The Admiralty (offices of state), T. Dalton, Lavenham, ISBN 978-0900963940.
- Smith, Gordon (2014), British Admiralty, Part 2 - Changes in Admiralty Departments 1913-1920, Naval-History.Net.
