= Jamie Smith (cartoonist) =

Alaskan artist

Jamie Smith (born circa 1965 in New York) credited as James T. Smith, is an Alaskan painter, printmaker, cartoonist and creator of the comic strips "Freeze-Frame" and "Nuggets".

He received his Bachelor of Fine Art (drawing and printmaking) at the University of Alaska Fairbanks and has completed graduate work in a master's degree in sequential arts from the Savannah College of Art and Design. He has published three "Freeze-Frame" collections, with another "Freeze-Frame" collection as well as a "Nuggets" collection released on Earth Day, April 2008.

Smith has illustrated several books, and his cartoons appear in newspapers and magazines across the state of Alaska. He also produces editorial cartoons for The Ester Republic and the Fairbanks Daily News-Miner. He teaches drawing and cartooning at the University of Alaska Fairbanks.

Before moving to Alaska, Smith graduated from Wm. Nottingham High School in Syracuse, New York, where he received art instruction from Roberta Braen and Charles Wollowitz (2-D and 3-D, respectively).

== Awards ==
- 2007. Alaska Press Club, Best Editorial Cartoon, 2nd place.
- 2006. Alaska Press Club, Best Editorial Cartoon, 1st place.
- 2005. Alaska Press Club, Best Editorial Cartoon, 3rd place.

== Bibliography ==
- freeze-frame. 1993. James T. Smith. Dragon Press.
- How to Speak Alaskan. 1993. Mike Doogan and Jamie Smith. Epicenter Press.
- Beaver Fever. 1995. James T. Smith. Dragon Press.
- Stuck in a Rut. 1999. James T. Smith. Dragon Press.
- Cartoon North: Sequential Art in Alaska. 2007. Jamie Smith and Deirdre Helfferich, editors. Ester Republic Press. (catalog for art show by the same name)
- It's gonna be a long winter. 2008. Jamie Smith. Ester Republic Press.
- Nuggets. 2008. Jamie Smith. Ester Republic Press.

== External links and sources ==
- "Sequential Art." Robinson Duffy. Sun Star, October 14, 2003
- Editorial cartoons. The Ester Republic (archives).
- Freeze-Frame gallery. Fairbanks Daily News-Miner.
- Nuggets gallery. Fairbanks Daily News-Miner.
- "'Nuggets' cartoonist shows true Alaska flavor in new collections", David A. James, book reviews, June 8, 2008, Fairbanks Daily News-Miner.
- ink&snow, cartoonist's blog
