= Leonora Eyles =

English feminist writer (1889–1960)

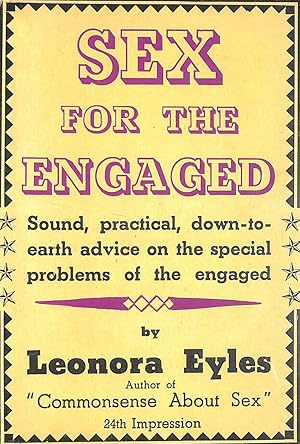
- 1952 publication
- Born: Margaret Leonora Pitcairn; 1 September 1889; Swindon, Wiltshire, England
- Died: 27 July 1960 (aged 70); Hampstead, London, England
- Writing career
- Genre: novel
- Notable work: Captivity

Margaret Leonora Eyles (née Pitcairn, later Murray; 1 September 1889 – 27 July 1960) was an English novelist, feminist and memoirist. Captivity (1922) has been described by critics as "her strongest fictional expression of the chains that bind women, body and soul."

== Early life ==
Eyles was born in Swindon, Wiltshire, as the eldest of the three children of Andrew Tennant Pitcairn (1861–1905) and his wife Rosa, née Bevan (1863 or 1864–1902). The fortunes of her father's Staffordshire pottery were declining. She grew up at Tunstall near Stoke-on-Trent. She was educated at day schools and won a scholarship to stay as a pupil teacher at a local board school when she was 14. After her mother died her father remarried, but he also died three years later, leaving her in the hands of an uncongenial young stepmother.

Having been forbidden at home to take up a place at a teacher training college, she fled to London at the age of 18 and found an ill-paid job addressing envelopes. She then sold some objects left to her by her mother and raised the money to move to Australia as a domestic servant. There she married, in about 1909, the medical student Alfred William Eyles (born 1880), son of Sir Alfred Eyles, and had three children in 1910, 1912 and 1914, the last two in London. However, Eyles left her to bring them up on her own. She lived in Peckham, south-east London, doing ill-paid work, until she gained a post as an appeals writer for the charity Barnardo's.

== Writings ==
Eyles spent the First World War as a munitions worker in Woolwich Arsenal with some 2000 other women. Her deprivations were documented in The Woman in the Little House (1922), which appeared first as a serial in Time and Tide. In 1928, she married a journalist, David Leslie Murray, who edited The Times Literary Supplement in 1938–1944, but she retained the name Eyles for her writings. She became a sought-after trade-union speaker and socialist writer before eventually joining the women's paper Woman's Own as an "agony aunt".

A pacifist, socialist and vegetarian, Eyles also became interested in theosophy, but abandoned her pacifism in the Second World War. Her struggles are clear from her autobiographical work For My Enemy Daughter (1941), addressed to her elder daughter, Vivyan Leonora Eyles (1909–1984), who had remained in Italy with her Italian husband, Mario Praz. Margaret Leonora Eyles's traumatic childhood was recalled in The Ram Escapes (1953).

The books for which she is best remembered attack and suggest ways of averting the social, economic and sexual subjugation of women: Women's Problems of To-Day (1926), Careers for Women (1930), Commonsense about Sex (1933), and Eat Well in War-Time (1940). These were supported also by her "slum" novels: Margaret Protests (1919) contrasts urban deprivation with rural freedom, while exploring the still controversial subject of birth control. Hidden Lives (1922) centres on a female doctor in general practice.

Eyles also wrote some successful crime fiction.

== Death ==
Eyles died on 27 July 1960 at her home in Hampstead, London, at the age of 71. She had been suffering from intestinal problems and diabetes mellitus.

== Partial bibliography ==
Taken from the British Library Special Catalogue. These are first editions, all published in London.

- Margaret Protests (Erskine Macdonald, 1919)
- Hidden Lives (Heinemann, 1922)
- Captivity (Heinemann, 1922)
- The Woman in the Little House, etc. (Grant Richards, 1922)
- The Hare of Heaven (Andrew Melrose, 1923)
- Family Love, etc. (Andrew Melrose, 1923)
- Elfin Gold (Mascot Novels, [1923])
- Women's Problems of To-day (Labour Publishing, 1926)
- Shepherd of Israel (Constable, 1929)
- Feeding the Family. Hints for the intelligent housewife (Cayme Press, 1929)
- Strength of the Spirit (Constable, 1930)
- Careers for Women (Mathews & Marrot, 1930)
- Commonsense about Sex (Gollancz, 1936)
- Death of a Dog (Hutchinson, 1936)
- They Wanted Him Dead! (Hutchinson, 1936)
- No Second Best (Hutchinson, 1939)
- Eat Well in War-Time (Gollancz, 1940)
- For My Enemy Daughter (Gollancz, 1941)
- Cutting the Coat. A book for every housewife in war-time (Hutchinson, 1941)
- Unmarried but Happy (Gollancz, 1947)
- Is Your Problem Here? (Sampson Low, Marston, 1947)
- Sex for the Engaged (Robert Hale, 1952)
- The Ram Escapes. The story of a Victorian childhood (Peter Nevill, 1953)

== Sources ==
- Nicola Beauman: A Very Great Profession (1983) deals at length with Eyles's "treatment of abortion, birth-control, and desire".
