= Richard A. Fineberg =

American journalist (1941–2024)

Richard A. Fineberg (1941–2024) was an independent investigative journalist in Alaska specializing in issues related to petroleum development. As a PhD student at Claremont Graduate School in 1968, he conducted research on the Delano grape strike, ascertaining that grape growers were substituting immigrant and other impoverished labourers for workers who had joined the strike. In 1971, shortly before leaving his post as a political science professor at the University of Alaska Juneau, he joined the Phyllis Cormack expedition by Greenpeace to protest nuclear weapons testing on Amchitka Island. He later said that he viewed testing so close to the border of the Soviet Union as an act of aggression. Subsequently, he became a senior advisor to the Governor of Alaska on oil and gas policy, and consulted for government agencies at the state and federal level.

Born on Sept. 9, 1941, in St. Louis, Missouri, he graduated from Beloit College in 1964 with a bachelor’s degree. Fineberg died on September 27, 2024, at the Pioneer Home in Fairbanks, Alaska.
