= Cape Thompson =

Headland in Alaska, United States

Coordinates: 68°08′38″N 165°58′40″W

Cape Thompson is a headland on the Chukchi Sea coast of Alaska. It is located 26 miles (42 km) to the southeast of Point Hope, Arctic Slope. It is part of the Chukchi Sea unit of Alaska Maritime National Wildlife Refuge.

Early Inuit names for this cape were "Eebrulikgorruk" and "Uivvaq", also spelled "Wevuk" or "Wevok." Cape Thompson was often referred to as "Uivvaq Qanittuq," meaning "near cape," as opposed to "Uivvaq Uŋasiktuq" (Cape Lisburne) meaning "distant cape."

The first recorded Europeans to sight this cape were Russian explorers Mikhail Vasiliev and Gleb Shishmaryov of the Imperial Russian Navy on the ships Otkrietie and Blagonamierennie. Vasiliev and Shishmaryov named this headland Mys Rikord, after admiral Peter Ivanovich Rikord (1776–1855), who was Governor of Kamchatka between 1817 and 1822.

This cape was later renamed by Captain Frederick William Beechey of the Royal Navy, who wrote on August 2, 1826: "We closed with a high cape, which I named after Mr. Deas Thomson, one of the commissioners of the navy."

In 1958 Cape Thompson was the proposed site for an artificial harbor to be dug using hydrogen bombs via Project Chariot.
