= Alaska Library Association =

Professional association for librarians in Alaska

- Nickname: AkLA
- Formation: July 5, 1972; 54 years ago
- Tax ID no.: 23-7129276
- Parent organization: American Library Association
- Website: akla.org

The Alaska Library Association (AkLA) is a professional organization for Alaska's librarians and library workers. It is headquartered in Fairbanks, Alaska. It was founded July 5, 1972, and became a 501(c)(3) nonprofit organization in 1997.

AkLA has two active chapters, one in Anchorage and one in Juneau. AkLA publishes The Newspoke (1981 – present) for news about the association and The Sourdough (1969 – present) which is their professional journal. In addition they maintain a set of Culturally Responsive Guidelines for Alaska Public Libraries to guide libraries in appropriate services to indigenous patrons.

== See also ==
- List of libraries in the United States
