= Gerald W. Johnson (nuclear expert) =

American nuclear expert

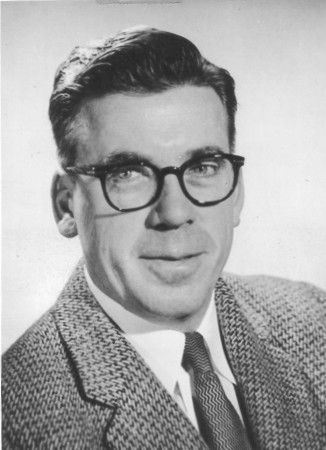
Gerald W. Johnson

Gerald Woodrow Johnson (September 16, 1917 – April 7, 2005) was born in Spangle, Spokane County, Washington. He attended Washington State University where he got his master's degree; earned a PhD in 1947 from the University of California, Berkeley. in the 1950s he oversaw nuclear testing in Nevada and in the Pacific. He became director of Project Plowshare, researching the uses of peaceful nuclear explosions. In the late '70s he was a representative to the Strategic Arms Limitation Talks II and to the Comprehensive Nuclear-Test-Ban Treaty negotiations.

== Writings ==
- Nuclear Weapons Test Bans: a History
