= Bertram de Criol =

Sir Bertram de Criol (Criel, Crioill, Cyroyl, or Kerrial; died 1256) was a senior and trusted Steward and diplomat to King Henry III. He served as Constable and Keeper of Dover Castle, Keeper of the Coast and of the Cinque Ports, Keeper of the receipts, expenses and wardships of the archbishopric of Canterbury, Constable of the Tower of London and Sheriff of Kent.

== Background and origins ==
The historian Nicholas Vincent agrees with the Duchess of Cleveland in deriving the de Criol family from Criel-sur-Mer, Seine-Maritime, though Planché favoured Creil, Oise, and Dunlop offered Creully, Calvados. In Battle Abbey Roll lists the Duchesne recension has the name as "Escriols", the Anglicized "Kyriel" appearing in the earlier Auchinleck manuscript. Criel-sur-Mer is likely, because Robert, younger son of Robert, Count of Eu (d. c 1092), obtained it from his father, whose possession of Criel is shown from a charter to the Abbey of St-Michel du Tréport; in the Domesday Survey, Robert de Cruell held Esseborne (Ashburnham), Sussex, from his kinsman the Count of Eu, governor of the Rape of Hastings, and from these the de Criols and the ancient Ashburnham family are both supposed to descend. "Bartholomew" de Criol witnessed the confirmation charter of Henry, Count of Eu to Battle Abbey before 1140.

Bertram, or Bertrand, de Criol was the eldest son of John de Criol and his wife Margery. John is known principally for a grant of the advowson of Sarre, in Thanet (to Leeds Priory, Kent) in 1194, title to which he had (perhaps by marriage) inherited from Elias de Crevecoeur, (son of that priory's founder), who had previously made a similar grant in 1138, confirmed by his Crevecoeur descendants. He may be the same John de Crioile alias Crihuil who granted to Henry de Cornhill his land and tenement at Wyvermerse (Essex) in c. 1179–82 in the presence of Prince John, Ranulf de Glanville, Hubert Walter, Roger fitzReinfrid and others, a residual claim to which was released to Hugh de Neville after 1216.

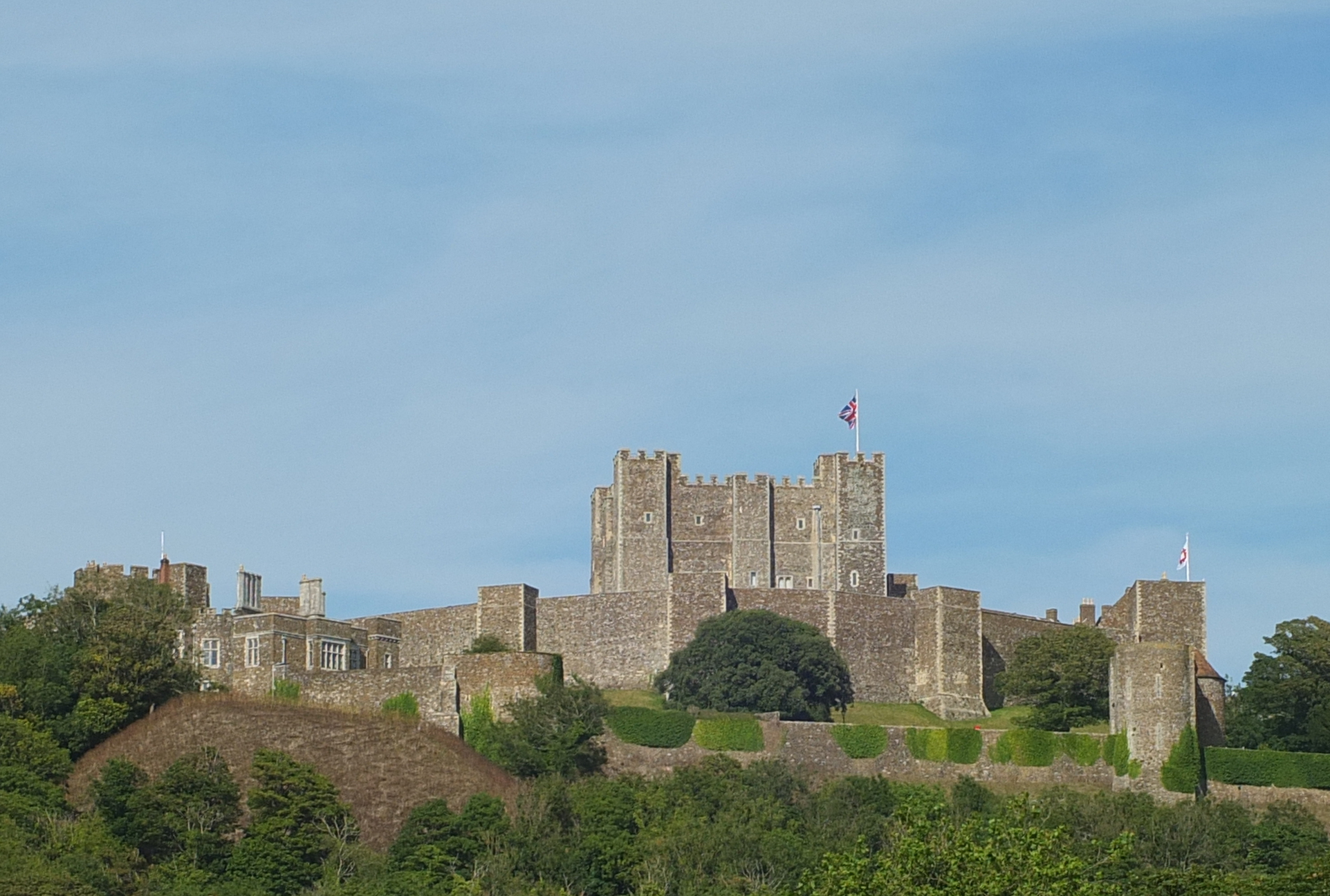
Dover Castle

Whether the identification of Cecilia, wife of Simon d'Avranches (Lord of Folkestone, died c. 1203) as a de Criol is correct, or whether she was the daughter of Simon son of Simon de Brixworth and Beatrice de Fraxineto, is undecided. Bertram de Crioll appears in the scutage for Poitiers in 1214. He has half a knight's fee in Sarre, from the Archbishop, in 1210–1212. Bertram's connection with '"his manor of Sarre" is indicated by a market granted by the king in 1219 and regranted in 1226, for which Bertram de Crioil was to pay a palfrey. "The Salt Water swellith yet up at a Creeke a Myle and more towards a Place called Sarre," says John Leland, "which was the comune Fery when Thanet was full iled."

== Castle politics ==
In 1221 Bertram de Criol, together with Thomas de Blundeville, Osbert Giffard and others, witnessed a charter of Hubert de Burgh, Chief Justiciar of England. granting the church of Portslade, West Sussex, to St. Radegund's Abbey at Bradsole near Dover. In that year Hubert married Margaret of Scotland, and (at King Henry's coming of age) in April 1228 he was granted the castles of Dover, Canterbury, Rochester and Montgomery for life.

De Criol, a member of Hubert's household, became acting constable for him at Dover, where he carried out works in 1229, he and Robert de Auberville, castellan of Hastings and Warden of the ports from Portsmouth to Sandwich, being favoured by a writ de intendendo addressed to the barons of the Cinque Ports. In 1228 the king appointed him, with Alan Puignant, keepers of the vacant archbishopric of Canterbury, to manage revenues, payments and estates. With Stephen de Segrave and Ralph and William Briton, and many of the bishops, he witnessed the grant and confirmation of Hubert's gift of Tunstall, Kent, to the archbishop in 1229.

Shortly before the king's departure on a military expedition to Poitou in the spring of 1230, in which de Burgh accompanied him, an order was issued that Margaret was to be admitted to any of his castles without hindrance, and to have freedom of residence, and access to the wine cellars, at her pleasure. However, in October de Criol, who had been ordered not to let anyone in, stoutly refused to admit her to Dover Castle. As a result, he was dismissed, and in November he was deprived of his wardships by the king's orders, including an estate at Kettleburgh in Suffolk, held in bail for Guy de la Val, and the manor of Moulsford, Berkshire, held during an heir's minority, which was disputed with John Marshall.

De Criol and the king were reconciled in February 1231, and he was rehabilitated under the stricture that he could not plead his cause against de Burgh before the king's court. In ordering the return of Moulsford, the king owned that the disseisin had been "at the king's will", a seeming trespass upon those rights in Magna Carta upon which de Burgh himself had insisted. De Criol was appointed Sheriff of Kent in June 1232: Hubert's fall from grace followed weeks later.

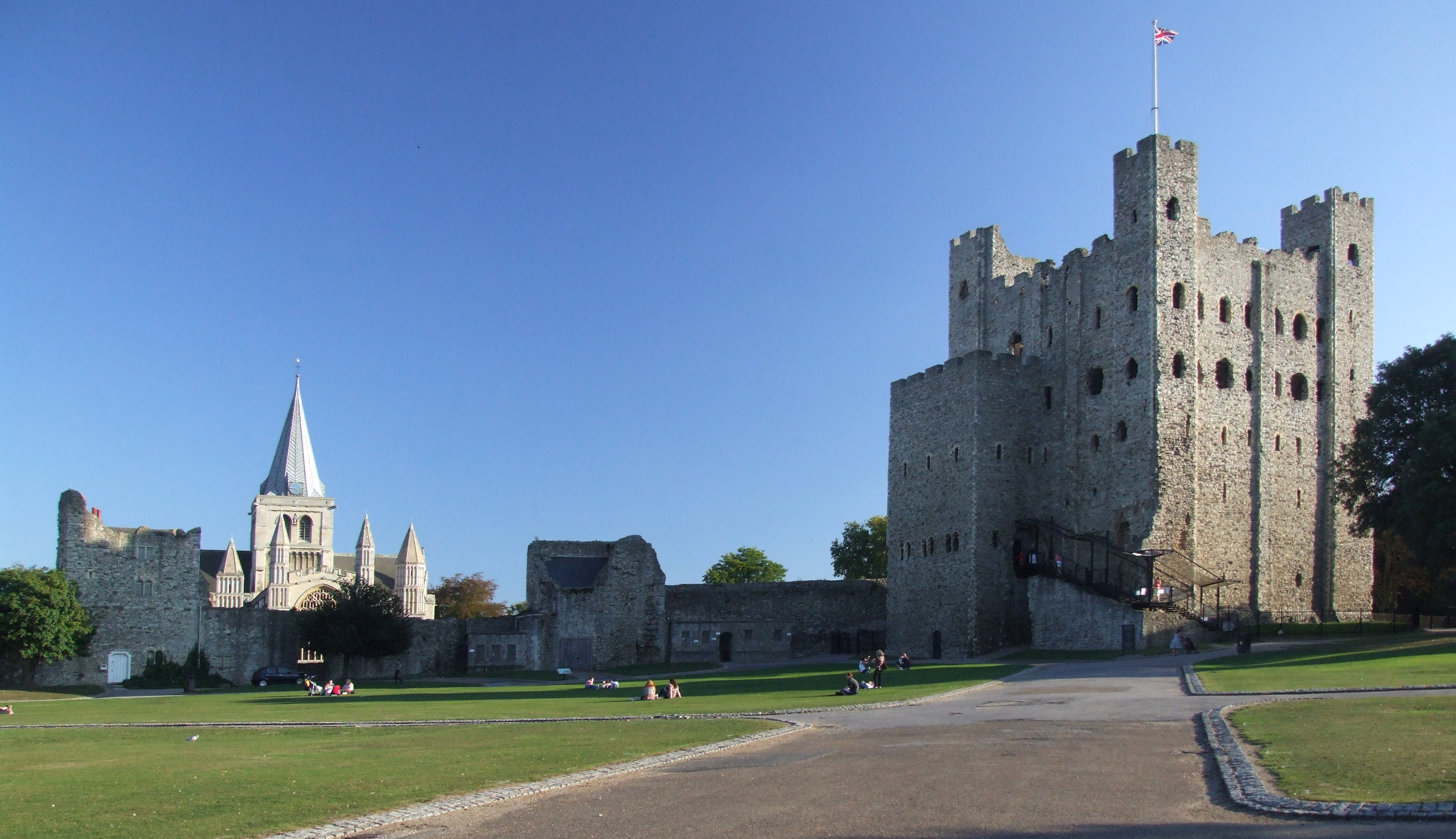
Rochester Castle

In September de Criol had custody of Dover Castle under new auspices. He was at once entrusted with wardship of the lands and heirs of Simon de Chelefeld, a Kentish justiciar, pending their settlement upon Eleanor, Countess of Pembroke in December. Similarly he held Tonbridge Castle for the king until the wardship of Richard de Clare in his minority was settled upon Richard de la Lade in June 1234. His presence is recorded among the principals at Canterbury on 2 April 1234 at the consecration of Edmund Rich as Archbishop.

De Criol was appointed to the custody of the Cinque Ports in May 1236, the year of the King's marriage. Ordered to deliver Rochester Castle to John de Cobham he had to yield the November issues to Cobham for accounting, and, being appointed Sheriff of Kent, he was to find county funds for repair works there. During 1237 his London agent Robert Hurlizun mediated delivery of 20,000 quarrels to him at Dover, and later that year he had two of the king's galleys refitted and housed at Winchelsea. Works continued at Dover in 1238. During the summer his men had custody of a Saracen at Canterbury Castle.

== Constable of the Tower, 1240-1242 ==
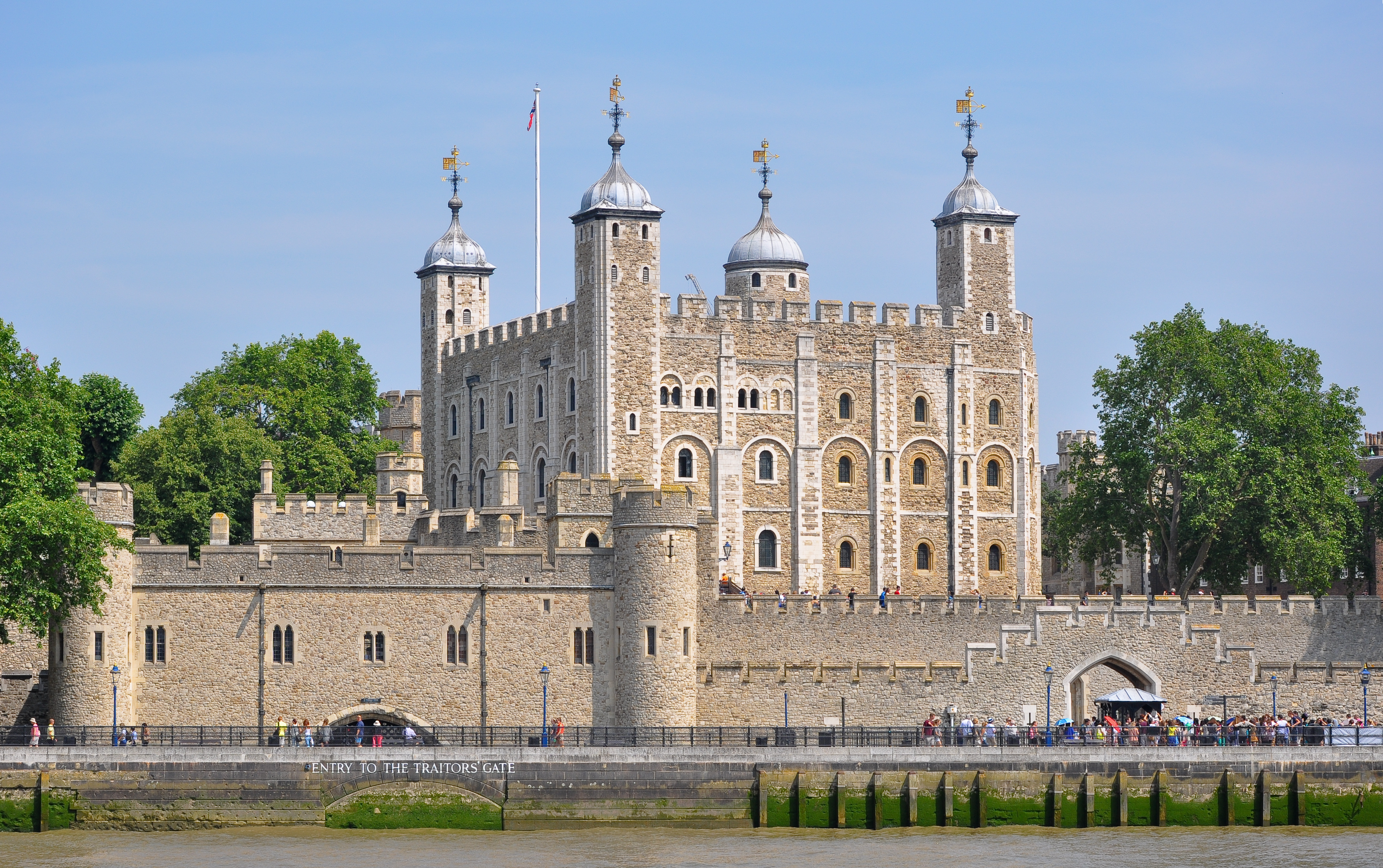
The Tower of London

At Midsummer 1239 de Criol became Sheriff of Essex, answering jointly with Richard de Grey for the second half of the year. On the morrow of St Edmund (21 November) 1239 the king met with his council at Winchester, Stephen de Segrave, brother Geoffrey his Almoner, Bertram de Criol his Seneschal, Master Simon de Steyland, Geoffrey le Despencer and other loyal men, and decreed a reform to moneylending arrangements between the Jews and the Christians of London. In December the king instructed his Treasurer Hugh de Pateshull, Phillip de Assellis and his fellow Justices of the Jews, Peter Grimbald and the Mayor, to send away the present Keepers of the "Archae" (chests, or "arks", in which details of transactions were kept) and their clerks. Instead they, together with the Constable of the Tower of London and two good men chosen by them, should elect two Christian men and two Jews of London to whom the keeping of the Archae should be committed, each to have his own key, and two sworn clerks. Detailed instructions were given for the management and custody of their chirographs, and other matters affecting Jewish residency and practise.

By the beginning of 1240 de Criol was Constable of the Tower of London, and he held the position until the middle of 1242, latterly with the assistance of Walter de Gray. Humphrey de Bohun succeeded him as Sheriff in Kent. In the vacancy following the departure of Edmund Rich, his keeping of the archbishopric was assisted by John Maunsell. The constabulary of the Tower had "rights thereto pertaining to the Jews". Records of the tallage of 20,000 marks upon the Jews of 1241 include de Criol's letter to Jeremiah de Caxton and William Hardel, as Justices of the Jews, concerning remittances to Mosses the son of Josce Crespin the chirographer.

As one of four keepers of the King's Treasure he brought the jewels of Leo de Melcstret to the Wardrobe and delivered large sums to the Treasurer William de Haverhull. In London he was among the dignitaries invited to witness the conveyance by Odo, melter in the king's Exchequer, of his rights to Edward son of Odo the goldsmith, as the grantor prepared to leave for the Holy Land. Late in 1241 he joined distinguished company to witness the king's grant to the Count of Aumale, and in January 1241/42 (at Westminster) witnessed the King's renewal of franchise to the city of Cork. De Criol was granted a fee in Everlond (Overland, in Elham, Kent, close to a royal park) which was forfeited by Master Simon de Steyland the king's clerk: and this de Criol's heir still retained in 1253.

== War with France, 1242 ==
In March 1242, in view of the king's French expedition, de Criol was re-appointed Sheriff of Kent and Constable of the castles of Dover and Rochester, and in April was ordered to hold Dover and to surrender it to no-one but the king himself, or (if the king should die) then to Eleanor the queen, or to one of her Savoy uncles not in the fealty of the King of France. The extent of de Criol's tenures of knight's fees in Kent at this date, and their fee-lords, can be read in the Testa de Nevill.

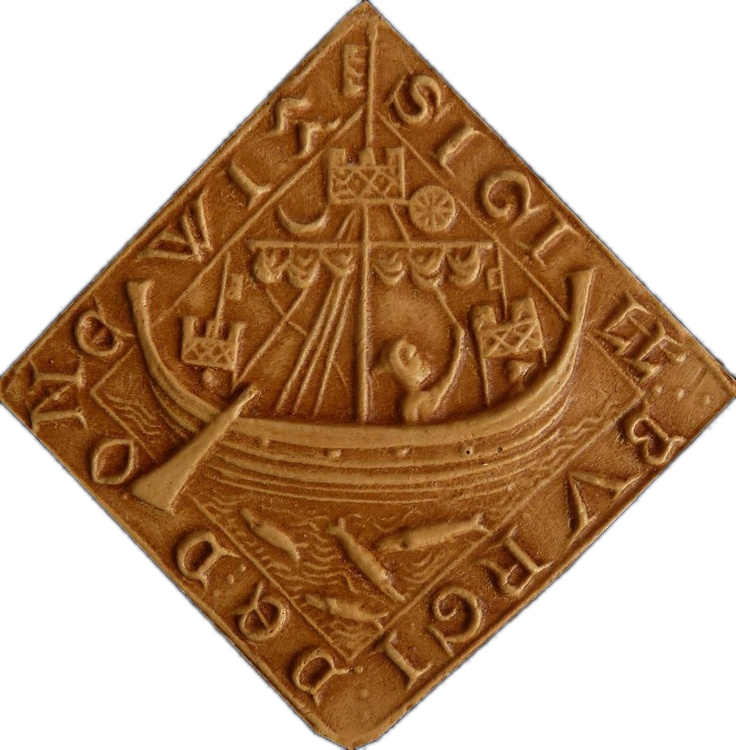
The town seal of Dunwich, granted 1199

In April de Criol was to test all the crossbows or ballistas at Dover and in the Tower for reliability. The Cinque Port barons were made intendant to de Criol as Constable at Dover. Custody of the archbishopric was granted to him jointly with Jeremiah de Caxton, de Criol himself freely taking responsibility before king and council for rendering accounts. He and Chancellor Ralph Neville surveyed the coast and arranged with the barons (including New Romney) for the defence of their ports.

He was to build four swift barges for the king, and to receive two galleys at Winchelsea sent from Bristol. The Lord Mayor of London was to send him 120 crossbowmen, and liveries were sent. Ships, crews and all the crossbowmen they had were summoned to him at Dover, five each from the bailiffs of Dunwich and Great Yarmouth, and four from Ipswich, Orford and Blakeney. Richard fitzReginald and Fulco fitzWarin were to follow his orders on land and sea, and to be ready at Winchester on 22 August. De Criol was not to impede the merchants of Brabant or of the Count of Flanders, but to take whatever provisions he could from the assets of the French king and of Henry Puchepap of Rye. Ten Winchelsea ships and a galley were to be sent to the king at Portsmouth, and then twenty from the Cinque Ports for the soldiers. In August he took securities from the Viscount de Beaumont, going into Scotland, against the possibility of betrayal. He delivered £100 to the barons of Winchelsea for their maintenance in the war.

De Criol and his clerk Henry de Wengham took in the king's share of booty brought from France to the Cinque Ports, Nicholas de Hadlo assisting, with authority over the port barons. He had to rectify many claims from Flanders and elsewhere for the return of wool and wine wrongly seized. He was to hear the complaints against men of Winchelsea at Shipwey, "the place that was of auncient time honested with the Plees and assemblies of the Five Portes." He brought Henry Puchepap to trial for receiving goods plundered from Flemish merchants. Security in his ports, and transport to and from France, emissary or mercantile, was strictly under his view by royal warrant. In the following February the barons of Winchelsea and the Cinque Ports were, with de Criol's counsel, "to furnish all the galleys they can to grieve the king's enemies by sea and land so long as the war lasts with France."

=== Croxton Kerrial, 1242 ===
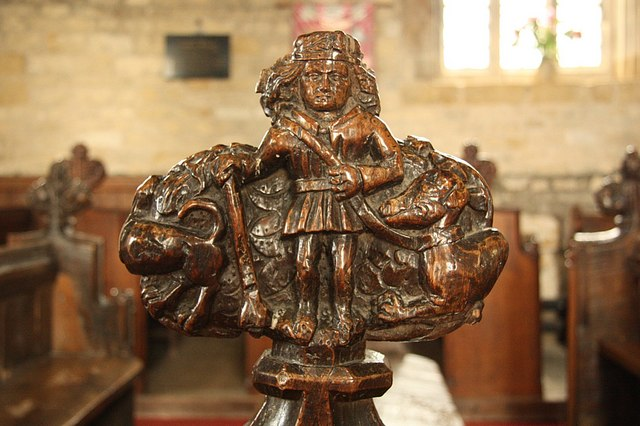
Pew carving at Croxton popularly thought to represent Nicholas de Crioll

In May 1242 the King granted to de Criol and to his heirs the manor of Croxton (Croxton Kerrial, Leicestershire, named from this family) in part exchange for Kettleburgh (near Framlingham Castle), the formerly sequestrated manor. To this were added lands in the manor of Lechton, Sussex (probably Laughton), held by the king in bail from the Queen's uncle Peter II, Count of Savoy, to be held in interim by Bertram for the service of a pair of white gloves. Croxton manor had formerly been a possession of Hubert de Burgh's: the nearby Premonstratensian abbey of Croxton received repeated gifts from Henry, because the heart of his father King John was buried in the church of St John the Evangelist there. By 1246 Croxton manor had passed to Bertram's kinsman Nicholas de Crioll, who was granted a market and fair. But the heirs of Hamo de Valoignes, whom de Criol had in charge, he delivered to William de Cantilupe, to whom their marriages were granted.

== Works and duties ==
An adjustment to scutage for Bertram and his sons was extended to John and Simon de Criol and to Nicholas de Hadlou. He received orders in April 1243 to prevent the embarcation of the Master of the Knights Templar in England to answer the summons of the Grand Master to Jerusalem. Four silver bowls were sent for him to place before the shrine of St Thomas at Canterbury.

Preparations for the marriage of Richard, Earl of Cornwall to the queen's sister Sanchia in November 1243 involved de Criol and Caxton in many duties. The hire of ships, boats and galleys, the wages of mariners and serjeants, etc., for the transport of Beatrice Countess of Provence, Sanchia, and their household, and the conveyance of wine from Sandwich to Dover and Canterbury were met from the Canterbury issues. A great sum was expended on candles for the Canterbury churches for the arrival of the Countess, and the keepers had the cost of her journey home. In December 1243 de Criol witnessed the covenant made between the King and Earl Richard. Payments were made for the carriage of many fowl and swans to the king's kitchen at Westminster, and for the king's huntsmen, over the next months.

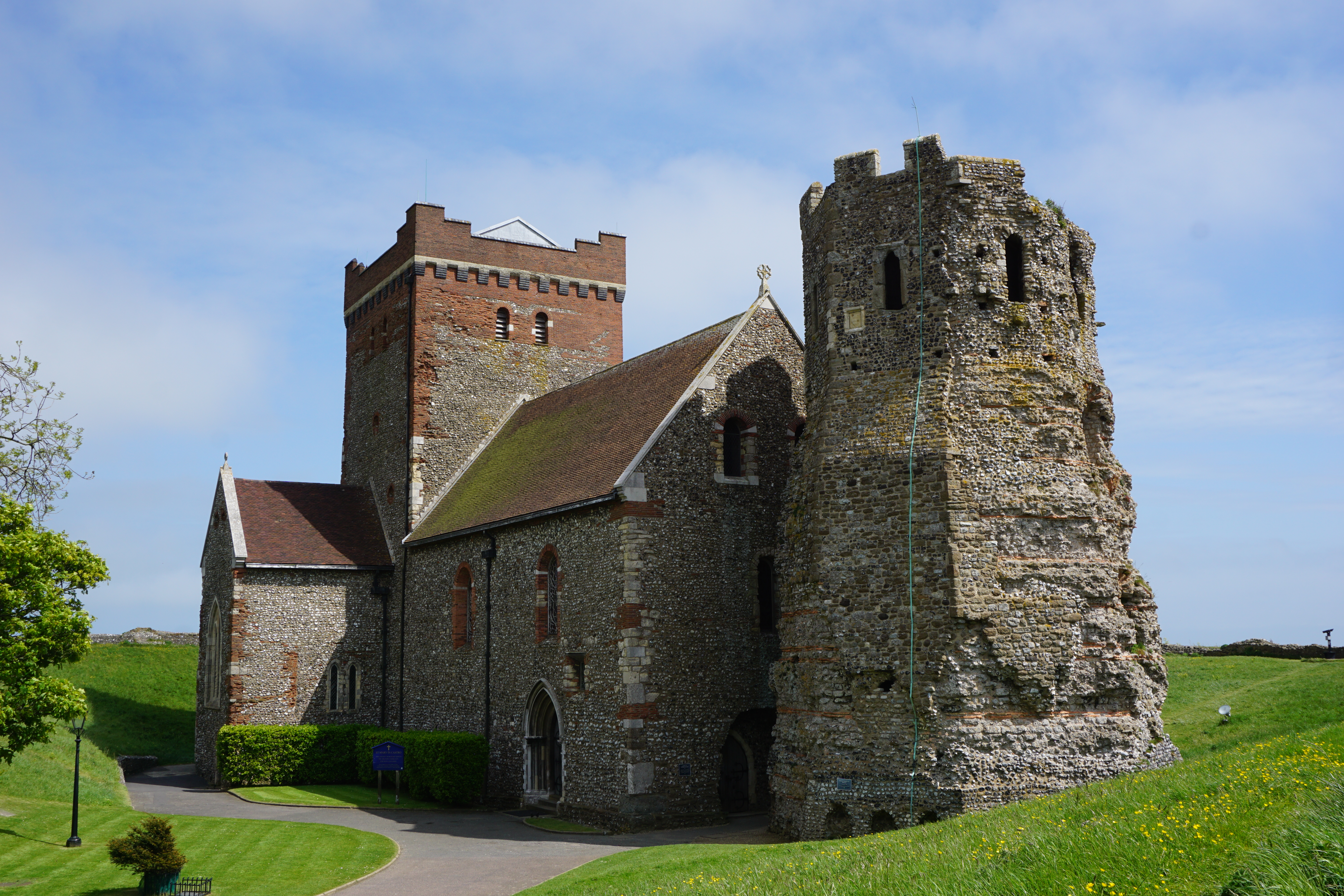
St Mary in Castro church and Roman lighthouse in Dover Castle

Responsibility for Kentish works fell to the Sheriff during 1244, especially for a building to contain the king's engines at Dover, for the repair or rebuilding of houses for the king's galleys at Rye, and for the installation at Dover of the catapult, trebuchet and ram, but all under the supervision of de Criol as Constable. De Criol and Caxton saw to the repair of the gate buildings at Canterbury Castle. He was occupied with the king's interdictions: during the spring of 1244 armed Scotsmen were to be sought out and arrested, and merchant ships in the ports were not permitted to sail. A year later, religious persons of any kind arriving were to be held and searched for letters, and not permitted to proceed without the king's approval. In May 1246 he was to appoint custodians in every port to prevent English coin being taken out, and no ship, or anything from which a ship could be made, was to be sold to anyone in fealty to the King of France. He completed repairs to the walls at Rye and Winchelsea, and received contributions for his court at Shipway.

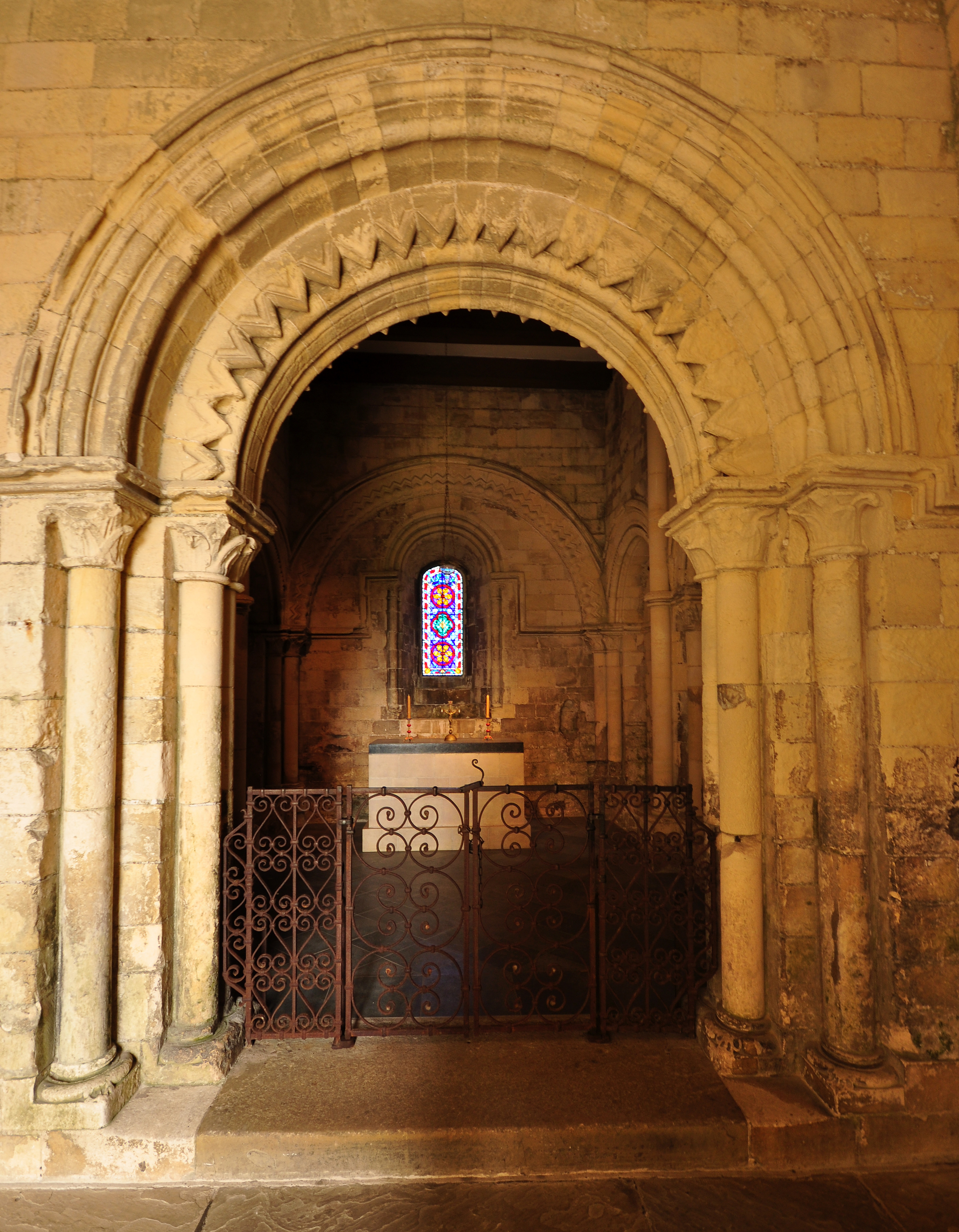
One of the chapels in Dover Castle

Meanwhile, the king sent gifts of bucks from the park at Elham, and Nicholas de Croill, royal groom ("vadlettus"), was sent hunting for them. Bertram received a goshawk from Hubert de Rewley, the king's fine for a market at Cattawade, by Orwell Haven. Liveried chaplains were appointed for divine service at Dover Castle in 1246, and in 1247 three silver chalices, a censer, and quantities of orphrey, samite and other precious cloths for making chasubles and dalmatics for the Castle chapels, including the pre-conquest church of St Mary in Castro, were supplied to de Criol. The King was then engaged in his new works at Westminster Abbey, and was soon to proclaim the Relic of the Holy Blood. Dover Castle's best hospitality, at the King's expense, was required for Baldwin II, Emperor of Constantinople, on his journey home in April 1247, but the Constable was to pay his whole passage. In August he was to prepare a good ship at Sandwich equipped for horses and men to be the king's messengers on a secret errand.

De Criol delivered the castles of Rochester and Canterbury to Nicholas de Ores, Sheriff of Kent, in November 1248. At Easter 1249 he, with two other knights, was sent to the Duchy of Gascony for four months on the king's service, being required to deliver £1000 by weight to Simon de Montfort, its viceroy. Nicholas de Crioll was in Gascony with him for the same period. He made arrangements for the transport of Earl Richard "and others of the king's faithful men on his errand over seas", and for two voyages of John de Newburgh (the king's chaplain) as king's messenger, in the following year.

In February 1251 a delegate for the bailiwick of the Cinque Ports was required of him to join the sheriffs in their commission into money counterfeiting and false exchange. Great were the arrangements of August and September 1252, when the port barons were to make ready 60 ships to cross from Portsmouth in the first week of October. As the crisis in Gascony came to a head, de Criol witnessed the King's mandate requiring support for a truce among that people, instructing them not to obey Simon de Montfort if he oppose it. After witnessing special privileges granted to William of Kilkenny, soon to be the king's Chancellor, in the summer of 1253 he was to prevent any count, baron or magnate leaving for France without royal licence. On 2 October Queen Eleanor and Earl Richard sent orders requiring him to oversee in person the preparation at Winchelsea and Rye of two ships and crews, armed with crossbowmen, to carry the king and his treasure ("thesaurus") to Gascony from Portsmouth 11 days later.

== Services and rewards ==
Meanwhile, he was granted further wardship of the Bendenges estates, and rights to a market and annual fair at his manors of Monigeham and Shoueldon, Kent, and at his manor of Poppeshall (Buckland, Kent), with free warren there and in Cherry Hinton, Cambridgeshire (which he had acquired by exchange with Peter of Savoy) in September 1252. In June 1252 he witnessed the King's Letters Patent of Incorporation to Faversham, and in August his confirmation charter to Bristol. He was made King's Justice to receive William Pundelarche, an outlaw, into the king's peace, and with his son Simon and kinsman Nicholas he witnessed the resultant grant to William de Valencia. He was not, however, to permit the Earl of Pembroke to make any embarcation. He was granted wardship and marriage of Helen and Isabel, daughters of Maud de Avranches, one of whom married his grandson.

Seizures of ships, imprisonments of men, manslaughter, and other claims of damages and injuries arose between the barons of Winchelsea and the men of Yarmouth, and he was called upon to summon the barons and bailiffs in February 1253. Meanwhile, the king deferred settlement of the long arrearages owed to Dover Castle by Robert de Nevill, but always looked to de Criol to ensure the regular delivery of his Gascon wines from Sandwich to Westminster. In June 1253, with the king's councillors, he witnessed Henry's charters of confirmation and free warren to Battle Abbey, and his inspeximus charter to the Weavers' Guild of London, and in July to the burgesses of Reading. As from Portsmouth, he issued a grant to the sons of Jocelin de Oye (sometime King's Serjeant, and one of the keepers of the King's Works) to be conferred by the Queen and Earl Richard.

De Criol himself received a grant of 640 marks a year for the keeping of Dover Castle, so long as he be its keeper, over and above the castle guard rents, the issues and tolls of the town of Dover already granted. He was therewith notified that, in case of the King's death, the castle should not be given into the charge of Prince Edward during his minority without Queen Eleanor's assent. In February 1255 there remained £406 8s 11d owing to him of his annual payment of £426. 13s 4d, for the keeping of Dover Castle for the Easter and Michaelmas terms of the previous year. In settlement he received 227 quarters of wheat, 425 quarters of barley, 75 quarters of oats, 125 tuns of wine and 500 lbs. of wax out of the castle's munition stock, as appraised by the barons of the Exchequer. In March he was called to supervise the clearing and felling of old oaks and chestnuts for timber in Kent and the Weald, for sale on the king's behalf.

Upon the arrival of Eleanor of Castile at Dover in 1255, Henry sent orders that she should at once celebrate the feast of St Edward (13 October) at Canterbury, which de Criol and three others were to provide and superintend. At this time his sons John and Simon de Criol were also in duty to Dover Castle. The king did not forget his gifts, and in July 1253, granting six bucks for de Criol and four hinds for his wife, he thoughtfully instructed the park keeper to give him advice and help in catching them. The family origin of Emma de Criol, Bertram's wife, is undecided.

== A diplomatic mission, and death ==
In January 1256, he was granted

"Power to John Mansell, Provost of Beverley, and Bertram de Crioyl to make, extend and confirm a truce between the king of France and his brothers and their adherents, and the king, Edward the king's son, the king's brothers and their adherents, from the feast of St. Rémy (13 January), when the truce made between the king of France and the king by Simon de Monte Forti, earl of Leicester and Peter de Sabaudia, for three years more after this date ends; with power to them to swear on the king's soul that he will observe it."

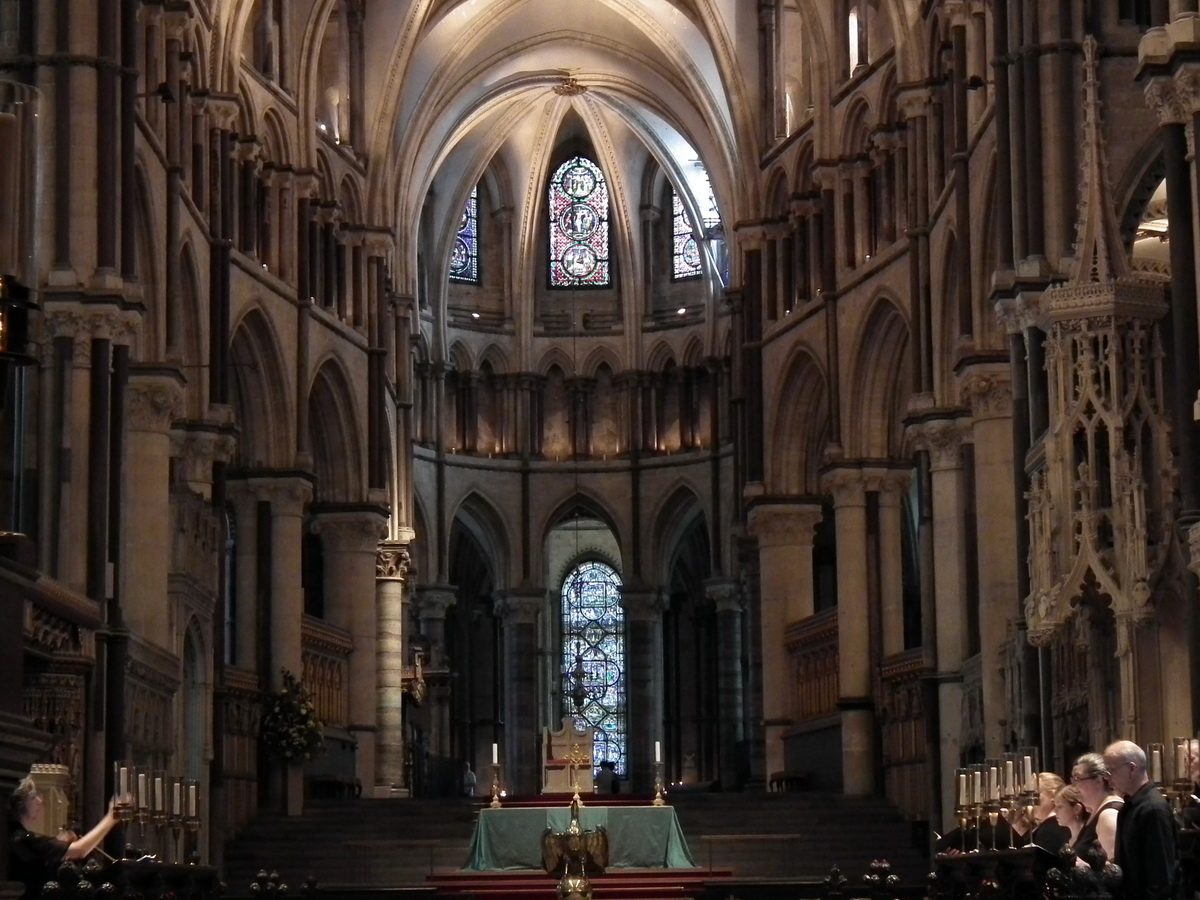
13th century architecture in Canterbury Cathedral

Within six months, by June 1256, he had died. A Pardon was granted to his heirs and executors, "in consideration of their having remitted to the king all his debts to the said Bertram, of all the said Bertram's debts to the king; and also of all accounts and reckonings for all receipts and expenses and wardships of the archbishopric of Canterbury, the castle of Dover, and the county of Kent for the whole time that he had the keeping thereof, by the order of the king; and of all other wardships and bailiwicks which he held of the king from the time that he was in the king's service until the time of his death: so that his executors may have free administration of his goods." And since John Maunsell, king's clerk, was for some time attendant to the keeping of the archbishopric with the said Bertram, without whom he could not make due reckoning of the debts and issues for that period of time, the king released John of all reckonings and demands that might be made in that regard. A similar remission was made to Stephen de Bokland, de Criol's clerk.

De Criol was a most important figure in King Henry's rule, and appears to have held loyally to him throughout. The records of payments of his salary are numerous in the Rolls, often expressing that they must be paid immediately. His son or near kinsman Nicholas de Crioll was for a time Constable of Dover Castle during the early 1260s. The burial place may have been in Battle Abbey, or possibly in the Premonstratensian abbey of St Radegund at Bradsole, near Dover, an Order of which the de Aubervilles and de Criols were patrons. John Leland remarked, "Certen of the Crealles were honorably biried at S. Radegund. Creaulles were greate benefactors to Houses of Religion in Est Kent, as appereth by their Armes in many Glase-Windois." De Criols bore "Or two chevrons and a canton gules", rendered in a 13th-century source as "Bertram de Criol, d'or ove deux chevrons et ung quartier de goules".

Matthew Paris provides an epitaph:

"Et circa dies illos obiit dominus Bertrammus de Criol, domini regis dapifer et Doveriae opidanus et custos fidelissimus."
(And in those days died lord Bertram de Criol, steward of the lord king and most faithful citizen and keeper of Dover.)

== Family ==
Bertram de Criol had two identified sons:

- Sir John de Criol, "son and heir". John married in or before 1233 to Matilde de Eastwelle (died 1267), whose mother Margeria was living at the time of her death. In 1258 John received royal letters of protection for his intended journey to Santiago (in Galicia). Richard de Clare is said to have died at John's manor of Ashenfield (Hesmeresfeld) at Waltham in 1262. Sir John died in 1264. They were the parents of
  - Sir Bertram de Criol, who did homage for his father's lands in 1264, and was heir to his mother in 1267. He married Alianora, one of the four daughters and co-heirs of Hamo de Crevecoeur and Matilda (Maud) de Avranches. Sir Bertram died in 1295. Their children included
    - John de Criol (born c.1261), who was aged 34 in 1295: died without issue before 1302.
    - Bertram de Criol: died without issue in 1306.
    - Joan de Crioll, who married Sir Richard de Rokesley. They sold the manor of Aldbury in 1309.
- Sir Simon de Criol. Simon married Matilda, daughter and heir of William de Esseteford (of Ashford, Esturt and Packmanstone in Newchurch). In 1252 he was granted immunity from coroner, assize or jury service for life, but in 1258 he was one of four knights selected for Kent for the bringing of inquisitions into trespasses and damages. Matilda was living at her husband's death in 1267.
  - Simon and Matilda had eight sons, who in 1267 were aged 30, 24, 23, 20, 16, 14, 12 and 11. These sons had an inheritance partible by gavelkind.

In 1245/6 Sir John and Sir Simon were together jurors in the inquisition post mortem upon Thomas de Normanville, lord of Kennington, Kent, which constituted part of the barony of the constabularie of Dover.

- The relationship of Nicholas de Crioll (fl. 1240–1272) to Bertram is not specified. He is not mentioned in the 1243 scutage payment, where he would be expected. By 1246 Nicholas held the manor of Croxton Kerrial in Leicestershire granted to Bertram and his heirs by King Henry in 1242. Nicholas also became Constable of Dover Castle and Keeper of the Coast. He married Joan de Auberville, daughter of William de Auberville the younger, whose grandfather William the elder was married to Matilda (Maud), one of the three daughters of Ranulf de Glanville. Nicholas witnessed the De Clare and Puntdelarche charters in company with Simon de Criol, and obtained from the king a remission of £12 owing on the estate of John de Criol when John's son Bertram inherited it in 1264. He remarried to Margery, believed to have been daughter of Simon de Cray, who survived until 1319 and remarried into the Clifford family. His son by Joan,
  - Nicholas de Crioll, married Margaret, daughter of Galfred Pecche.

== See also ==
- De Criol

Honorary titles
Preceded by Walerland Teutonicus	Lord Warden of the Cinque Ports; 1236	Succeeded by Henry Hoese
