= Robert de Auberville =

13th-century English noble

Robert de Auberville (de Albervilla, in Latin), of Iham (Higham, in Icklesham) and Iden, Sussex, representative of a wealthy Norman family in Kent and Sussex, was a Justiciar in Kent, Constable of Hastings Castle, and Keeper of the Coast to King Henry III of England.

== Origins ==
The de Auberville family was seated at Westenhanger, near Stanford, Kent. William de Auberville the elder, King's Justiciar (son of Hugh de Auberville (the elder) and his wife Wynanc), married Matilda (Maud), eldest daughter of Ranulf de Glanville (Chief Justiciar of England to King Henry II) and his wife Bertha de Valoines. (Bertha's sister was the wife of Hervey Walter, and mother of Archbishop Hubert Walter.)

William de Auberville (the elder) was associated with the foundation or patronage of various religious houses including the Augustinian Canons Regular of Butley Abbey (1171) and the Premonstratensians of Leiston Abbey (1182) in Suffolk, both founded by Ranulf, and by his own founding, c. 1192, of West Langdon Abbey in Kent, as from Leiston Abbey, assisted by the priors of both Suffolk houses. The Langdon foundation was confirmed by Simon de Averenches, Lord of Folkestone (died c. 1203) who, as his fee-lord, refers to "the charter of my revered knight William de Auberville". William died c. 1195, and his heirs became wards of Hubert Walter.

William's principal heir was his son Hugh (the younger), who inherited from him, but there was also a son William and a daughter Emma. Hugh de Auberville the younger, together with Robert his brother, were c. 1199-1205 witnesses to a charter of John of Eu, a son of John, Count of Eu, confirming to the Cistercian abbey of Robertsbridge in Sussex their tenements, liberties and customs in his fee of the Rape of Hastings. Hugh died c. 1212, whereupon William Briwere paid 1000 marks for custody of his lands, his heirs and their marriages. The inheritance descended through Hugh's son William de Auberville the younger (died by 1248) to William's daughter Joan, who married Nicholas de Crioll.

Robert de Auberville maintained connections with Robertsbridge Abbey, married the heiress of another of its patron families, and became settled at the western edge of Romney Marsh. Robertsbridge was originally founded in 1176 in the parish of Salehurst by Alvred de St. Martin, Sheriff of the Rape of Hastings, whose wife was Alice d'Aubigny, widow of John, Count of Eu.

== Marriage ==
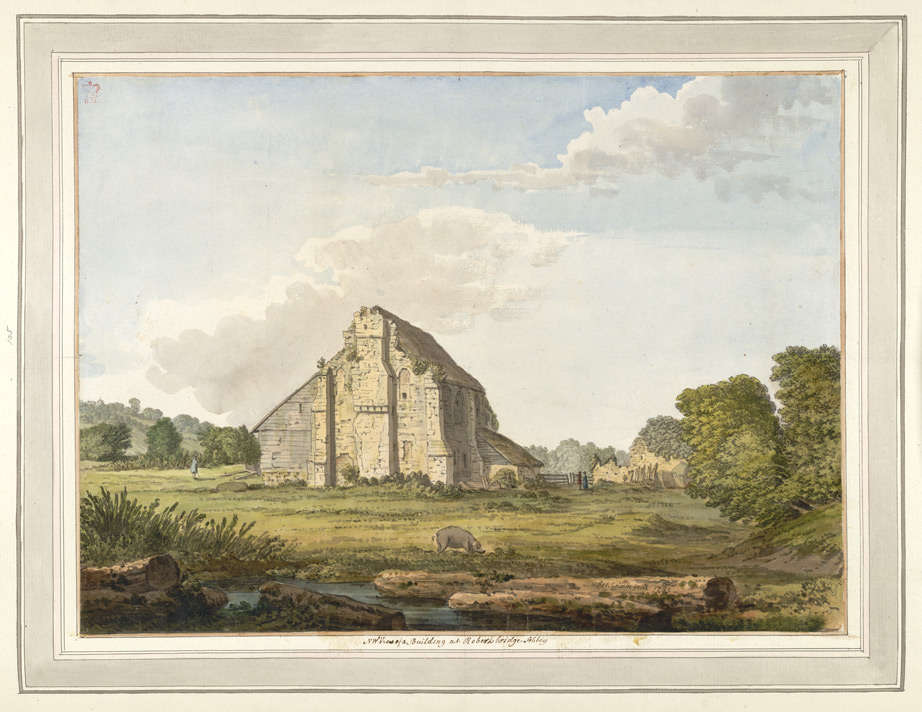
Robertsbridge Abbey in 1783

The Sheriff of Sussex was ordered to effect full seisin of the land of "Ihōme" and Iden in eastern Sussex to Robert de Auberville, in the right of his wife Claricia, which had been in the keeping of Hubert Walter, in July 1205. Claricia is identified as a daughter of Robert de Gosteling on the basis of a deed of quitclaim made by her to the priory of Christ Church, Canterbury of lands in the vicinity of Fairfield, Snave and Appledore, on the west side of Romney Marsh, near Iden. This shows her as the wife of Robert de Auberville, who has enclosed 36 acres from the sea. A further reference to her in the Curia Regis rolls shows that Claricia was the granddaughter of Samson de Gestling.

Samson and Robert de Gosteling appear frequently as witnesses to the Robertsbridge Abbey deeds. William de Auberville, as justiciar, presided at an early transaction, and Hugh, alone, at another. Robert witnessed three other Robertsbridge charters in the Lisle muniments. Sussex Fines of 1219 reflect the dealings of Robert and Claricia with the Abbey respecting lands at Northiam, Pett and Playden.

== Rebellions ==
In 1210 King John took a large army to Ireland in order to suppress a revolt by the Anglo-Norman lords whom he held there in governance. Robert de Auberville fought in Ireland in that year, and Hugh is named in the same entry.

In 1215, following the sealing of Magna Carta at Runnymede, Robert de Auberville was with William d'Aubigny, William de Averenches, Reginald de Cornhill (the High Sheriff of Kent), Thomas de Moletun, Osbert Giffard and a hundred others who held Rochester Castle against King John, until he besieged them there and they were captured. At this time Cecilia, widow of Simon de Averenches, sold her manor of Sutton next Seaford to Robertsbridge, in order to ransom her son William.

Robert was however loyal to Henry III at the time of the revolt stirred up by William de Fortibus, Earl of Aumale, and in 1221, having been listed for the general levy of scutage, he was with the young king at the siege of the Earl's castle at Bytham in Lincolnshire in February and March of that year. After the castle was fired a number of prisoners were taken, and on 15 March the order was given that he and Paul de Tayden should have charge of conducting them in their carts to London.

De Auberville was entrusted with a surety for the king by Rosamond, widow of Phillip de Girunde, for a fine of 20 marks to enable her to marry whom she pleased. In November 1222 the king paid him to buy horses for the use of Isabella, sister of Alexander II of Scotland when coming into his district. In August 1223 his name was listed to defend the king as far as Bedford.

In 1222 Robert appears among the witnesses to a charter, issued at Westminster, by William, son of Fulco, de Pamele in favour of Saint Peter's Abbey, Ghent.

== Assizes ==
In 1226 Robert de Auberville and Henry de Sandwich were chosen by the king to replace justiciars in an assize in Canterbury. He sat in an assize in Rochester with justices William de Cyriton, Simon de Chelefeld and Simon de Craye in 1228, and in 1229, with Henry de Cobham, William de Dudinton and Robert de Rokeley, at Greenwich (an assize of Mort d'Ancestor) with Henry de Sandwich, and at Winchelsea with Simon de Echyngham, William de Munceiaus and William de Oym.

== Keeper of the Coast and Constable of Hastings ==
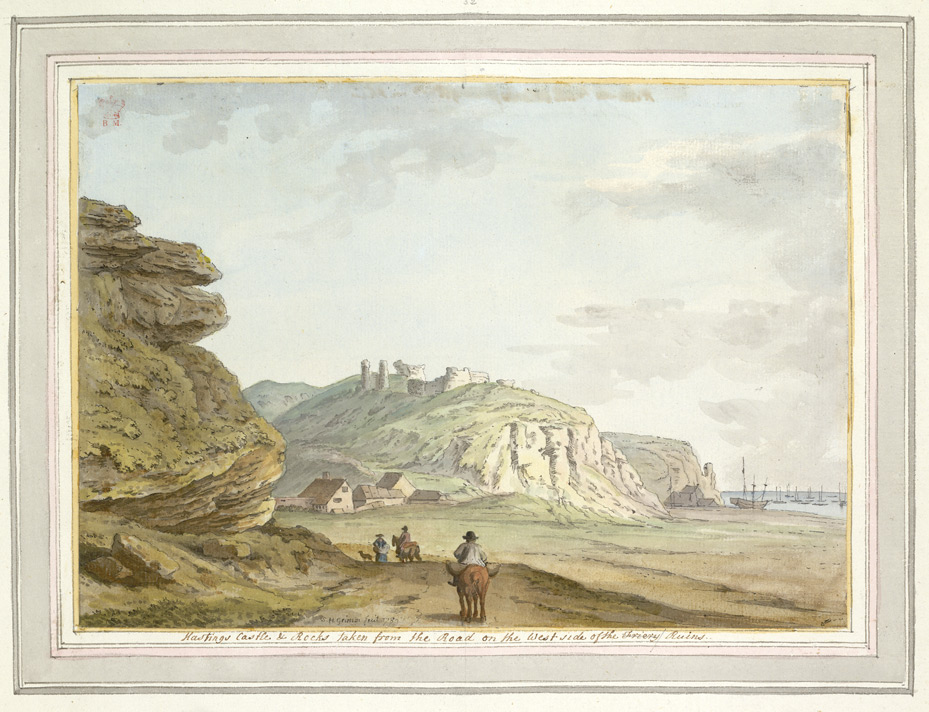
Hastings Castle in 1784

From July 1225 Robert was Constable of Hastings Castle, and received regular payments for his fees and for works and operations there. In 1226 he and brother Thomas the Templar were appointed to receive money on behalf of Richard, Earl of Cornwall. He was appointed to the position of Keeper of the Coast, then the name given to the office of Lord Warden of the Cinque Ports, in 1228. He was responsible for the general security of the ports between Sandwich and Portsmouth. He and Bertram de Criol, then Constable of Dover Castle, were favoured by a writ de intendendo issued to the bailiffs and barons of the Cinque Ports in 1229: in an equivalent writ of 1230, Henry de Sandwich appears in de Auberville's place.

Robert witnessed a charter of confirmation to Hubert de Burgh in 1227. At about that time both he and Bertram de Criol also witnessed a grant to Hubert by Roger de Ware, and a companion deed of quitclaim, of land in Westminster, and also Hubert's own grant of the church of St Leonard, Alderton to the Premonstratensian abbey of St Radegund at Bradsole. In 1229 he was among the principal witnesses to the foundation charter of Michelham Priory under the hand of Gilbert de Aquila.

In September 1229 he, with the sheriffs, received the king's command to deliver all the ships that he held in the various ports capable of carrying 16 horses to Portsmouth by the end of the month for the king's service, allowing any smaller vessels to go about their business. By the king's order the custody of Hastings Castle, "which Robert de Auberville had during the king's pleasure" was ordered to be given up by the Constable to John de Gatesden on 18 March 1230. In the spring of 1230 the King made his military expedition to Poitou, and in May full commands were given for the defence of the ports, in which John de Gatesden had some responsibility for Shoreham, Winchelsea, Rye and Seaford, in addition to Hastings and Pevensey Castles which he as Constable was especially instructed to prepare, arm and defend. Similar instructions were given to Bertram de Criol and Henry de Sandwich as Wardens of Dover and Sandwich respectively.

This surrender is taken by Paget to indicate that Robert had died by 1230. His name disappears from the Rolls. If he died then, the date of 1245 given by Planché for a grant by William de Auberville the younger (Hugh's son) to the priory of Christ Church, Canterbury, witnessed by Sir Robert de Auberville, Sir Simon de Haute (Hauth) and Sir Simon de Sandwich, begs an explanation.

== Family ==
Clarice, daughter and heiress of Robert de Auberville and Claricia de Gestling, is introduced in the medieval French "ancestor romance" (an early 14th-century prose narrative based on a lost metrical romance) called The History of Fulk Fitz Warin, as the second wife of Fulk III FitzWarin, the marcher lord with whom the second and third parts of that narrative are particularly concerned. Clarice de Auberville is described as the wife of his later years, during which Fulke, having been restored to his English lands and grown very old, became blind. This outline was followed as if factual, in his Baronage, by Sir William Dugdale, and, despite occasional doubts, later accounts of the family have accepted this precedent.

Clarice and her husband were living in 1250, when the Fine rolls record that they gave the king one mark for a writ ad terminum in the jurisdiction of Kent. In 1249 Fulk was recorded in the King's Bench to have acknowledged that he had given and confirmed to his daughter Mabil his entire manor of Lambourn, Berkshire. They were the parents of:

- Ammabil (Mabel) FitzWarin (d. 1297), who married (1) William de Crèvequer, and (2) John de Tregoz (d. c.1300). There were two daughters by the second marriage.

Honorary titles
Preceded by William d'Avranches	Lord Warden of the Cinque Ports; 1228	Succeeded by Peter de Rivaux
