= Nicholas de Crioll =

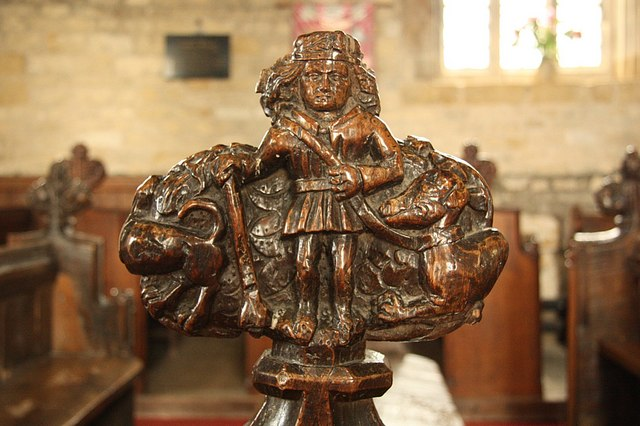
Pew carving at Croxton popularly thought to represent Nicholas de Crioll

Nicholas de Crioll (Cryoyll, Kerrial or Kyriel) (died c. February 1272), of a family seated in Kent, was Constable of Dover Castle and Keeper of the Coast during the early 1260s. His kinsman Bertram de Criol (died 1256) had distinguished himself in these offices during the preceding 20 years and both were near predecessors of the eminent Warden of the Cinque Ports, Stephen de Pencester (of Penshurst).

== Kinship ==
Although Nicholas de Crioll is often taken to be (and may well have been) a son of Bertram de Criol, the fact is not overtly stated. In 1242 King Henry granted the manor of Croxton, Leicestershire, to Bertram. The place was of special significance to the king as his father King John's heart was buried in Croxton Abbey, and he made many acts of patronage towards it. By 1246 the manor had passed (no doubt in token of a near kinship) to Nicholas de Crioll, who was granted a market and fair there, and the village took its name Croxton Kerrial from the Crioll or Kyriel family's connection with it. Bertram de Criol's son Sir John de Criol (died 1264) is, however, referred to as his "son and heir", and John had a younger brother Sir Simon de Criol (died 1267), his fellow-juror in the inquisition upon Thomas de Normanville in 1245-46: Nicholas de Crioll is sometimes in their company as a fellow witness, and is clearly associated with them, but the relationship is not explained.

== Marriage ==
Croxton Abbey was a Premonstratensian house, and the tenure of the neighbouring manor by Nicholas de Crioll may be connected with the tradition of patronage towards the Premonstratensians in the family of his wife, Joan de Auberville. She was heir to the senior line of the de Auberville inheritance, only daughter of William de Auberville (the younger), son of Hugh, and grandson of William de Auberville (the elder) and his wife Matilda, daughter of Ranulf de Glanville and Bertha de Valoines. William the elder had assisted Ranulf in the foundation of Leiston Abbey in Suffolk in 1182, and himself founded Langdon Abbey in Kent, near the de Auberville seat of Westenhanger, in 1191, a grant which was confirmed by his fee-lord Simon de Averenches, Lord of Folkestone. Both were Premonstratensian houses. The de Criol family, which in Bertram gave long and distinguished service in the Constabulary of Dover Castle, were patrons also of St Radegund's Abbey at Bradsole.

Robert de Auberville (brother of Joan's grandfather Hugh), after being among the rebel barons captured by King John at Rochester Castle late in 1215, served King Henry loyally as Constable of Hastings Castle during the 1220s. He was given authority jointly with Bertram de Criol for the defence of the ports between Sandwich and Portsmouth in 1229, and was replaced in that role by Henry de Sandwich (de Sandwico), Warden of Sandwich, in 1230: John de Gatesden, succeeding Robert as Constable of Hastings, then took on a larger command. Joan de Auberville was first married to Henry de Sandwich, and was his widow when she married Nicholas de Crioll. In this way the de Auberville possessions, including Westenhanger, came into the de Crioll family.

== Royal service ==
Nicholas is described as "vadlettus", a royal servant, in orders requiring him to hunt for deer in the park at Clere (Highclere, Hampshire) in 1243, at Guildford in 1244, and at Havering in 1245. The Croxton market grant followed, and in 1248 he received a gift of two does from the park at Elham near Folkestone, from the king. In that year he received a summons for himself and two knights to be in London on 21 August to go into Gascony on the King's service. He was in Gascony with Bertram de Criol from Easter 1249 for four months, upon a mission to deliver funds to the viceroy Simon de Montfort.

He was among those who crossed with the king to Gascony in 1253, and again in 1254 in company with his serjeant William de Waleton. His name heads the list of men summoned to Chester on 9 August 1257 for the service of the king and Edward his son in Wales. This assembly was to support King Henry's response (which proved ineffectual) to the English defeat at the Battle of Cadfan by the Welsh under Llywelyn ap Gruffudd earlier in the same year. In May 1260 de Crioll appears as Constable of Dover Castle. He was entrusted with the safekeeping of great sums of the King's money delivered to him from France by Aubrey de Fiscamp and William de Axemuth, the King's clerks. Arrangements were to be made for the delivery of some part of it to the king, for the payment of £1000, and for the safe retention of the remainder at Dover.

A year later an important ecclesiastical inquisition was held at Otford Palace to determine the true heirs to the estate (sometime considered a barony) of Eynsford, Kent, following the death, in the archbishop's wardship, of William de Eynsford the 7th lord. It was claimed in two moieties by Nicholas de Crioll and William Herengod. With the extinction of the descent from William the 5th lord (great-grandfather of the deceased) their claim lay in the descent from his sisters Joan, who married Hugh de Auberville (grandfather of Joan, wife of Nicholas) and Beatrice, who by marriage to Stephen Herengod was mother to the co-claimant. This defeated a counter-claim from an elder branch of the family which had never held seisin, and was decided in favour of de Crioll and Herengod.

== The Second Barons' War ==
In June 1263 the king committed to Nicholas de Crioll the Wardenship of the Cinque Ports, with instructions to Robert de Glastonia, Constable of Dover Castle, to provide him with quarters at the Castle when he should return there. The barons and bailiffs of Dover, Hastings, Romney, Hythe and Sandwich were required "to provide by his counsel two or three of the most approved men for the security and defence of the port[s] by sea and land against any adversaries or rebels." In September 1263 de Crioll received a mandate to take charge of the county of Kent and the Hundred of Middleton in the absence of a Sheriff, and to deliver the issues for munitions to the Constable of Dover.

At the death of Hamo de Crevecoeur, Lord of the barony of Chatham and of Leeds Castle, early in 1263, Nicholas is shown to have held five knights' fees from the barony of Folkestone, for which he did service as of the fee of Morteyne. His tenure owed three watches to ward of Dover Castle, and it is recorded that he held from the king in capite by barony elsewhere. Hamo held the Folkestone barony in husband-right of his second wife Matilda de Averenches, Lady of Folkestone, who had died c.1250. John de Criol's son Bertram (the younger) was married to Eleanor de Crevecoeur (third daughter of Hamo and Matilda), who with her sisters inherited the Folkestone barony.

The de Crioll family was variously involved in the revolt of 1264. Richard de Clare had died in 1262, reputedly in the house of John de Crioll at Bletchingley, and Sir John himself, having been summoned to fight the Welsh in 1263, died not long afterwards. His son Sir Bertram (to whom in February 1264 Roger de Leybourne confirmed the lease of the manor of Dartford) was with Gilbert de Clare in the siege of Rochester Castle, which was held for the king by de Leybourne. An inquisition upon the rebels described Bertram as an enemy of King Henry's and King Edward's, being of the household of Sir Henry de Montfort, and that certain lands of his were seized by the Earl of Gloucester and afterwards by Roger de Leybourne, but were later redeemed. His kinsman Robert de Crevecoeur, grandson and heir of Hamo, was with Simon de Montfort at the Battle of Lewes. The same inquest records that Laurence de Fonte of Canterbury was with Sir Nicholas de Crioll before, during and after the war, and stayed with him until his death, but it was not believed that he was present at any siege or spoil. In September 1265 Nicholas de Crioll, Knight, was, with John de Chausy (Templar) and Richard de Maneton (Hospitaller) charged with ensuring the safe conduct of the envoys of the King of France into the king's presence.

== The second marriage ==
After the death of Joan de Auberville Nicholas took a second wife Margery, thought to have been the daughter of Simon de Cray. She must have been a much younger woman, for she had a son and a daughter by Nicholas and four more daughters by a later (Clifford) marriage, and lived down to 1319, when she left a will. The clarification that he was not the husband of Maud, daughter of William de Essetesford (Ashford), as suggested in some sources, is owing to the recognition that the manor of "Stokton" (Great Staughton, Huntingdonshire) was in the possession of Nicholas (and of William Herengod) as a parcel of his inheritance through Joan de Auberville, and not by a previous marriage. Maud's first husband was Simon de Crioll (died 1267), the younger brother of John de Crioll: the manor was given by Nicholas and William to Roger de Leybourn, and by him to Maud and her second husband Roger de Rolling.

Nicholas died by 10 February 1272. Wardship of all the lands of the elder Nicholas which were held in chief, and the marriage of his heirs, was granted to Edward the King's son on 16 February 1272 and in the March following. Certain lands in Kent were granted in wardship on his son's behalf to Sir Gregory de Rokesley, Lord Mayor of London, until Michaelmas 8 Edward I (1280).

== Family ==
Nicholas de Crioll married first Joan de Auberville, the widow of Henry de Sandwich. Their son was:

- Nicholas Crioll, who married Margery, daughter of Gilbert Pecche, upon whom (with the assent of his father) he settled the manor of Benhall, Suffolk, in dower for term of her life. This Nicholas died c. 1303, whereupon Margery obtained licence to remarry, and asserted her right in dower. Soon afterwards Ralph le Sauvage and his wife Margery (who alone quitclaimed for herself and her heirs) by fine completed the transfer of the manor of Benhall to Guy Ferre the younger, which had been commenced in 1290 by Nicholas Crioll the younger. Nicholas the younger and Margery had an heir
  - Nicholas de Criel, aged nearly 21 in November 1303.

Nicholas de Crioll the elder married secondly Margery, supposed daughter of Simon de Cray. Margery lived to 1319 and left a will. Her children supposed born of her marriage to Nicholas were:

- Bertram de Crioll, with his mother a benefactor of Croxton Abbey.
- Margery de Crioll, who married John, son of Geoffrey de Say by January 1286/87.

Sir Nicholas de Criel drew up an agreement concerning a marriage at Canterbury in connection with Sir Roger de Leyburne in c. 1261.

== Erasure ==
The arms of de Crioll appear in several of the earliest armorial rolls. The shield for Nicholas de Crioll is the one which was erased (presumably on the initiative of Sir Edward Dering) from the heraldic roll of c. 1280 known as the Dering Roll, to make way for Sir Edward's suppositious ancestor Richard fitz Dering.

== See also ==
- De Criol

| Preceded by Hugh Bigod | Lord Warden of the Cinque Ports; 1260 | Succeeded by Robert de Walerand |
