= Henry Hose =

Anglo-Norman noble (fl. 1236–1241)

The Hussey family, after 1066, settled in Dorset, but were also found in Berkshire, Wiltshire and Somerset. In medieval England the name of Hussey was generally spelt as 'Hose', evolving into Hoese, Huse, Husee, and thence to Hussey, and in Latin was first known as Hosatus.

- Hubert de Hoese (Hose or Hussey) was Lord Warden of the Cinque Ports 1225
- Henry de Hoese (Henry Hussey), Lord Hastings, was Lord Warden of the Cinque Ports 1236–1241

Honorary titles
Preceded by Bertram de Criol	Lord Warden of the Cinque Ports; 1236–c1241	Succeeded by The Lord de Segrove
