= Cattawade Marshes =

SSSI near Manningtree, Essex, England

Coordinates: 51.9564°N 1.0483°E

- Site of Special Scientific Interest
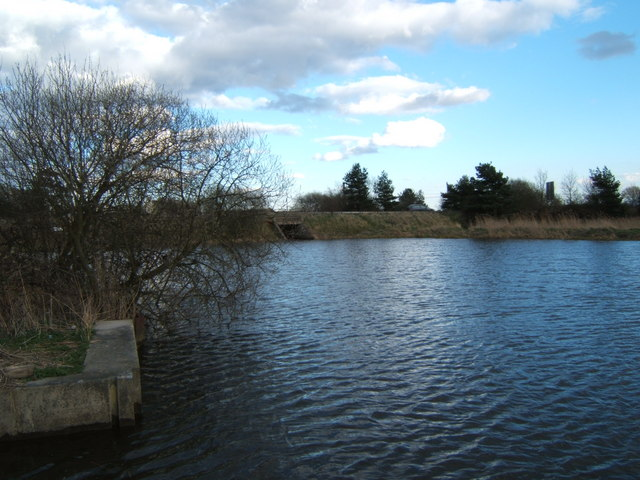
- Location of Cattawade Marshes.
- Area of search: Essex; Suffolk
- Grid reference: TM090329
- Interest: Biological
- Area: 88.2 hectares (218 acres)
- Notification date: 1988
- Location map: Magic Map

Cattawade Marshes is an 88.2-hectare (218-acre) biological Site of Special Scientific Interest between East Bergholt and Manningtree in Essex and Suffolk, England. It is managed by the Royal Society for the Protection of Birds. It is a Ramsar wetland of international importance, and part of the Stour and Orwell Special Protection Area, and the Dedham Vale Area of Outstanding Natural Beauty.

The site is a marsh area between two arms of the River Stour. It is of major importance for breeding birds, especially waders and wildfowl, such as Shoveler, Teal, Tufted Duck and Water Rail. Other habitats are grassland and ditches.

There is no public access but the site can be viewed from a public footpath on the south side of the river.
