= Lord Warden of the Cinque Ports =

Ceremonial post in the United Kingdom

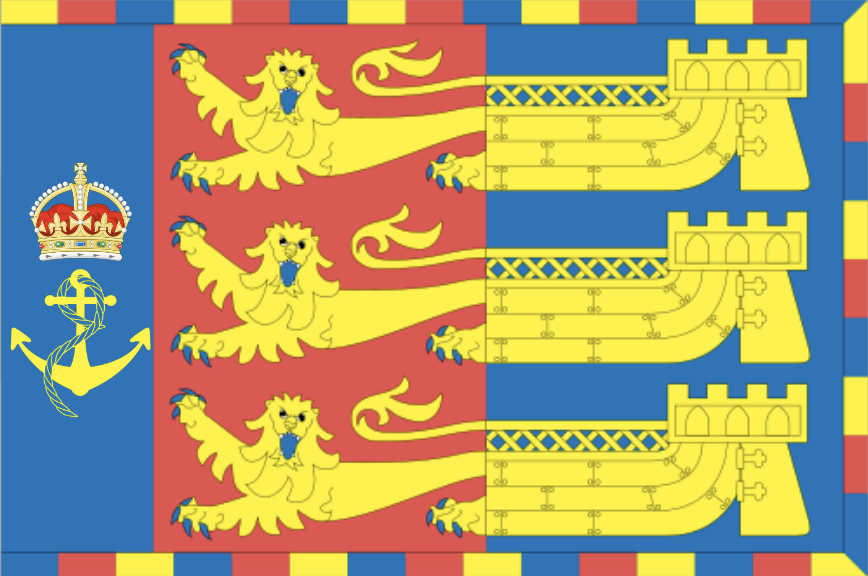
Banner of the Lord Warden of the Cinque Ports, Admiral Sir George Zambellas.

Lord Warden of the Cinque Ports (Latin: Dominus Custos Quinque Portuum) is the name of a ceremonial post in the United Kingdom. The post dates from at least the 12th century, when the title was Keeper of the Coast, but it may be older. The Lord Warden was originally in charge of the Cinque Ports (/sɪŋk pɔːrts/ sink ports), a group of five (cinque in Norman French) port towns on the southeast coast of England formed to collectively supply ships for The Crown in the absence of a formal navy at that time. Today, the post is a sinecure and an honorary title, and 14 towns belong to the Cinque Ports confederation. The title is one of the higher honours bestowed by the Sovereign; it has often been held by members of the Royal Family or by prime ministers, especially those who were influential in defending Britain in times of war.

The Lord Warden was solely responsible for the return of all writs to the Crown, along with the collection of taxes and the arrest of criminals. His court was held in St James's church, near Dover Castle, and there he exercised jurisdiction broadly equivalent to that of Chancery. He also had a "lieutenant's powers of muster". The Constableship of Dover Castle, later added (1267) to the warden's office, enabled him to keep a garrison and administrative staff, including the clerk and the lieutenant of the castle.

The coat of arms of the Cinque Ports is first recorded in 1305 (and is probably a few years older), predating even the arms of the City of London. The arms comprise a shield divided per pale (vertically), depicting on the dexter side (viewer's left) three gold half lions passant gardant on a red field; and on the sinister side (viewer's right) three gold half ships' hulls on a blue field. These arms are also flown as an heraldic banner (flag); and (with additional elements indicating the individual office-holder) form the basis of the banner of the Lord Warden.

== Creation and appointment of the Lord Warden ==
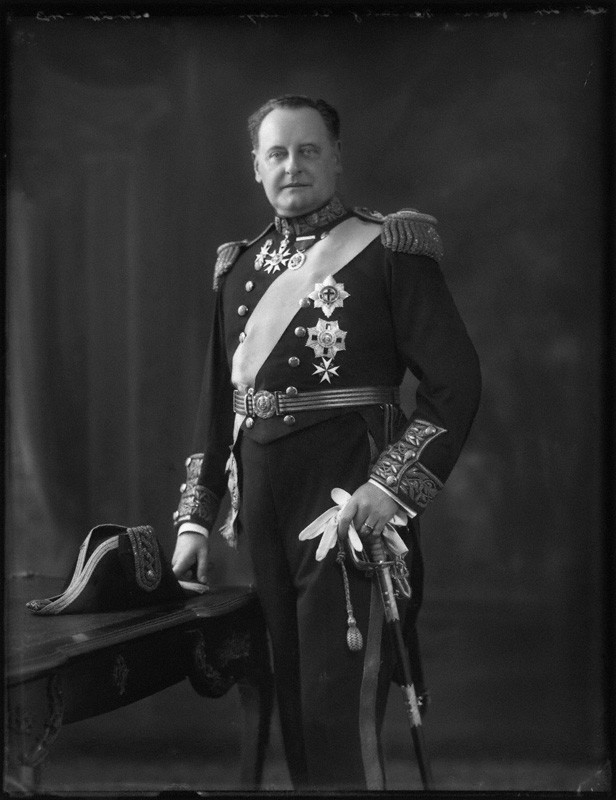
The 7th Earl Beauchamp in the uniform of Lord Warden of the Cinque Ports (1924).

The creation and appointment of the Lord Warden, once among the most powerful appointments of the realm, by the Sovereign was instituted principally after the portsmen sided with the Earl of Leicester against King Henry III, in the Second Barons' War, and was intended to provide some central authority over the Cinque Ports, which were essentially otherwise independent of the King's sheriffs. It was combined from 1267 with the office of Constable of Dover Castle. However, from 1708 Walmer Castle at Deal was to be preferred as the official residence of the Lord Warden of the Cinque Ports. The Lord Warden also holds the office of Admiral of the Cinque Ports with a maritime jurisdiction extending to the middle of the English Channel, from Redcliffe near Seaford, in Sussex, to the shore underneath the Naze Tower, encompassing Brightlingsea in Essex, the only Cinque Port north of the Thames. In earlier centuries the northern limit was taken as the Shoe Beacon in Essex.

The courts of Brodhull and Guestling were established to protect the privileges of the Cinque Ports by the portsmen themselves. From the 15th century these courts had been largely replaced by the Lord Warden's Court at Dover. From the 16th century the principal business of the courts was the installation of the Lord Warden and the court is now only occasionally summoned. The office continued to be a powerful one. In 1550 the Mayor and Jurats of Dover refused to accept a Royal Writ because it was not accompanied by a letter of attendance from the Lord Warden. The member ports' parliamentary representatives were appointed by the Lord Warden at first; despite an act passed in 1689 to curb this influence, it continued until the 19th century.

At the installation of a new Lord Warden, the Speaker of the Confederation of the Cinque Ports instructs the Lord Warden: "to undertake the duties of the Ancient and Honourable Office and to uphold the Franchises, Liberties, Customs and Usages of the port."

The office of Speaker has traditionally rotated between the affiliate townships every year dating from at least 1550. Inaugurations are begun on 21 May, and membership is ordained through a longstanding maritime tradition of a principle of the prevailing winds coming from west to east.

A unique uniform is specified for the Lord Warden (though those appointed to the office in the 21st century have, as retired admirals, worn naval uniform instead). The uniform is very similar to a pre-1956-pattern Admiral's uniform (complete with cocked hat) trimmed in red and with Cinque Ports insignia. Sir Winston Churchill's uniform is preserved at Chartwell; Sir Robert Menzies's uniform , which he wore as Lord Warden from 1966 to 1978, is preserved at the National Library of Australia.

== Barons of the Cinque Ports ==
All freemen of the ports, termed "portsmen", were deemed in the age of feudalism to be barons, and thus members of the baronage entitled to attend the king's parliament. Termed "Barons of the Cinque Ports", they reflected an early concept that military service at sea constituted land tenure per baroniam making them quasi feudal barons. The early 14th-century treatise Modus Tenendi Parliamentum stated the Barons of the Cinque Ports to hold a place of precedence below the lay magnates but above the representatives of the shires and boroughs. Writs of summons to Parliament were sent to the warden following which representative barons of the Cinque Ports were selected to attend parliament. Thus the warden's duty in this respect was similar to that of the sheriff who received the writs for distribution to the barons in the shires. The warden and barons often experienced clashes of jurisdiction. In the 21st century the title "Baron of the Cinque Ports" is now reserved for Freemen elected by the Mayor, Jurats, and Common Council of the Ports to attend a Coronation, and is solely honorary in nature.

== List of Lords Warden of the Cinque Ports ==
The first authoritative list of Cinque Ports Confederation Members was produced in 1293 when Stephen of Pencester was Warden. The Lord Warden of the Cinque Ports is appointed for life, but in the earliest of records this was not the case. The office of Lord Warden of the Cinque Ports has been traced from the year 1226 from the appointment of William de Averanch, although he was not the first incumbent of this office. The longest term of office was that of William Brook, Lord Cobham, who presided at the court for 40 years.

=== Constable of Dover Castle ===
Source: The Cinque Ports

- Leopoldus de Bertie? (Early 11th-century) Under Æthelred the Unready?
- Godwine, Earl of Wessex 1045–1053
- Harold Godwine, Earl of Wessex (King Harold II) 1053–1066
- Bertram Ashburnham (Constable of Dover Castle) 1066
- William de Peverell 1066 (Unconfirmed?)
- Odo, Bishop of Bayeux and Earl of Kent 1066–1082

Technically Vacant from 1082-1084 as Odo became imprisoned.

- John de Fiennes 1084–1085
- James de Fiennes (son of John) 1085–1111
- John de Fiennes (son of James) 1111–1138
- Walkelin de Magminot 1138
- Prince Eustace of Boulogne (son of King Stephen) 1138–1153
- Walkelin de Magminot 1153–1154
- Robert Fitz-Bernard 1154–1169
- Hugo de Mara 1169–1187
- Alan de Valeines (or Valoines) 1187–1190
- Matthew de Clere 1190–1195
- William de Wrotham 1195–1201
- Thomas Basset, Lord Hedendon 1201–1202
- Hubert de Burgh, 1st Earl of Kent 1202–1203
- William of Huntingfield 1203–1204
- William de Longespee 1204–1207
- Geoffrey Fitzpier, Earl of Essex 1207–1213
- William Briwere, Lord Torbay 1213–1215
- Hubert de Burgh, 1st Earl of Kent 1215–1220
- Henry de Braibroc 1220
- Robert de Neresford (Hereford) 1221–1223
- Hugh de Windsor 1223
- Stephen Langton, Archbishop of Canterbury 1223–1224
- Geoffery de Lucy, Lord Newington 1224–1225
- Hubert de Hoese (Hose or Hussey) 1225
- Geoffrey de Surland 1225–1226
- William d'Avranches, Lord Folkestone 1226–1227 (also Keeper of the Coast)
- Bertram de Criol, 1227 (also Keeper of the Coast)
- Hubert de Burgh, 1st Earl of Kent 1227–1232, and Robert de Auberville 1228–1235
- Henry de Hoese, Lord Hastings 1232
- Stephen, Lord de Segrave 1232–1235
- Humphrey de Bohun, 2nd Earl of Hereford 1235
- Bertram de Criol 1236
- Henry de Hoese (Henry Hussey), Lord Hastings 1236–1241
- Peter de Savoy, Earl of Richmond 1241–1242 (also Keeper of the Coast)
- Bertram de Criol 1242–1255 (also Keeper of the Coast)
- Reginald de Cobham, 1st Baron Cobham 1256–1258 (also Keeper of the Coast)
- Sir Roger Northwode 1258 (also Keeper of the Coast)
- Nicholas de Moels, Lord Caddebury 1258 (also Keeper of the Coast)
- Richard de Grey, Lord Condor 1258–1259 (also Keeper of the Coast)
- Hugh de Bigod 1259–1261 (also Keeper of the Coast)
- Robert de Walerand, Lord Kilpek 1261–1262
- Walter de Burgsted (also Keeper of the Coast) 1262
- Robert de Walerand 1263
- Richard de Grey, Lord Codnor 1263
- Prince Edmund (son of Henry III), jointly with Robert de Gascoyne 1263
- Henry of Sandwich, Bishop of London 1263
- John de Haia 1263
- Richard de Grey, Lord Codnor 1263
- Sir Roger de Leybourne 1263–1264
- Henry de Montfort 1264–1265
- Matthew de Hastings 1265
- Sir Roger de Leybourne 1265
- Prince Edward, (King Edward I) 1265–1266
- Sir Matthew de Bezille 1266–1267

=== Keeper of the Coast ===
- Odo, Bishop of Bayeux, 1066–1084
- Henry of Essex c.1150–1154
- Henry de Sandwich 1154–1189
- Simon de Sandwich 1154–1189
- Alan de Fienes 1154–1189
- James de Fienes 1189–1199
- Matthew de Clere 1189–1199
- William Devereux 1189–1199
- William Longchamp 1189–1199
- William de Wrotham 1189–1199
- Thomas Bassett 1199–1216
- William de Huntingfield 1199–1216
- William de Sarum 1199–1216
- Geoffrey FitzPiers 1199–1216
- William de Warenne, 5th Earl of Surrey 1204–1206 and 1214
- Hubert de Burgh, 1st Earl of Kent 1215–1220
- Geoffery de Lucy 1224 (and 1230)
- William d'Avranches 1226–1227
- Robert de Auberville 1228
- Peter de Rivaux 1232–1234
- Lord de Segrove
- Walerand Teutonicus 1235
- Hamo de Crevecoeur 1235
- Bertram de Criol 1236 (and intermittently until 1255)
- Humphrey de Bohun, 3rd Earl of Hereford 1241
- Peter de Savoy 1241
- Reginald de Cobham, 1st Baron Cobham 1255
- Sir Roger Northwode 1258
- Nicholas de Moels 1258
- Richard de Grey 1258
- Hugh de Bigod 1259–1260
- Nicholas de Crioll 1260–1263
- Robert de Walerand 1261
- Walter de Burgsted 1263
- Humphrey de Bohun, 3rd Earl of Hereford c.1264
- Edmund Crouchback, 1st Earl of Lancaster (uncertain)
- Henry de Sandwich, Bishop of London, 1263
- Sir Roger de Leybourne 1263
- Henry de Montfort 1264
- Matthew de Hastings 1265
- Edward "Longshanks", Earl of Chester 1265
- Sir Matthew de Bezille 1266

=== Lord Warden and Constable of Dover Castle (since 1267) ===
- Sir Stephen de Pencester 1267–1271 (then at intervals until 1298, for a total of 32 years)
- Sir Simon de Creye 1275
- Robert de Burghersh, 1st Baron Burghersh 1299–1306

==== 14th century ====
- Henry de Cobham, 1st Baron Cobham 1307
- Robert de Kendall 1307
- Henry de Cobham, 1st Baron Cobham 1315
- Bartholomew de Badlesmere, 1st Baron Badlesmere 1320
- Hugh le Despenser, 1st Earl of Winchester 1320
- Edmund of Woodstock, 1st Earl of Kent 1321
- Sir John Peche 1323
- Ralph Basset, 2nd Baron Basset of Drayton 1325
- Bartholomew de Burghersh, 1st Baron Burghersh 1327
- William de Clinton, 1st Earl of Huntingdon 1330
- Bartholomew de Burghersh, 1st Baron Burghersh 1348
- Roger Mortimer, 2nd Earl of March 1355
- John Beauchamp, 3rd Baron Beauchamp 1359
- Sir Robert de Herle 1361
- Baron Spigurnell 1364
- Sir Richard de Pembrugge 1370
- Andrew de Guldeford 1371
- William Latimer, 4th Baron Latimer 1374
- Sir Thomas Reines
- Edmund of Langley, Earl of Cambridge 1376
- Sir Robert Assheton 1381
- Sir Simon de Burley 1384
- John Devereux, 1st Baron Devereux 1387
- John Beaumont, 4th Baron Beaumont 1392
- Edmund of Langley, 1st Duke of York 1396
- John Beaufort, 1st Marquess of Dorset 1398
- Sir Thomas Erpingham 1399

==== 15th century ====
- Henry "of Monmouth", Prince of Wales 1409
- Thomas FitzAlan, 12th Earl of Arundel and 10th Earl of Surrey 1412
- Humphrey, Duke of Gloucester 1415
- James Fiennes, 1st Baron Saye and Sele 1447
- Humphrey Stafford, 1st Duke of Buckingham 1450
- Richard, Lord Rivers 1459
- Richard Neville, 16th Earl of Warwick 1460
- Sir John Scott 1471
- William FitzAlan, 16th Earl of Arundel 1483–1488
- Philip Fitz Lewes 1488-1492
- Sir William Scott 1492
- Prince Henry, later King Henry VIII of England 1493

==== 16th century ====
- Sir Edward Poynings 1509-1521
- George Nevill, 5th Baron Bergavenny (appointed, but resigned)
- Sir Edward Guilford 1519–1534
- George Boleyn, 2nd Viscount Rochford 1534–1536
- Henry FitzRoy, Duke of Richmond and Somerset 1536
- Sir Thomas Cheney 1536-1539
- Arthur Plantagenet, 1st Viscount Lisle 1539–1542
- Sir Thomas Cheney 1542-1558
- Sir Thomas Seymour (temporary joint Lord Wardenship with Sir Thomas Cheney in 1545)
- William Brooke, 10th Baron Cobham 1558-1597
- Henry Brooke, 11th Baron Cobham (son of above) 1597-1603

==== 17th century ====
- Henry Howard, 1st Earl of Northampton 1604–1614
- Robert Carr, 1st Earl of Somerset 1614–1615
- Edward, Lord Zouche of Haryngworth 21 August 1615–6 December 1624
- George Villiers, 1st Duke of Buckingham 6 December 1624–23 August 1628
- Theophilus Howard, 2nd Earl of Suffolk 2 September 1628–3 June 1640
- James Stewart, Duke of Richmond and Lennox 18 July 1640–1642
- Sir Edward Boys 1642–1646
- Major John Boys 1646–1648
- Sir Algernon Sydney 1648–1651
- Colonel Thomas Kelsey 1651–1656
- Admiral Robert Blake 1656–1657
- Heneage Finch, 3rd Earl of Winchilsea 1660 (unconfirmed term; may have been father/son)
- James Stuart, Duke of York and Albany 1660–1673
- Colonel John Beaumont 1673–1691
- Henry Sydney, 1st Earl of Romney 1691–1702

==== 18th century ====
- Prince George of Denmark 1702–1708
- Lionel Sackville, 7th Earl of Dorset 1708–1712 (served two terms)
- James Butler, 2nd Duke of Ormonde 1712–1715
- John Sidney, 6th Earl of Leicester 1717–1727
- Lionel Sackville, 1st Duke of Dorset 1727–1765
- Robert Darcy, 4th Earl of Holderness 1765–1778
- Frederick North, Lord North (2nd Earl of Guilford from 1790) 1778–1792
- William Pitt the Younger 1792–1806

==== 19th century ====
- Robert Jenkinson, 2nd Earl of Liverpool 1806–1827
- Arthur Wellesley, 1st Duke of Wellington 1829–1852
- James Broun-Ramsay, 1st Marquess of Dalhousie 1853–1860
- Henry Temple, 3rd Viscount Palmerston 1860–1865
- Granville Leveson-Gower, 2nd Earl Granville 1865–1891 (not installed?)
- William Henry Smith 1891 (not installed?)
- Frederick Hamilton-Temple-Blackwood, 1st Marquess of Dufferin and Ava 1892–1895
- Robert Gascoyne-Cecil, 3rd Marquess of Salisbury 1895–1903

==== 20th century ====
- George Curzon, 1st Baron Curzon of Kedleston 1904–1905
- George, Prince of Wales 1905–1907
- Thomas Brassey, 1st Earl Brassey 1908–1913
- William Lygon, 7th Earl Beauchamp 1913–1934
- Rufus Isaacs, 1st Marquess of Reading 1934–1935
- Freeman Freeman-Thomas, 1st Marquess of Willingdon 1936–1941
- Sir Winston Churchill 1941–1965 (installed August 1946)
- Sir Robert Menzies 1965–1978 (installed July 1966)
- Queen Elizabeth the Queen Mother 1978–2002 (installed August 1979)

==== 21st century ====
- Admiral of the Fleet Michael Boyce, Baron Boyce 2004–2022 (installed April 2005)
- Admiral Sir George Zambellas 2024–present

== See also ==
- The History of the Castle, Town, and Port of Dover, 1899 book
- Lord Warden of the Stannaries
- Lord Warden of the Marches
- Great Officers of State
