= De Criol =

De Criol is a patronymic surname of French and/or Catalan origin, most likely from near Normandy. It is derived from the obsolete Catalan personal name Oriol, which is Old French and Old Catalan for "Oriole," which in turn comes from the Latin word Aureolus, which means "Golden." The name is recorded in England as early as 1194 A.D.

The name is most often found in Western Europe and Haiti.

Famous people with the surname include:

- Bertram de Criol (died 1256), English nobleman.
- Nicholas de Criol (died 1272), English nobleman; probably the son of Bertram.
- Alice de Criol, first wife of Sir John Fogge.
