= Henry de Sandwich =

Lord Warden of the Clinque Ports

Sir Henry de Sandwich was Lord Warden of the Cinque Ports during the 13th century.

He was a son of Simon de Sandwich of Preston in Kent, where Henry was born, and also held the post of Constable of Dover Castle.

He married Joan d'Auberville. Their daughter Juliana de Sandwich was born in 1245 and resided at Preston in Kent (died 1327); she married William de Leybourne (Leyburn), Lord Leyburn, (1242–1309).

The tomb of Henry de Sandwich is in the Chapel of St. Bartholomew located in St. Bartholomew's Hospital, Dover Road, Sandwich. Open for viewing every Sunday at normal worshipping times.

Political offices
Preceded by Edmund 'Crouchback'	Lord Warden of the Cinque Ports; 1264	Succeeded by John de Haia
