= St. Radegund's Abbey =

Monastery in Hougham Without, Kent, England

Coordinates: 51°7′55″N 1°15′3″E

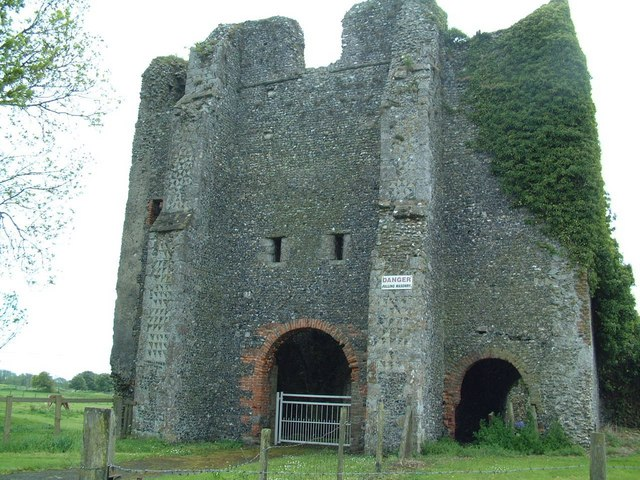
The abbey gatehouse

St. Radegund's Abbey at Bradsole was a medieval monastic house in the parish of Hougham Without near Dover in southeast England. It was dedicated to Radegund, the sixth-century Merovingian princess, who, once married to the unsavory King Chlothar I, turned to a life of asceticism and charitable works. The remains of the abbey buildings have since have been incorporated into a farm.

The abbey was founded in 1191 on the land of Bradsole Manor, which had been donated by King Richard I. The community was established by Premonstratensian Canons sent over from the mother abbey of Prémontré in Aisne, France, and building commenced in 1191, lasting some fifty years. Although the abbey benefitted from its control of several local churches, the site itself proved fairly inhospitable.

By the end of the 13th century the monks were occupied in increasingly secular activities such as supervising the building of Dover Castle and by the end of the following century the monastic buildings had fallen into a state of neglect, with only 8 canons still in residence. In 1538 the abbey was dissolved as part of the Dissolution of the Monasteries and much of the stone carried away to help build Sandgate Castle.

The site was sold to Simon Edolph in 1590, who converted the refectory building into a farmhouse. Still standing, it is a Grade II* listed building. The remaining ruins, part of which act as a gateway to the farmhouse, have also been Grade II* listed.

== Burials ==
- Thomas Poynings, 2nd Baron Poynings (1349–1375)
