= Hastings Castle =

Grade I listed ruins in the United Kingdom

- Hastings, East Sussex
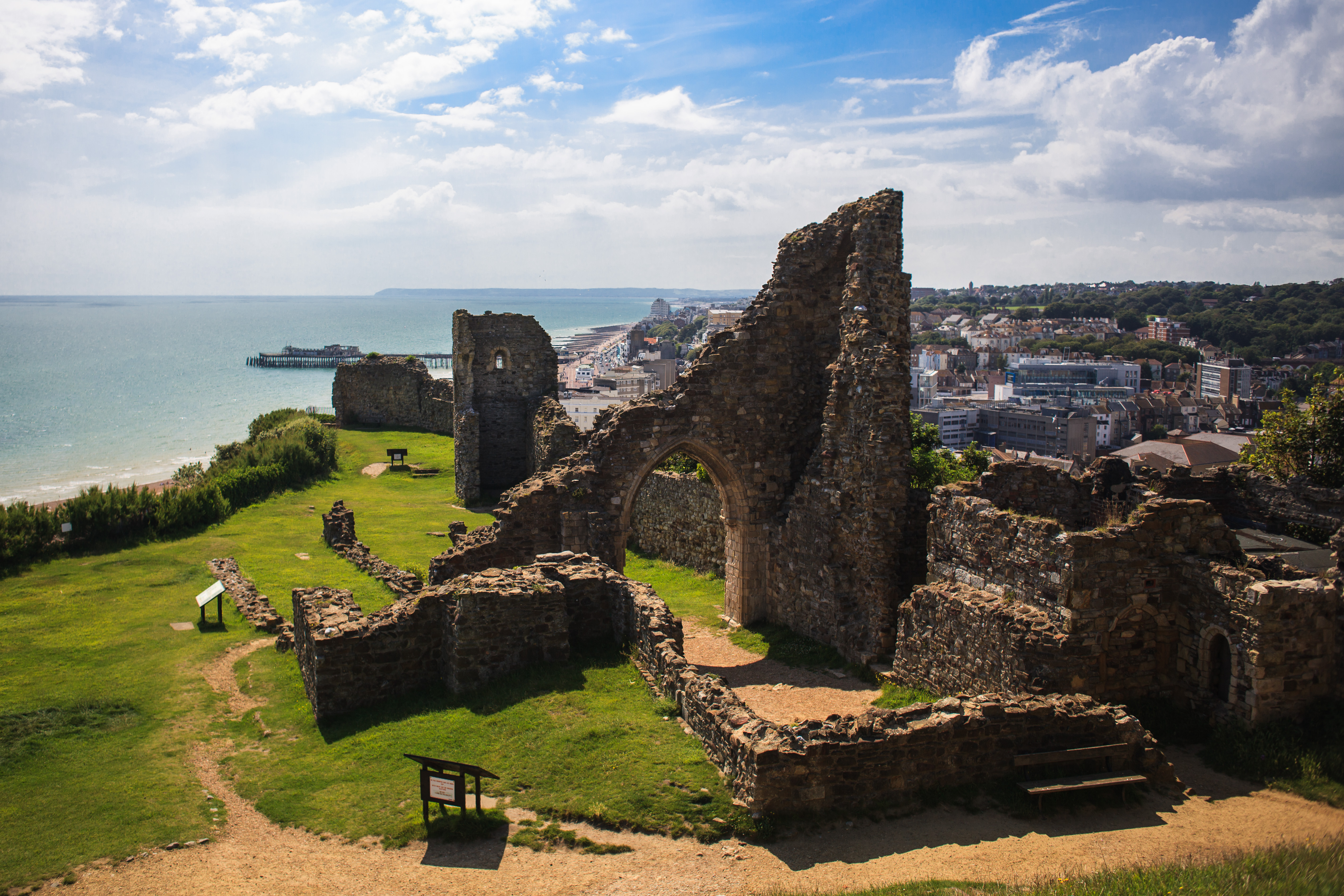
- General view of Hastings Castle

Site information
- Type: Keep and bailey
- Owner: Local Authority
- Open to the public: Yes
- Condition: Fragmented Ruins

Location
- Location within East Sussex
- Coordinates: 50°51′23″N 0°35′14″E

Site history
- Built: 12th Century
- Materials: Stone
- Demolished: Ruined by 1399

Hastings Castle is a keep and bailey castle ruin situated on the cliffs adjoining the town of Hastings, East Sussex. It overlooks the English Channel, into which large parts of the castle have fallen over the years.

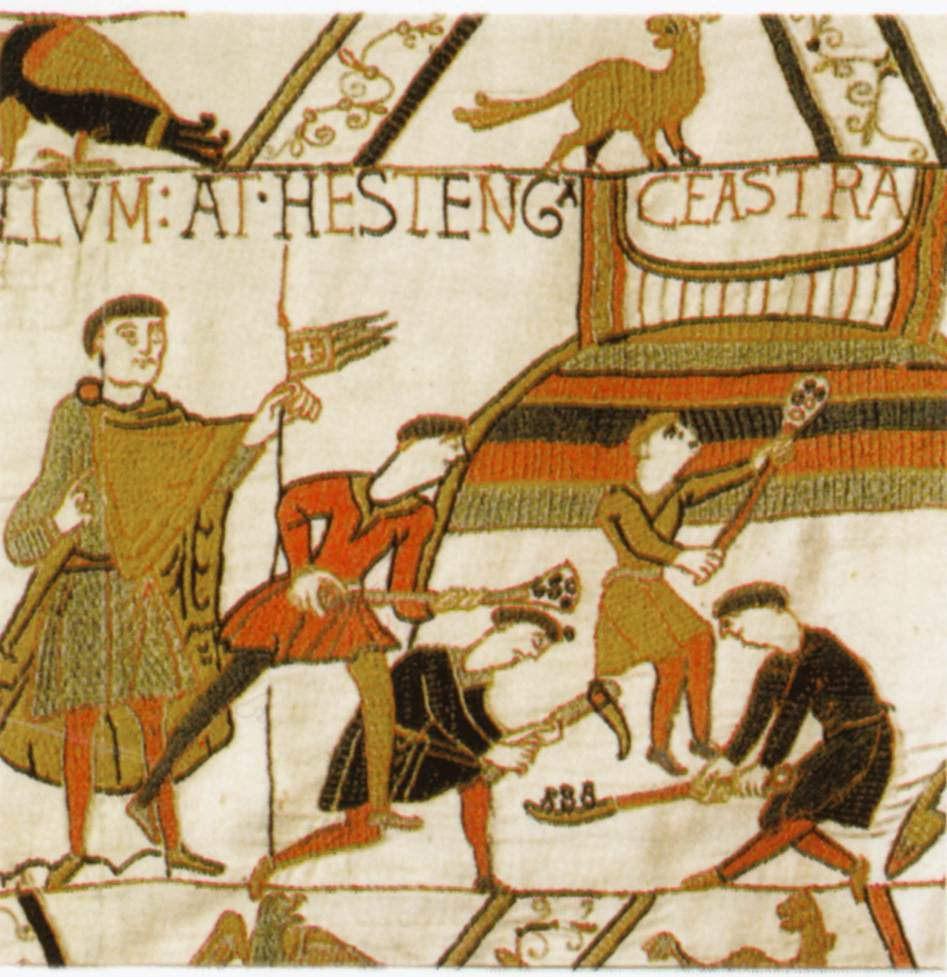
The construction of Hastings Castle ('HESTENGA CEASTRA') depicted in the Bayeux Tapestry, showing the raising of an earthen motte topped by a wooden palisade.

== Location ==
Situated on the cliffs above Hastings, the castle on West Hill is 60-70m above sea level. The site gives clear views along the coast to the West towards Normans' Bay, Pevensey Bay, and to Beachy Head. The closest points in France are Boulogne-su-Mer at about 73km and Cap Blanc-Nez at about 80km. From the castle, only the very highest points at those locations are theoretically visible on very clear days. However, this vantage point does give excellent views of ships in the English Channel.

== History ==
Immediately after landing in England in 1066, William of Normandy ordered three fortifications to be built, Pevensey Castle in September 1066 (re-using the Roman Saxon Shore fort of Anderitum), Hastings (prior to the Battle of Hastings) and Dover. Hastings Castle was originally built as a wooden motte-and-bailey castle near the sea. Later that year, the famous Battle of Hastings took place some miles to the north of Hastings Castle, in which William was victorious. In 1070, William issued orders for the castle to be rebuilt in stone, along with the St Mary's Chapel.

The Counts of Eu held the castle for most of the Norman period, beginning with Robert. In 1216, King John gave orders to destroy (slight) the castles at Hastings and Pevensey, while he retreated from a French army that had landed in Kent under the leadership of Prince Louis of France. In 1220, Henry III re-fortified the castle.

In time however the house of Eu forfeited control of Hastings Castle, when the family heir William made the decision to keep his French assets over the English ones, and was denied the right to his inheritance. In 1249, Henry III bestowed rule of the castle and its lands, the Honour of Eu, to his wife's uncle, Peter of Savoy. Peter held the rights from 1249 until 1254, whence they passed to the Lord Edward, future Edward I of England. In 1262 and in need of funds, Edward quitclaimed the Honour and Hastings back to Peter who held the rights until his death in 1268.

In February 1287, violent storms hit the south coast of England with such force that the soft sandstone cliffs eventually succumbed to the elements. Large sections of the face fell into the sea along with parts of the castle.

In both 1339 and 1377, the town was attacked by the French leaving many burnt buildings which included homes. Throughout the next century erosion was unchecked and gradually more of the castle was lost to the sea. The original castle keep is no longer visible.

The site was purchased by Thomas Pelham on 23 June 1591. After the purchase, the site was purchased by the Pelham family and used for farming until the ruins had become so overgrown they were lost from memory.

In 1824, the castle's owner the Earl of Chichester commissioned some archaeological investigations of the ruin. As a result of these, the chapel floor and parts of the chancel arch and walls were re-constructed out of blocks found lying on the ground. In the 19th century a garden was created on the motte and cleared to top to a depth below the medieval remains.

During World War II, the castle received more damage as Hastings was a target for bombing raids. In 1951, the Hastings Corporation purchased the site and converted it into a tourist attraction. In 1990 an audio-visual presentation, "The 1066 Story", was opened, housed in a replica medieval siege tent. This has since been closed, but the concrete plinth built for it still remains.

The castle is open to the public between March and October. They also run guided tours and special events for schools and groups. In late 2026, the castle was one of 200 site added to the list of Historic England’s heritage at risk register.
