= Royal Navy Dockyard =

State-owned shipbuilding and maintenance facilities for the British navy

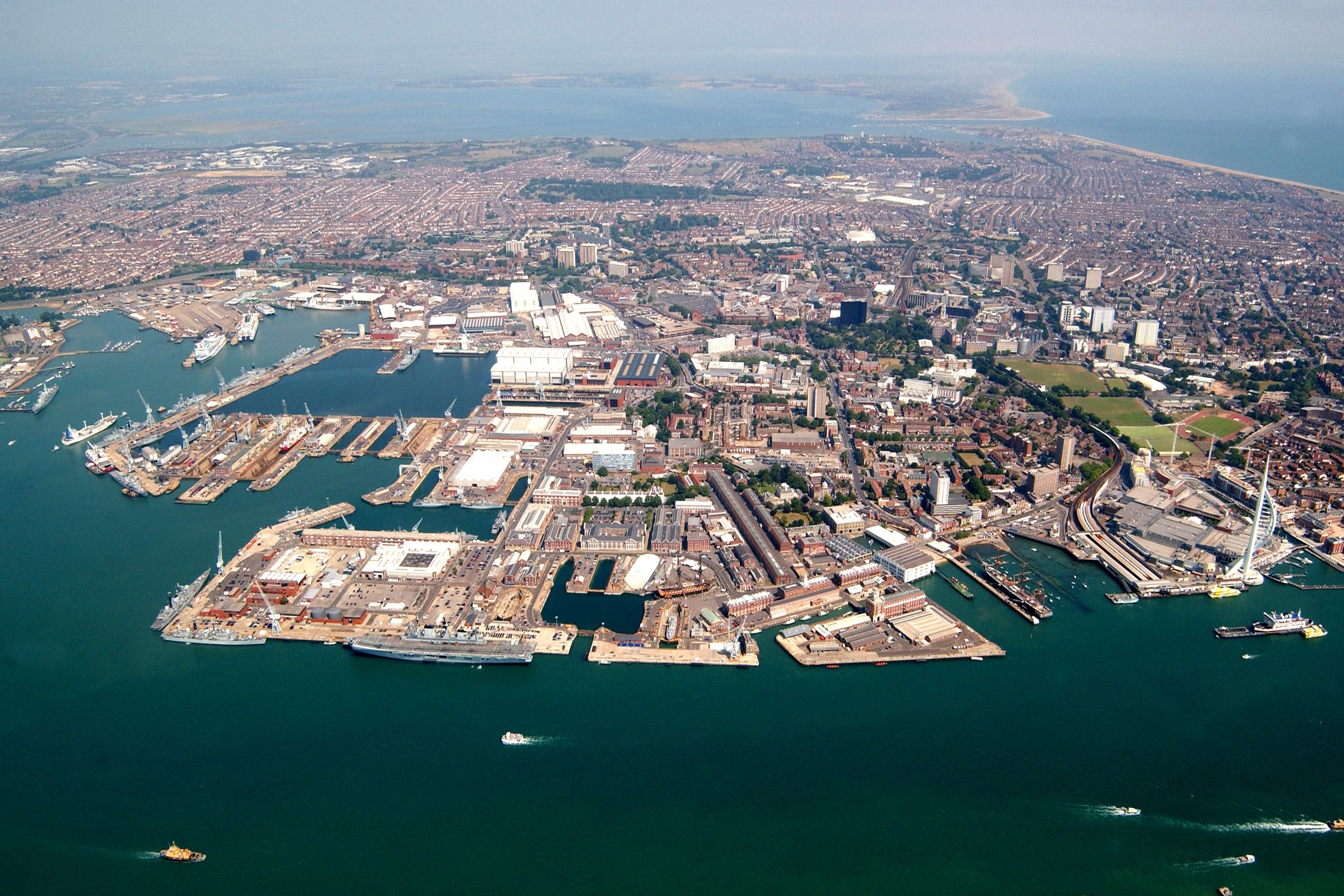
Portsmouth Royal Dockyard, founded 1496, still in service as a Naval Base.

Royal Navy Dockyards (more usually termed Royal Dockyards) were state-owned harbour facilities where ships of the Royal Navy were built, based, repaired and refitted. Until the mid-19th century the Royal Dockyards were the largest industrial complexes in Britain.

From the reign of Henry VII up until the 1990s, the Royal Navy had a policy of establishing and maintaining its own dockyard facilities (although at the same time, as continues to be the case, it made extensive use of private shipyards, both at home and abroad). Portsmouth was the first Royal Dockyard, dating from the late 15th century; it was followed by Deptford, Woolwich, Chatham and others. By the 18th century, Britain had a string of these state-owned naval dockyards, located not just around the country but across the world; each was sited close to a safe harbour or anchorage used by the fleet. Royal Naval Dockyards were the core naval and military facilities of the four Imperial fortresses - colonies which enabled control of the Atlantic Ocean and its connected seas. The Royal Dockyards had a dual function: ship building and ship maintenance (most yards provided for both but some specialised in one or the other). Over time, they accrued additional on-site facilities for the support, training and accommodation of naval personnel.

For centuries, in this way, the name and concept of a Royal Dockyard was largely synonymous with that of a naval base. In the early 1970s, following the appointment of civilian Dockyard General Managers with cross-departmental authority, and a separation of powers between them and the Dockyard Superintendent (commanding officer), the term 'Naval Base' began to gain currency as an official designation for the latter's domain. 'Royal Dockyard' remained an official designation of the associated shipbuilding/maintenance facilities until 1997, when the last remaining Royal Dockyards (Devonport and Rosyth) were fully privatised.

== Function ==
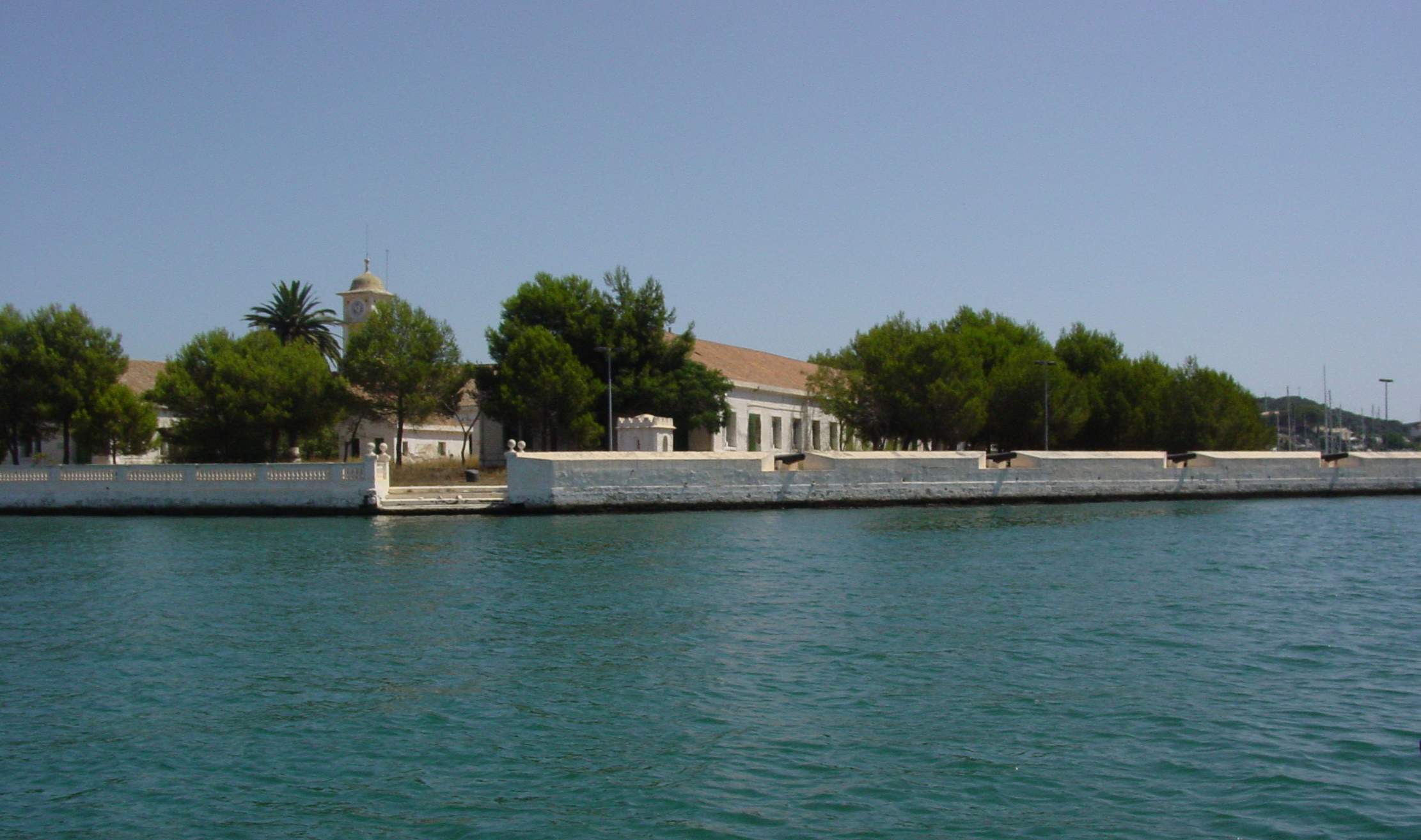
Careening wharf and storehouses built by the Royal Navy in the 1760s, Illa Pinto, Port Mahon, Menorca.

Most Royal Dockyards were built around docks and slips. Traditionally, slipways were used for shipbuilding, and dry docks (also called graving docks) for maintenance; (dry docks were also sometimes used for building, particularly pre-1760 and post-1880). Regular hull maintenance was important: in the Age of Sail, a ship's wooden hull would be comprehensively inspected every 2–3 years, and its copper sheeting replaced every 5. Dry docks were invariably the most expensive component of any dockyard (until the advent of marine nuclear facilities). Where there was no nearby dock available (as was often the case at the overseas yards) ships would sometimes be careened (beached at high tide) to enable necessary work to be done. In the age of sail, wharves and capstan-houses were often built for the purpose of careening at yards with no dock: a system of pulleys and ropes, attached to the masthead, would be used to heel the ship over giving access to the hull.

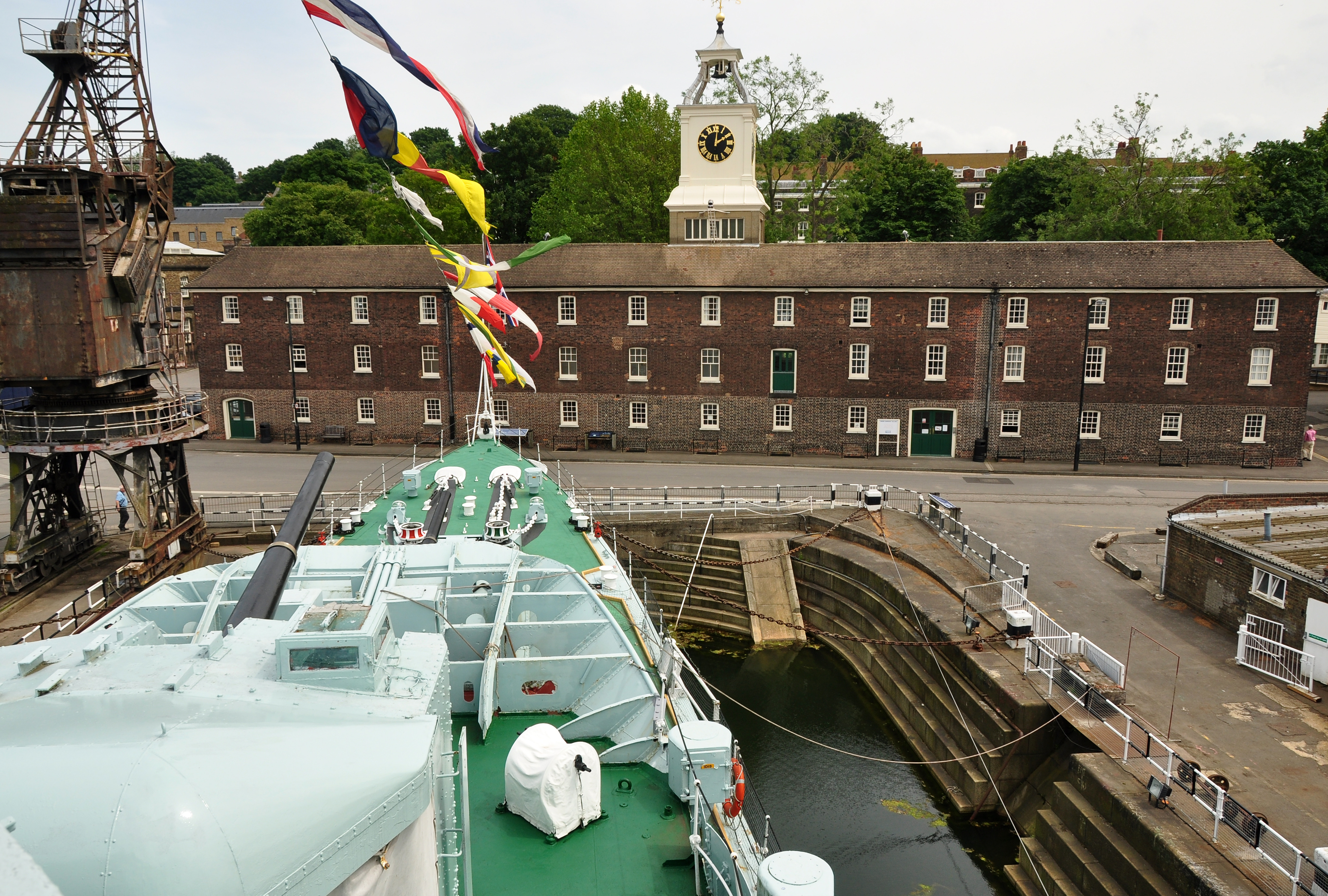
18th-century storehouse, 19th-century dry dock and 20th-century warship preserved at Chatham

In addition to docks and slips, a Royal Dockyard had various specialist buildings on site: storehouses, sail lofts, woodworking sheds, metal shops and forges, roperies (in some cases), pumping stations (for emptying the dry docks), administration blocks and housing for the senior dockyard officers. Wet docks (usually called basins) accommodated ships while they were being fitted out. The number and size of dockyard basins increased dramatically in the steam era. At the same time, large factory complexes, machine-shops and foundries sprung up alongside for the manufacture of engines and other components (including the metal hulls of the ships themselves).

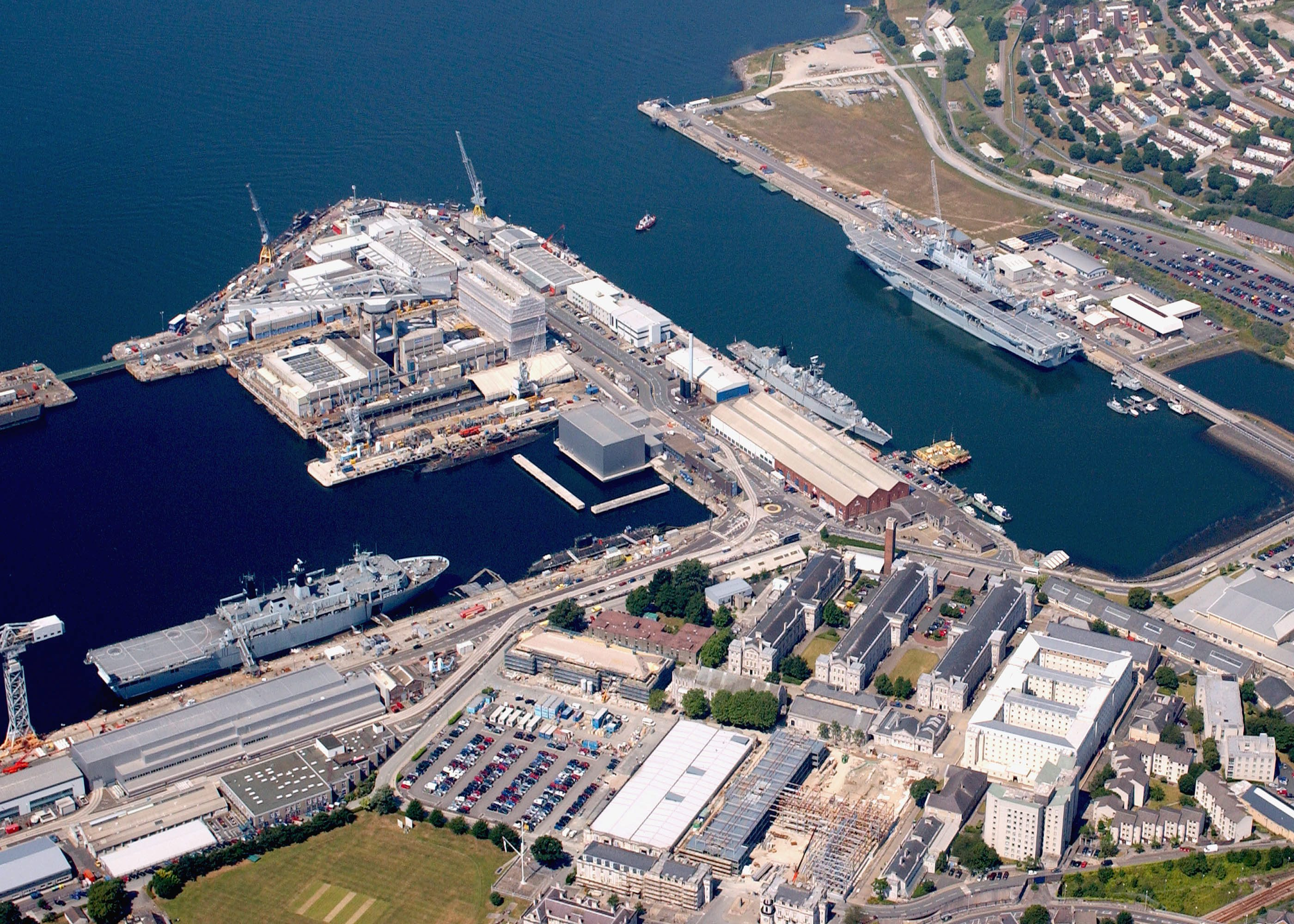
Barracks accommodation alongside No.5 Basin and the former coaling wharf at Devonport

One thing generally absent from the Royal Dockyards (until the 20th century) was the provision of naval barracks. Prior to this time, sailors were not usually quartered ashore at all, they were expected to live on board a ship (the only real exception being at some overseas wharves where accommodation was provided for crews whose ships were being careened). When a ship was decommissioned at the end of a voyage or tour of duty, most of her crew were dismissed or else transferred to new vessels. Alternatively, if a vessel was undergoing refit or repair, her crew was often accommodated on a nearby hulk; a dockyard often had several commissioned hulks moored nearby, serving various purposes and accommodating various personnel, including new recruits. Things began to change when the Admiralty introduced more settled terms of service in 1853; nevertheless, thirty years were to pass before the first shore barrack opened, and a further twenty years before barracks at all three of the major home yards were finally completed. Through the course of the 20th century these barracks, together with their associated training and other facilities, became defining features of each of these dockyards.

In 1985 Parliament was given the following description of the functions of the two then remaining Royal Dockyards: "The services provided by the royal dockyards at Devonport and Rosyth to the Royal Navy fall into five main categories as follows: (a) Refit, repair, maintenance and modernisation of Royal Navy vessels; (b) Overhaul and testing of naval equipments, including those to be returned to the Director General of Stores and Transport (Navy) for stock and subsequent issue to the Royal Navy; (c) Installation and maintenance of machinery and equipment in naval establishments; (d) Provision of utility services to Royal Navy vessels alongside in the naval base and to adjacent naval shore establishments; and (e) manufacture of some items of ships' equipment".

=== Nomenclature ===
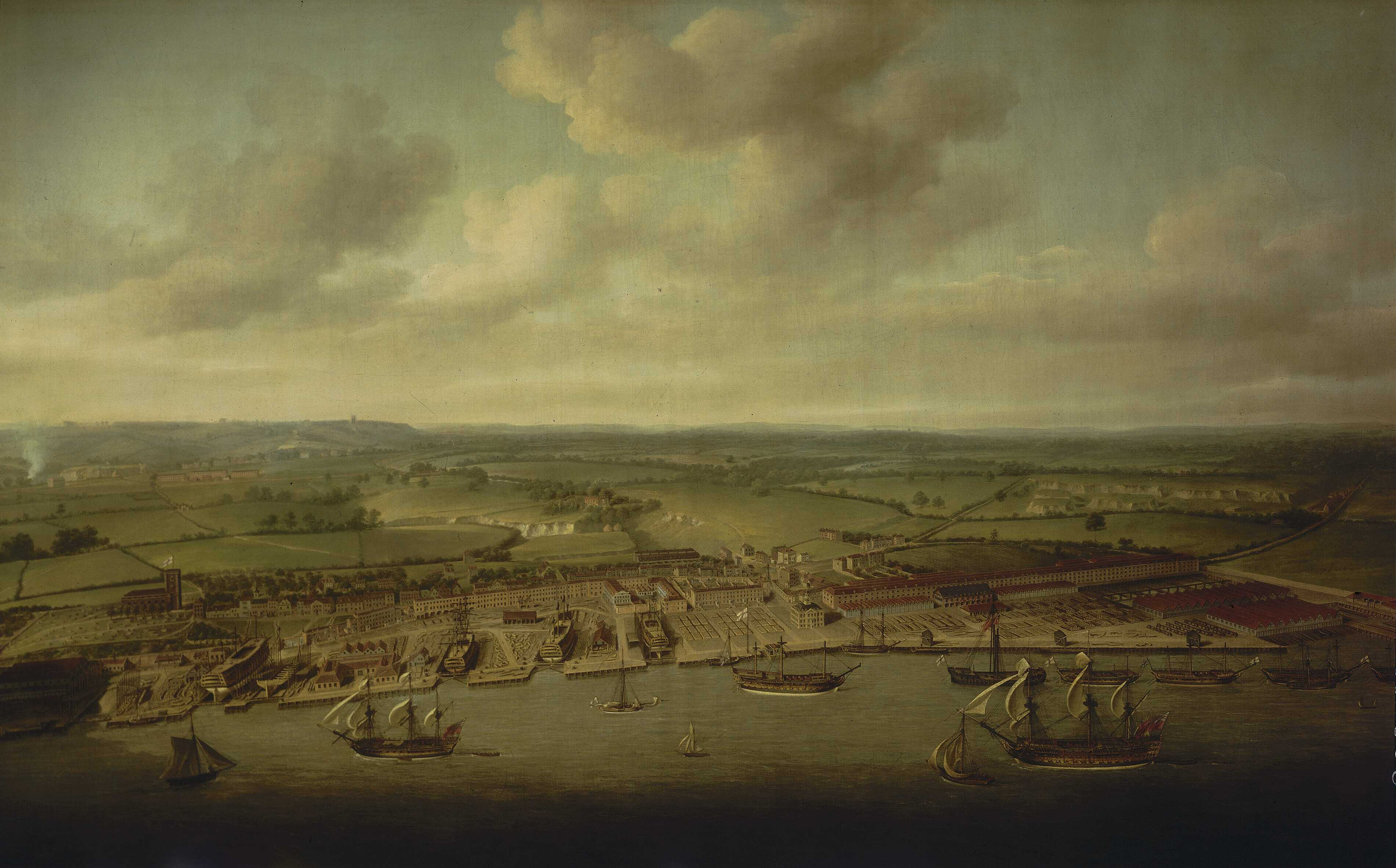
1790 painting of Woolwich Dockyard. Ships under repair and construction are prominently seen on the yard's two docks and three slips; shipbuilding timber is stacked in every available open space across the site.

For a long time, well into the eighteenth century, a Royal Dockyard was often referred to as The King's Yard (or The Queen's Yard, as appropriate). In 1694, Edmund Dummer referred to "His Majesty's new Dock and Yard at Plymouth"; from around that time, HM Dock Yard (or HM Dockyard) increasingly became the official designation. While, as this phrase suggests, the primary meaning of 'Dockyard' is a Yard with a Dock, not all dockyards possessed one; for example, at both Bermuda and Portland dry docks were planned but never built. Where a dock was neither built nor planned (as at Harwich, Deal and several of the overseas yards) the installation was often designated HM Naval Yard rather than 'HM Dockyard' in official publications (though the latter term may have been used informally); they are included in the listings below.

While the term 'Royal Dockyard' ceased in official usage following privatisation, at least one private-sector operator has reinstated it: Babcock International, which in 2011 acquired freehold ownership of the working North Yard at Devonport from the British Ministry of Defence, reverted to calling it Devonport Royal Dockyard.

== Historical overview ==
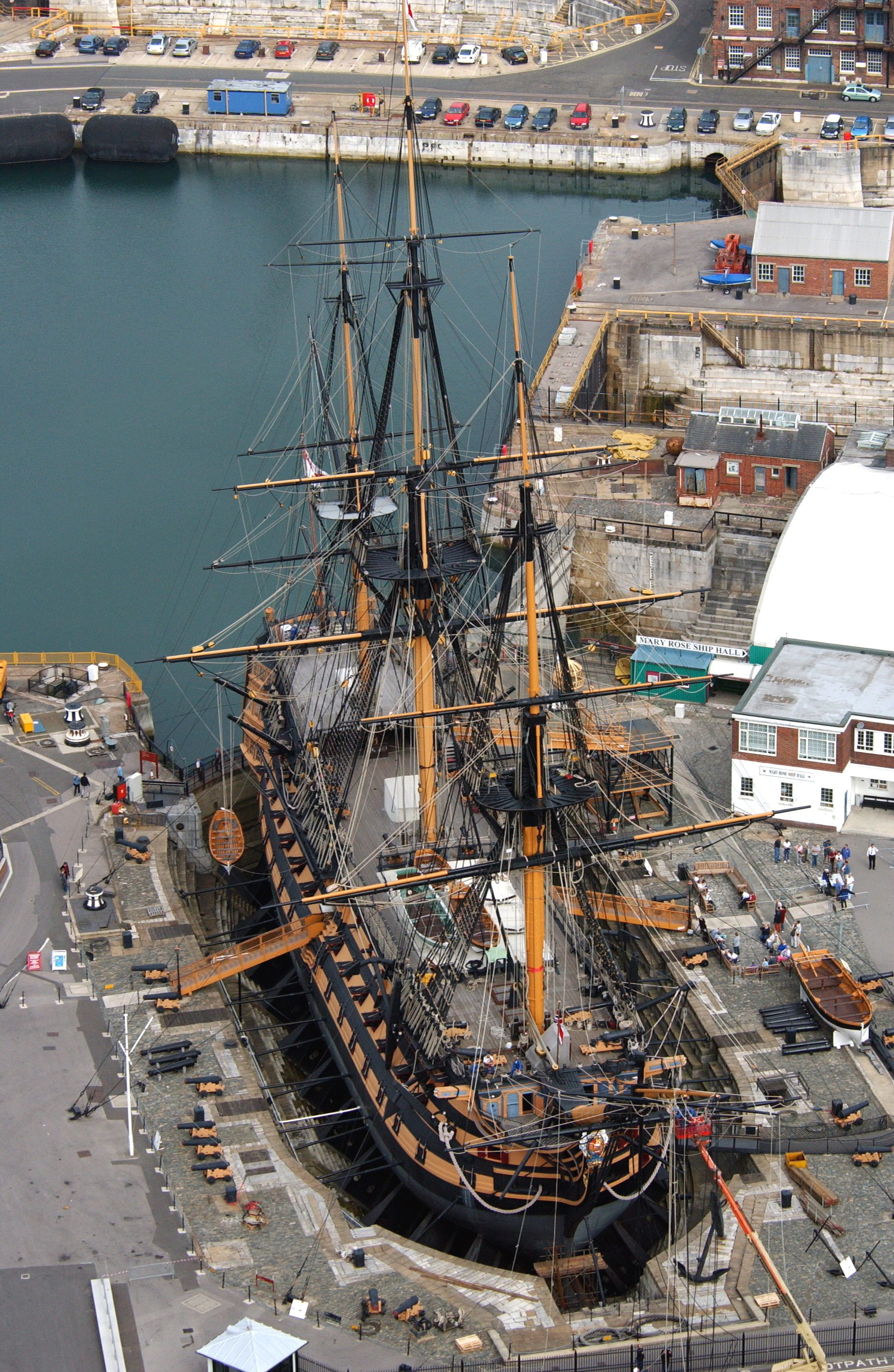
Portsmouth: surviving dry-docks at No. 1 Basin (one of which dates from 1698).

The origins of the Royal Dockyards are closely linked with the permanent establishment of a standing Navy in the early sixteenth century. The beginnings of a yard had already been established at Portsmouth with the building of a dry dock in 1496; but it was on the Thames in the reign of Henry VIII that the Royal Dockyards really began to flourish. Woolwich and Deptford dockyards were both established in the early 1510s (a third yard followed at Erith but this was short-lived as it proved to be vulnerable to flooding). The Thames yards were pre-eminent in the sixteenth century, being conveniently close to the merchants and artisans of London (for shipbuilding and supply purposes) as well as to the Armouries of the Tower of London. They were also just along the river from Henry's palace at Greenwich. As time went on, though, they suffered from the silting of the river and the constraints of their sites.

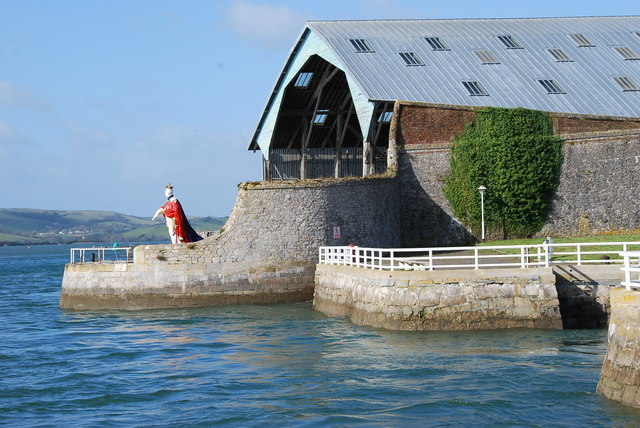
Covered slip no. 1, Devonport: the only complete surviving eighteenth-century slip on a Royal Dockyard.

By the mid-seventeenth century, Chatham (established 1567) had overtaken them to become the largest of the yards. Together with new Yards at Harwich and Sheerness, Chatham was well-placed to serve the Navy in the Dutch Wars that followed. Apart from Harwich (which closed in 1713), all the yards remained busy into the eighteenth century – including Portsmouth (which, after a period of dormancy, had now begun to grow again). In 1690, Portsmouth had been joined on the south coast by a new Royal Dockyard at Plymouth; a hundred years later, as Britain renewed its enmity with France, these two yards gained new prominence and pre-eminence.

Furthermore, Royal Dockyards began to be opened in some of Britain's colonial ports, to service the fleet overseas. Yards were opened in Jamaica (as early as 1675), Antigua (1725), Gibraltar (1704), Canada (Halifax, 1759) and several other locations. Following the loss of the thirteen North American continental colonies that formed the United States of America in 1783, Bermuda assumed a new importance as the only remaining British port between the Maritimes and the Floridas (where the Spanish Government allowed Britain to retain a naval base; once the United States took possession of Florida, Bermuda was the only British port remaining between the Maritimes and the British West Indies, being somewhat nearer Nova Scotia). Being more defensible than Halifax, Nova Scotia, and in a position to command the American seaboard (the nearest landfall being Cape Hatteras at 640 miles), the Admiralty began buying land at Bermuda's West End in 1795 for the development of what would become the main base, dockyard and headquarters for the North America and West Indies Station until United States Navy control of the region under the North Atlantic Treaty Organization led to HMD Bermuda being reduced to a naval base from 1951 until its final closure (as HMNB Bermuda) in 1995 (and to the abolishment of the America and West Indies Station in 1956).

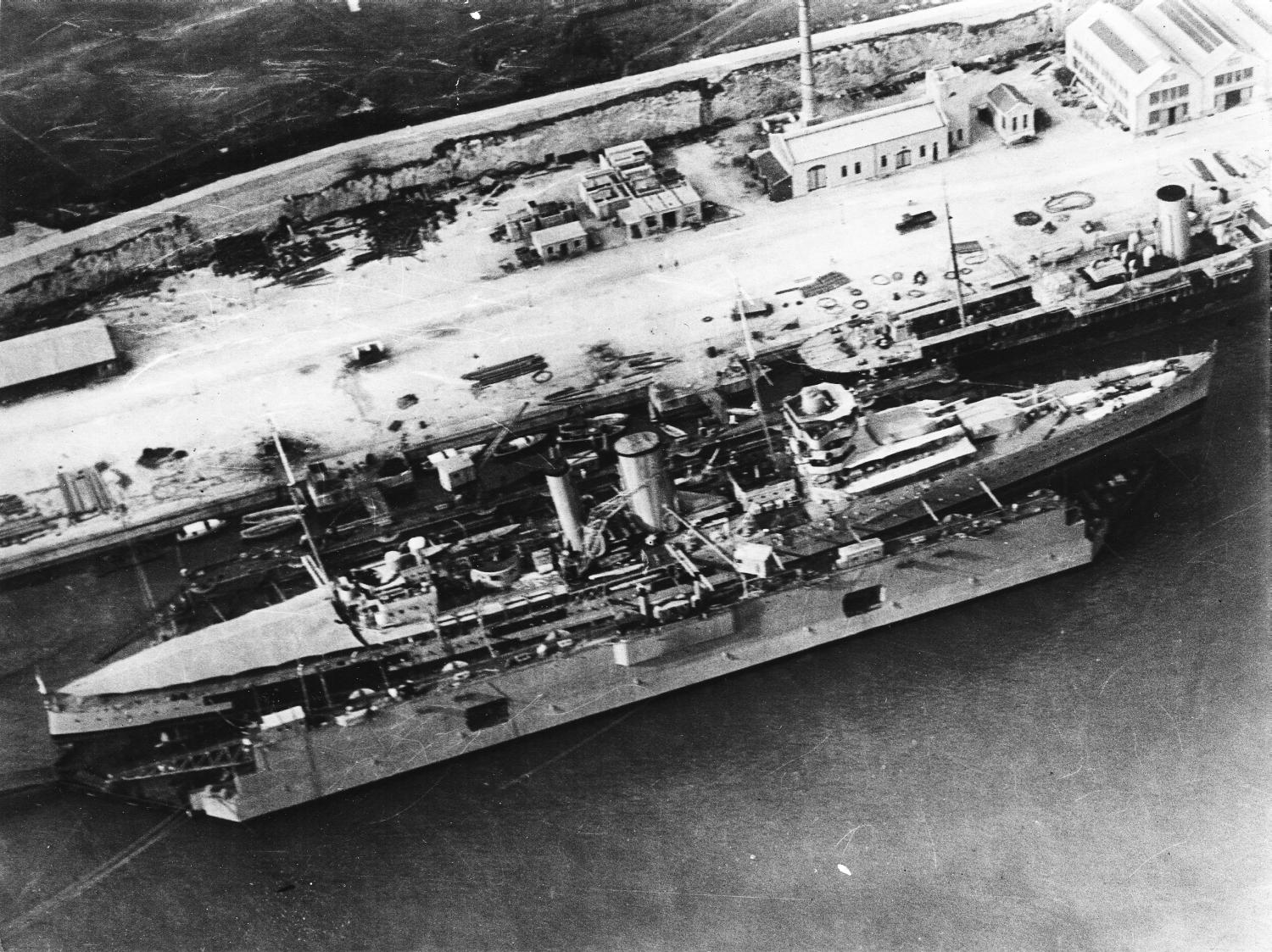
HMS York in Admiralty Floating Dock No. 1 at HMD Bermuda in 1934

In the wake of the Seven Years' War a large-scale programme of expansion and rebuilding was undertaken at the three largest home yards (Chatham, Plymouth and Portsmouth). These highly significant works (involving land reclamation and excavation, as well as new docks and slips and buildings of every kind) lasted from 1765 to 1808, and were followed by a comprehensive rebuilding of the Yard at Sheerness (1815–23).

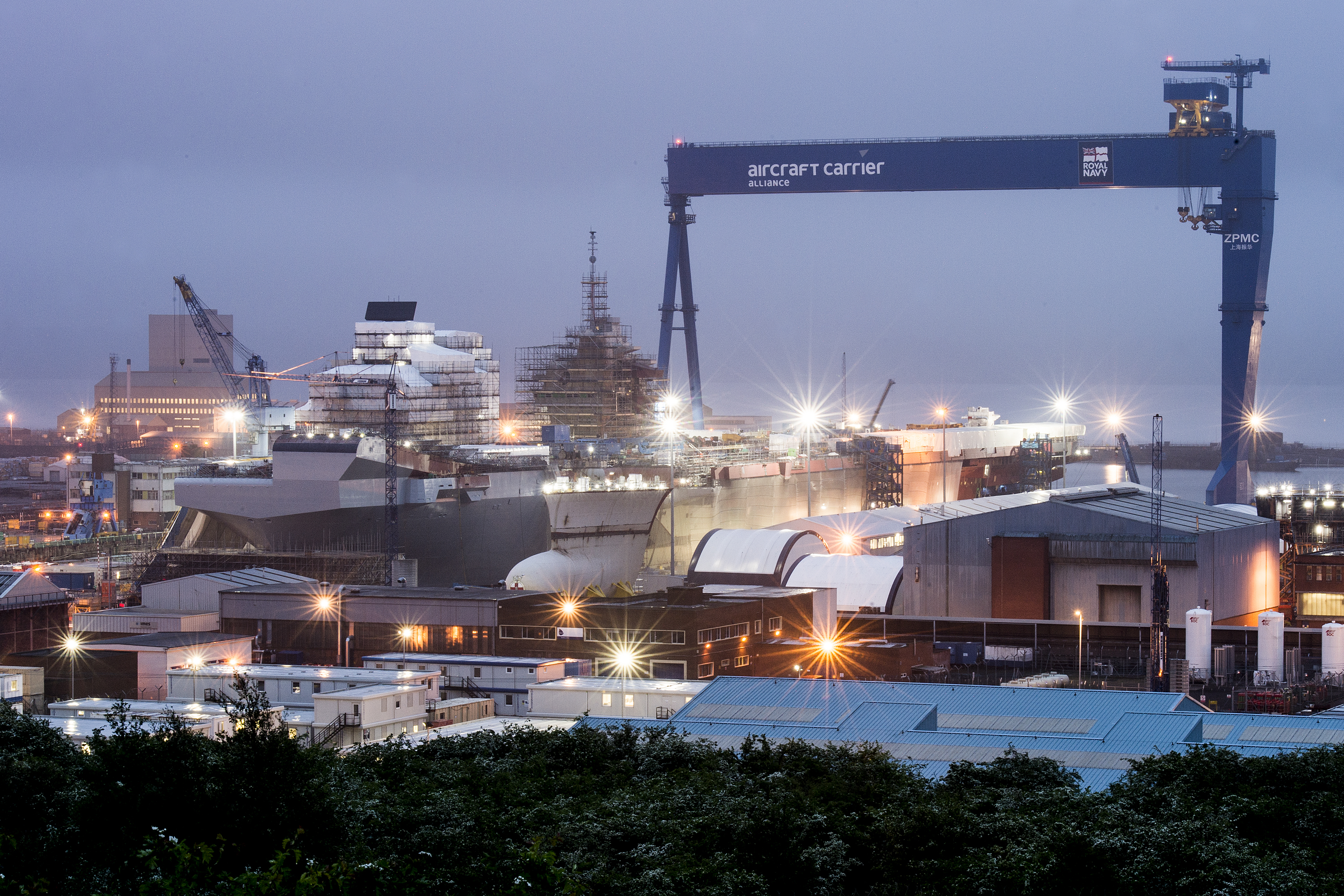
HMS Queen Elizabeth and Prince of Wales under construction at Rosyth, 2013.

Through the Napoleonic Wars all the home yards were kept very busy, and a new shipbuilding yard was established at Pembroke in 1815. Before very long, new developments in shipbuilding, materials and propulsion prompted changes at the Dockyards. Construction of marine steam engines was initially focused at Woolwich, but massive expansion soon followed at Portsmouth, Plymouth and Chatham. Portland Harbour was built by the Admiralty in the mid-19th century to help protect ships taking coal on board; because of its key position, midway between Devonport and Portsmouth in the English Channel, Portland was developed as a maintenance yard. A new maintenance yard was also opened on Haulbowline Island in Cork Harbour. Meanwhile, the Thames-side yards, Woolwich and Deptford, could no longer compete, and they finally closed in 1869.

The massive naval rebuilding programme prior to the First World War saw activity across all the yards, and a new building yard opened at Rosyth. In contrast, the post-war period saw the closure of Pembroke and Rosyth, and the handover of Haulbowline to the new Irish government – though the closures were reversed with the return of war in 1939. A series of closures followed the war: Pembroke in 1947, Portland and Sheerness in 1959/60, then Chatham and Gibraltar (the last remaining overseas yard) in 1984. At the same time, Portsmouth's Royal Dockyard was downgraded and renamed a Fleet Maintenance and Repair Organisation (FMRO). In 1987 the remaining Royal Dockyards (Devonport and Rosyth) were part-privatised, becoming government-owned, contractor-run facilities (run by Devonport Management Limited and Babcock Thorn, respectively); full privatisation followed ten years later (1997). The following year Portsmouth's FMRO was sold to Fleet Support Limited. As of 2019, all three (along with other privately owned shipyards) continue in operation, to varying degrees, as locations for building (Rosyth) and maintaining ships and submarines of the Royal Navy.

== Organisation ==
=== Senior personnel ===
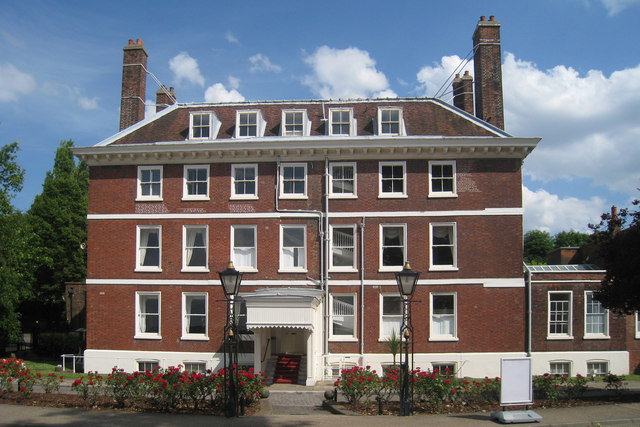
Commissioner's House, Chatham (1703: the oldest intact building in any Royal Dockyard).

Management of the yards was in the hands of the Navy Board until 1832. The Navy Board was represented in each yard by a resident commissioner (though Woolwich and Deptford, being close to the City of London, were for some time overseen directly by the Navy Board). The resident commissioners had wide-ranging powers enabling them to act in the name of the board (particularly in an emergency); however, until 1806 they did not have direct authority over the principal officers of the yard (who were answerable directly to the board). This could often be a source of tension, as everyone sought to guard their own autonomy.

The principal officers varied over time, but generally included:

- the Master-Shipwright (in charge of shipbuilding, ship-repair/-maintenance and management of the associated workforce)
- the Master Attendant (in charge of launching and docking ships, of ships "in Ordinary" at the yard, and of ship movements around the harbour)
- the Storekeeper (in charge of receiving, maintaining and issuing items in storage)
- the Clerk of the Cheque (in charge of pay, personnel and certain transactions)
- the Clerk of the Survey (in charge of maintaining a regular account of equipment and the transfer of goods)

(In practice there was a deliberate overlap of responsibilities among the last three officials listed above, as a precaution against embezzlement).

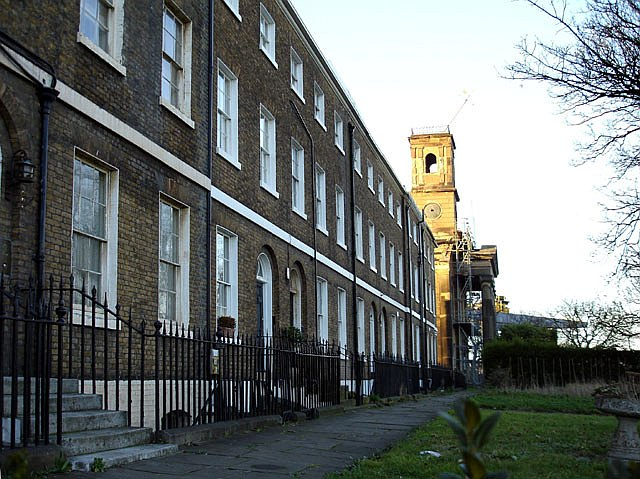
The Principal Officers of a Dockyard were customarily housed in a terrace of houses, as seen here at Sheerness

The next tier of officers included the Masters of particular areas of activity, the Master-Caulker, Master-Ropeworker, Master-Boatbuilder, Master-Mastmaker.

In dockyards where there was a ropewalk (viz Woolwich, Chatham, Portsmouth and Plymouth) there was an additional officer, the Clerk of the Ropeway, who had a degree of autonomy, mustering his own personnel and managing his own raw materials.

Ships in commission (and along with them the majority of Naval personnel) were not under the authority of the Navy Board but rather of the Admiralty, which meant that they did not answer to any of the above officers, but rather to the Port Admiral.

==== After 1832 ====
With the abolition of the Navy Board in 1832, the Admiralty took over the dockyards and the commissioners were replaced by Admiral-Superintendents.

The Clerk of the Survey post had been abolished in 1822. The office of Clerk of the Cheque was likewise abolished in 1830 (its duties reverting to the Storekeeper), but then revived as the Cashier's Department in 1865.

With the development of steam technology in the 1840s came the senior Dockyard appointment of Chief Engineer.

In 1875, the Master-Shipwrights were renamed Chief Constructors (later styled Manager, Constructive Department or MCD).

In the latter half of the 19th century, those appointed as Master Attendants (in common with their namesakes the sailing Masters) began to be commissioned. They began to be given the rank and appointment of "Staff Captain (Dockyard)" (modified in 1903 to "Captain of the Dockyard"). In several instances, the appointment of Master Attendant or Captain of the Dockyard was held in common with that of King's or Queen's Harbour Master.

For much of the twentieth century, the principal Dockyard departments were overseen by:

- Captain of the Dockyard
- Manager, Constructive Department (MCD)
- Manager, Engineering Department (MED)
- Senior Electrical Engineer (SEE)
- Senior Naval Stores Officer (SNSO)

=== Associated establishments ===
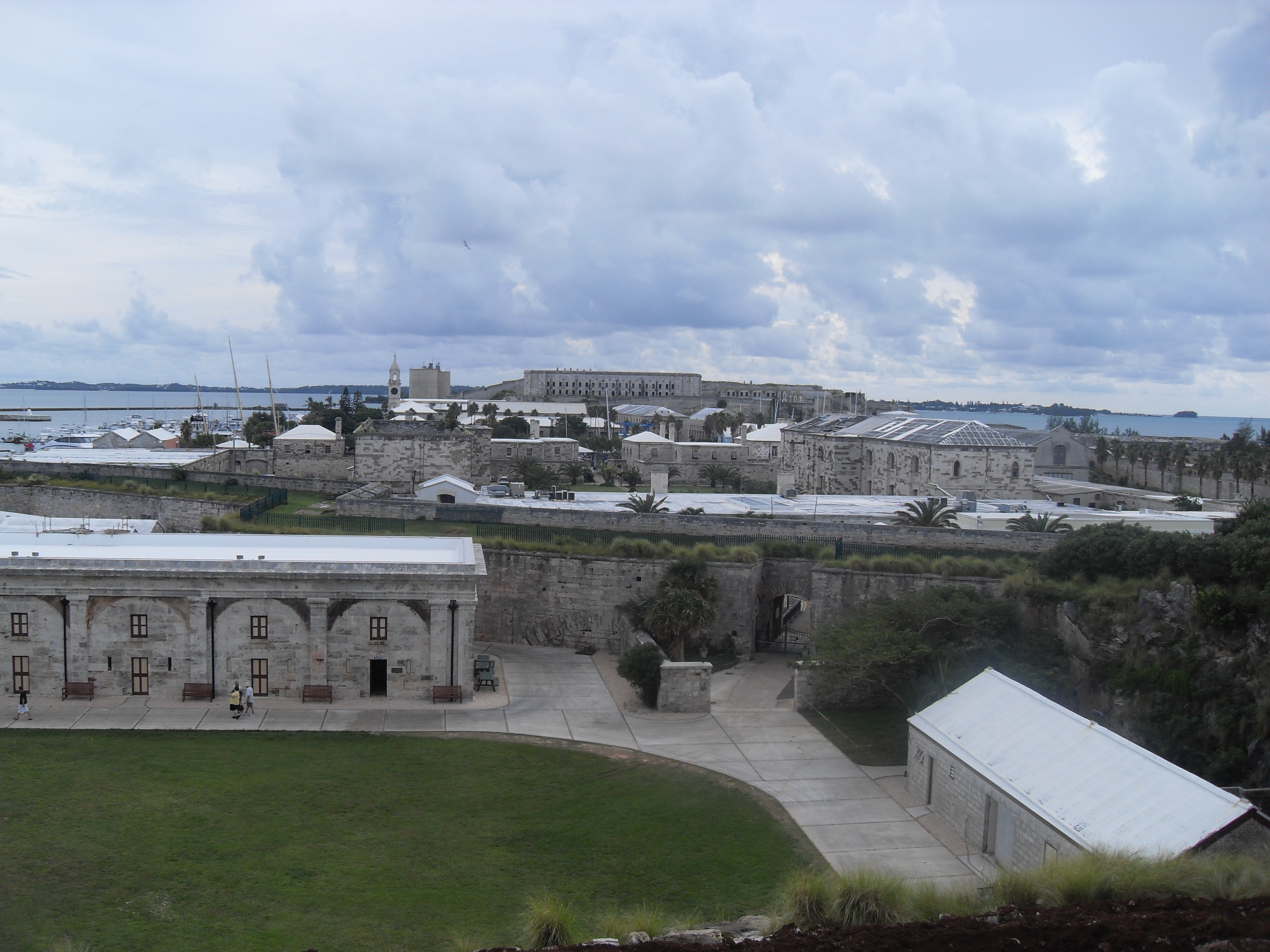
View from the Commissioner's house in Bermuda: Ordnance Yard (in the Keep), Victualling Yard, Dockyard, Casemates Barracks and Upper Ordnance Yard.

Ships' ordnance (guns, weapons and ammunition) was provided independently by the Board of Ordnance, which set up its own Ordnance Yards alongside several of the Royal Dockyards both at home and abroad. Similarly, the Victualling Board established Victualling Yards in several Dockyard locations, which furnished warships with their provisions of food, beer and rum. In the mid-eighteenth century the Sick and Hurt Board established Naval Hospitals in the vicinity of Plymouth Dock and Portsmouth; by the mid-nineteenth century there were Royal Naval Hospitals close to most of the major and minor Naval Dockyards in Britain, in addition to several of them overseas (the oldest dating from the early 1700s). As the age of steam eclipsed the Age of Sail, Coaling Yards were established alongside several yards, and at strategic points around the globe.

In addition to naval personnel and civilian workers, there were substantial numbers of military quartered in the vicinity of the Royal Dockyards. These were there to ensure the defence of the yard and its ships. From the 1750s, naval yards in Britain were surrounded by 'lines' (fortifications) with barracks provided for the soldiers manning them. A century later these 'lines' were superseded by networks of Palmerston Forts. Overseas yards also usually had some fort or similar structure provided and manned nearby. Moreover, the Royal Marines, from the time of the Corps' establishment in the mid-18th century, were primarily based in the dockyard towns of Plymouth, Portsmouth and Chatham (and later also in Woolwich and Deal) where their barracks were conveniently placed for duties on board ship or indeed in the Dockyard itself.

== United Kingdom dockyards ==
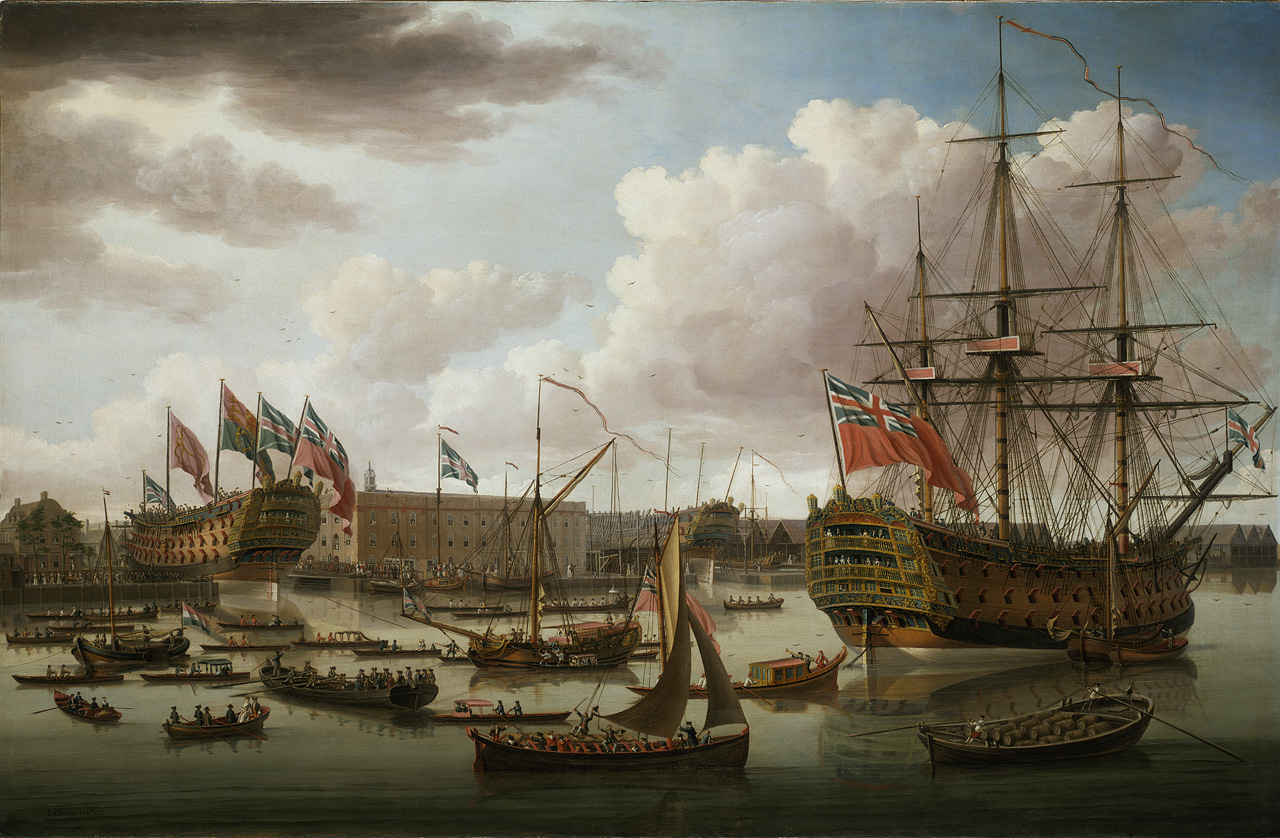
A lively depiction of Deptford Dockyard in the mid-eighteenth century (John Cleveley the Elder, 1755).

Royal Dockyards were established in Britain and Ireland as follows (in chronological order, with date of establishment):

=== 15th century ===
- Portsmouth Dockyard (1496) Rose to prominence during the wars with France, late 18th century. Expanded significantly in the 19th century with new facilities for steam engineering and ironclad shipbuilding. Privatised 1993. In November 2013 the operator BAE Systems announced that it was closing its shipbuilding facility at Portsmouth; part of the shipyard will remain open for repair/maintenance.

=== 16th century ===
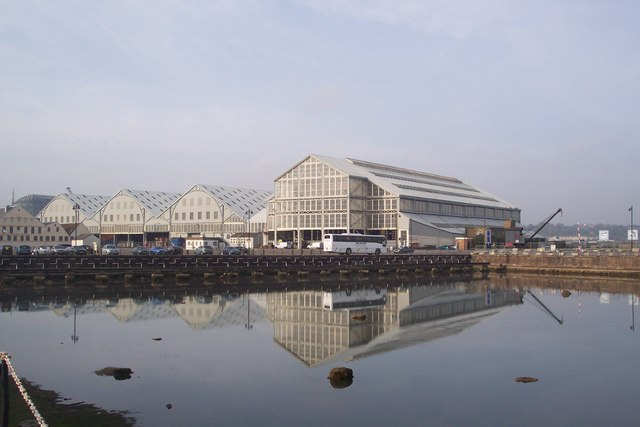
Shipbuilding slips at Chatham

- Woolwich Dockyard (1512) Important shipbuilding centre, 16th–17th centuries. Became a specialist steam yard 1831. Closed 1869.
- Erith Dockyard (1512) Erith Dockyard was used as an advance base for routine maintenance before ships were transferred to Deptford Dockyard. It closed due to persistent flooding in 1521. However, according to naval historian Nicholas A. M. Rodger although Erith dockyard closed it was an important centre of naval administration of the English Navy from 1514 into the 1540s.
- Deptford Dockyard (1513) Important shipbuilding centre, 16th-17th centuries. Experimental yard for new technology, early 19th century. Closed 1869. (The adjacent victualling yard, which supplied the Thames and Medway yards, remained open for a further 98 years.)
- Chatham Dockyard (1567) The leading Royal Dockyard during the 16th–17th centuries, when the Fleet was principally based in and around the River Medway. Began to suffer from silting in the 18th century, but remained active. During the 19th century, other more accessible yards led on fleet repairs and maintenance, while Chatham focused more on shipbuilding. The following century, it specialised in building submarines. In 1960 the adjacent Royal Navy barracks and facilities were closed; the Dockyard itself closed in 1984. (Today the site is preserved as Chatham Historic Dockyard.)

=== 17th century ===
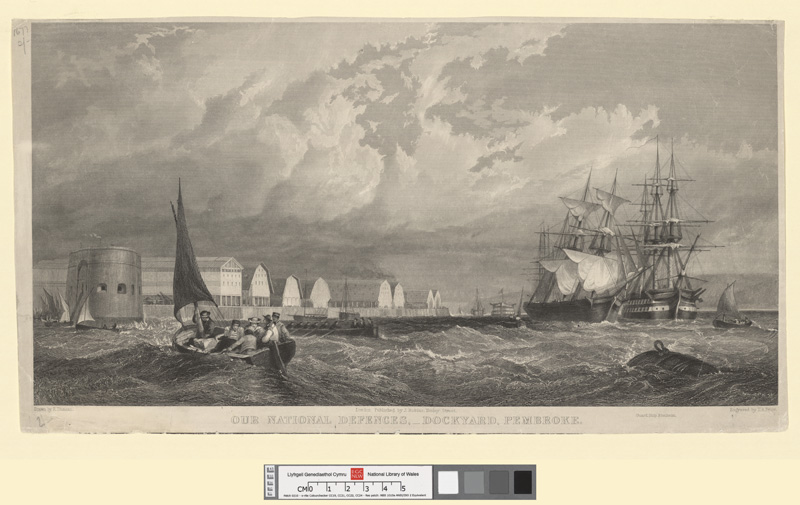
Royal Navy Dockyard, Pembroke, 1860

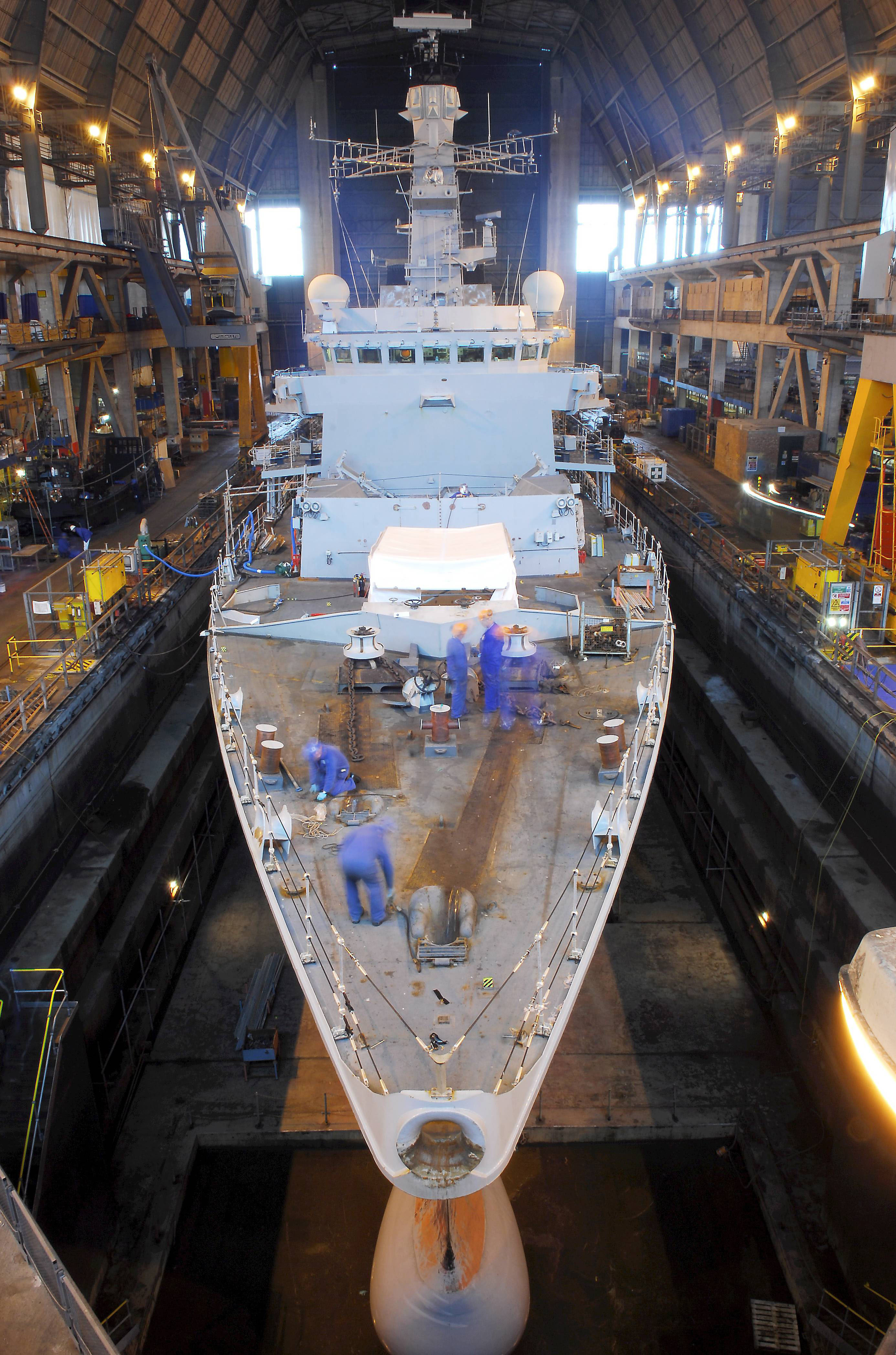
HMS Westminster undergoing refit in a covered dry-dock at Devonport, 2009.

- Kinsale Dockyard (1647) Served as a supply and repair base (with some evidence of shipbuilding) for the Royal Navy's Irish Squadron, and later as a cruiser base. Closed by 1812, its facilities having relocated to Haulbowline (see below).
- Harwich Dockyard (1652) Active during the Anglo-Dutch Wars; closed 1713 (a small Naval yard remained on site, with refit/stores facilities, until 1829.)
- Sheerness Dockyard (1665) Originally built for storing and refitting; for much of its history served as a support yard for Chatham. Shipbuilding began in 1720 (mostly smaller ships). Entire dockyard rebuilt to a single design by John Rennie Jnr in 1815–26. Closed 1960 (site taken over as a commercial port).
- Deal Naval Yard (1672) Provided basic repair and supply facilities for ships at anchor nearby in the Downs (albeit without the possibility of ships approaching the shore). Closed in 1864.
- Plymouth Dockyard (1690) Pre-eminent, alongside Portsmouth, during the wars with France (1793 onwards). Known as Devonport since 1843. Significant expansion for steam engineering, 1844–53 and 1896–1907. Shipbuilding ceased in 1971, but the Yard remains active as a maintenance and repair facility.

=== 19th century ===
- Pembroke Dockyard (1815) Unlike all the previous yards, Pembroke was built purely for shipbuilding rather than for repair and maintenance. It was successor to a yard at Milford Haven leased by the Navy Board for shipbuilding since the late 18th century. Active through to the end of World War One, the yard was closed temporarily in 1923, reopened in the 1930s and closed permanently in 1947. (A small naval base remained on the site until 2008.)
- Portland Dockyard (1845) Previously in use as an anchorage, a yard was established here to provide coal for the new steam-powered ships of the Navy. In the 1850s there were plans for dry-docks and building slips, but these were not carried through. Very active through two World Wars, the Dockyard closed in 1959; site taken over as a commercial port. (Adjacent Naval Base and RN Air Station closed in 1995–99).

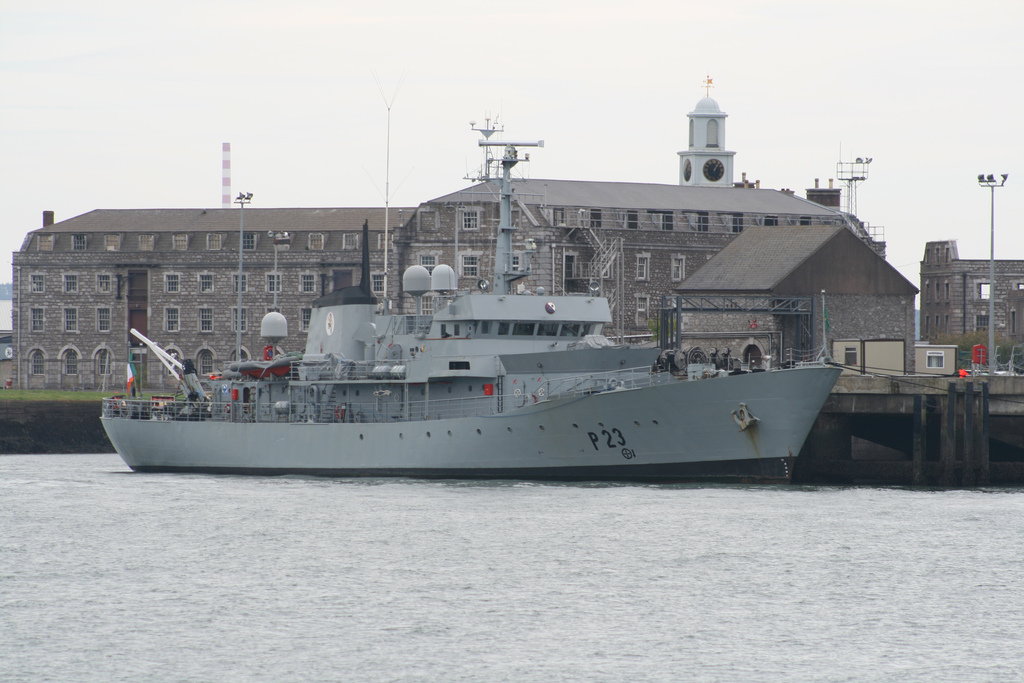
Naval Storehouses (c.1820) at Haulbowline (now Republic of Ireland)

- Haulbowline Dockyard (1869) Haulbowline Island in Cork Harbour was established as a Naval Victualling Yard in 1811 (in succession to an earlier base at Kinsale further along the coast). It was extended in 1869 in order to create a sizeable Royal Navy Dockyard, specialising in ship repair and maintenance. In 1923 the island was handed over to the Irish government; Haulbowline remains the principal Naval base of the Republic of Ireland. A steelworks was established on the site of the Dockyard in 1938.

=== 20th century ===
- Rosyth Dockyard (1909) Built with a strategic view to countering the threat from Germany. Closed after World War One, reopened 1939, and has remained open since. Privatized in 1993, but continues to build and maintain Britain's warships.
- Dover Dockyard (1913) In 1847 the government began construction on Dover's Admiralty Pier, envisaged as forming the western arm of a protected haven. This project was only completed after work began on the eastern pier in 1898; the Admiralty Harbour was formally opened in 1909. During both World Wars Dover served as a ship repair station and was listed as a Naval Dockyard.
- Invergordon Dockyard (1916) Fully staffed dockyard through World War I, serving the fleet's anchorage in Cromarty Firth. A 2.25 acres (0.91 ha) floating dry dock was towed here from Portsmouth in 1914 and was in use for the duration of the war. Closed after the war, but the Navy maintained the site as an oiling station during World War II, finally withdrawing in 1993.
- Scapa Flow Dockyard (1939) Established at Lyness Naval Base and operational through World War II.

=== Other ===
Other, minor yards (with some permanent staff and basic repair/storage facilities) were established in a number of locations over time, usually to serve a nearby anchorage used by Naval vessels. For example, during 18th century a small supply base was maintained at Leith, for ships on Leith Station; but there was no strategic impetus to develop it into a full-blown Dockyard. Similar bases were established during the Napoleonic Wars at Falmouth (for vessels in Carrick Roads) and Great Yarmouth (for vessels in Yarmouth Roads); but both were relatively small-scale and short-lived.

A different (and, within the UK, unique) establishment was Haslar Gunboat Yard. Gunboats were small, shallow-draft vessels, developed after the Crimean War, which benefitted from being stored ashore rather than left afloat, to help preserve their light wooden hulls. From 1856 Haslar provided the means to house, launch and haul them ashore by means of a steam-driven traverse system. Overseen by a Master-Shipwright, the Yard stayed in use until 1906, after which it remained in Naval hands as a base for Coastal Forces craft until 1973.

== Overseas dockyards ==
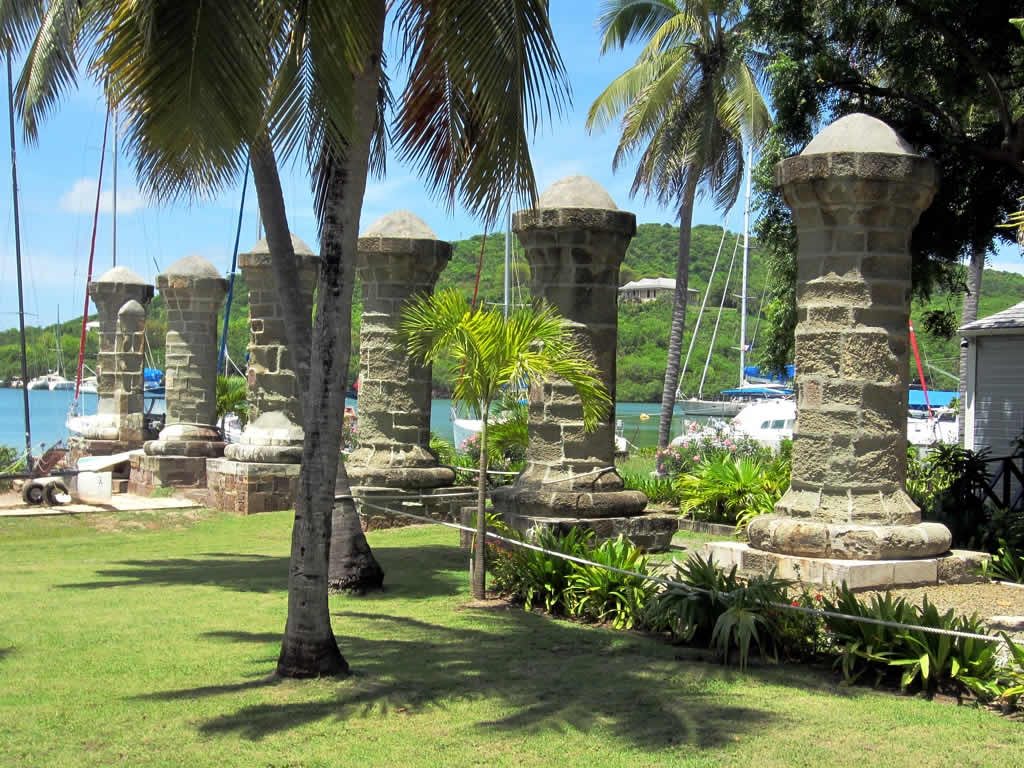
Part of Nelson's Dockyard in Antigua

=== Caribbean ===
In 1728 Antigua Naval Dockyard was established at English Harbour which had been used by the Navy since 1671 as a place for shelter and maintenance. A number of buildings were constructed, and several remain (mostly from the 1780s). It served as Admiral Nelson's base in the West Indies during the Napoleonic Wars. The yard closed in 1882 and left abandoned until 1951, but has since been restored and is open to the public as a cultural centre and public marina called Nelson's Dockyard.

Jamaica (1675) Jamaica Dockyard A naval official was stationed in Port Royal from the seventeenth century, and naval vessels were careened there for maintenance from that time. Following the Port Royal earthquake of 1692, and a succession of damaging hurricanes, a concerted attempt was made from 1729 to relocate Jamaica's naval yard to Port Antonio, an unsettled bay on the opposite side of the island; the climate there was not agreeable, however, there were high levels of sickness and the Navy abandoned Port Antonio in 1749. From 1735 wharves, storehouses and other structures were built anew at Port Royal, and these were updated through the nineteenth century. The yard closed in 1905. Now Naval Heritage Center.

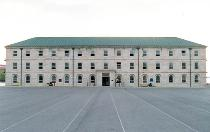
Canada: former Naval Storehouse (c.1815), Kingston, Ontario

=== British North America and North Atlantic ===
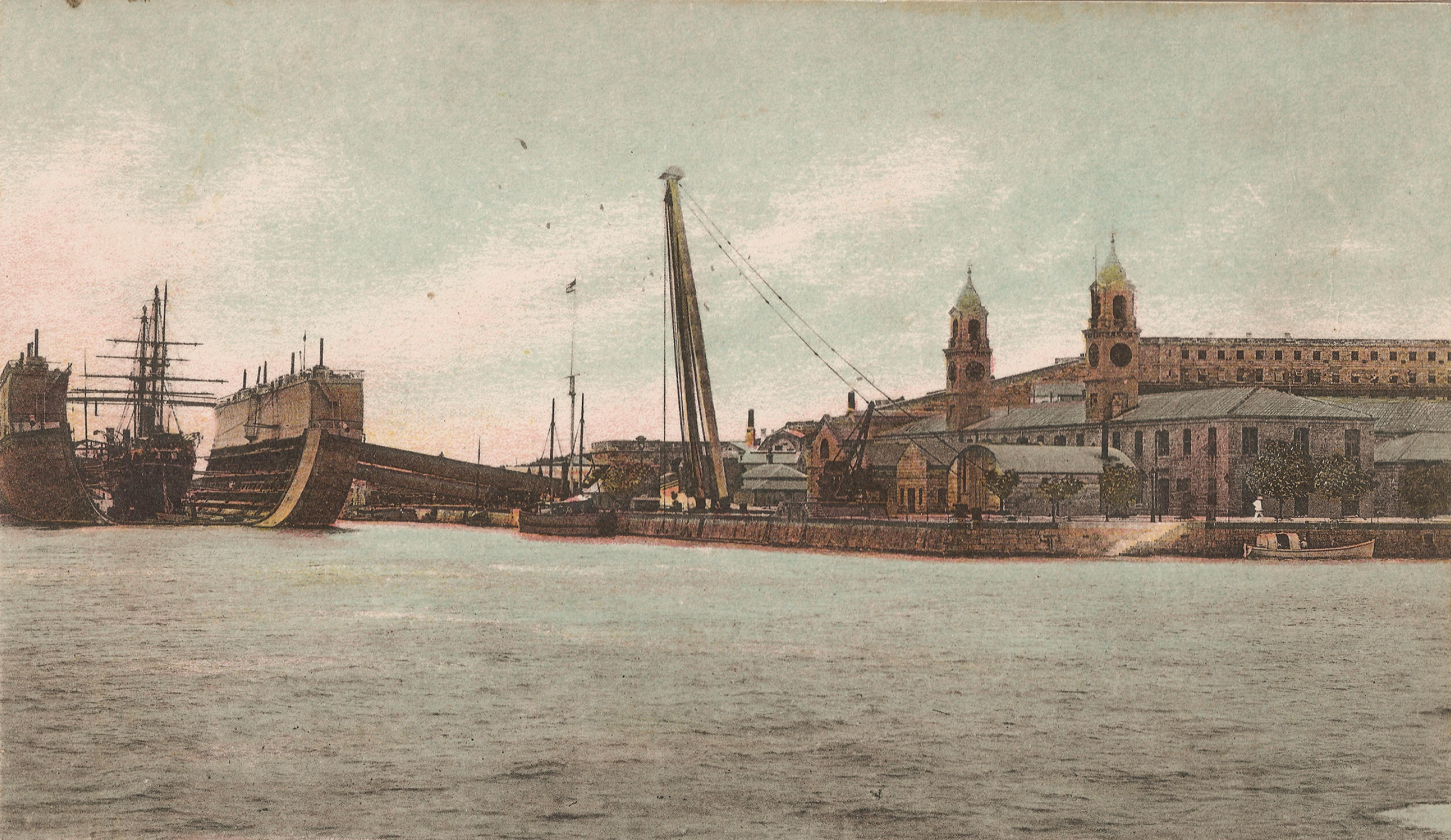
The floating dry dock Bermuda, sheerlegs, Storehouse, and Casemates Barracks at HM Dockyard Bermuda

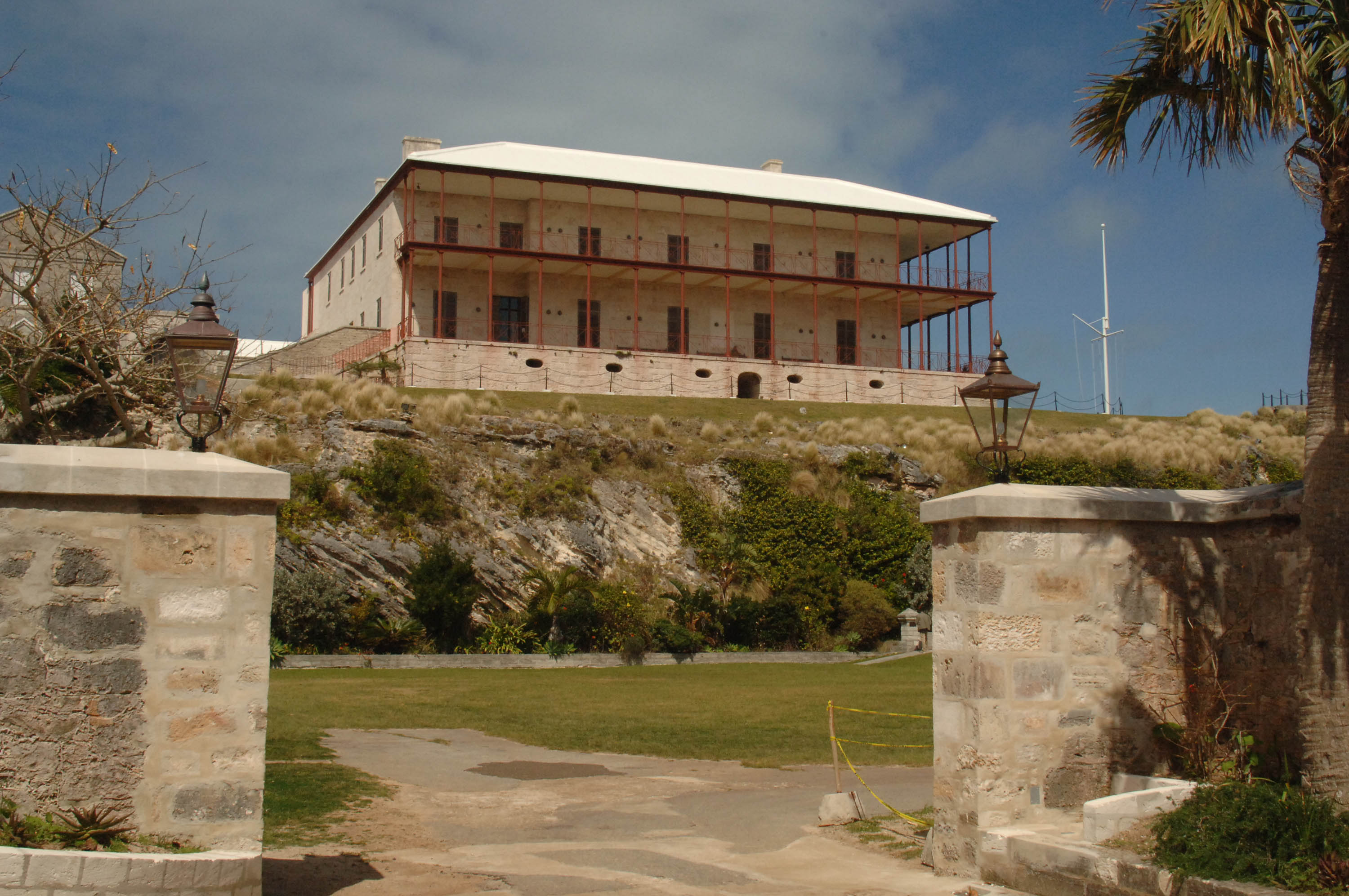
Dockyard Commissioner's House in Bermuda (1823–31)

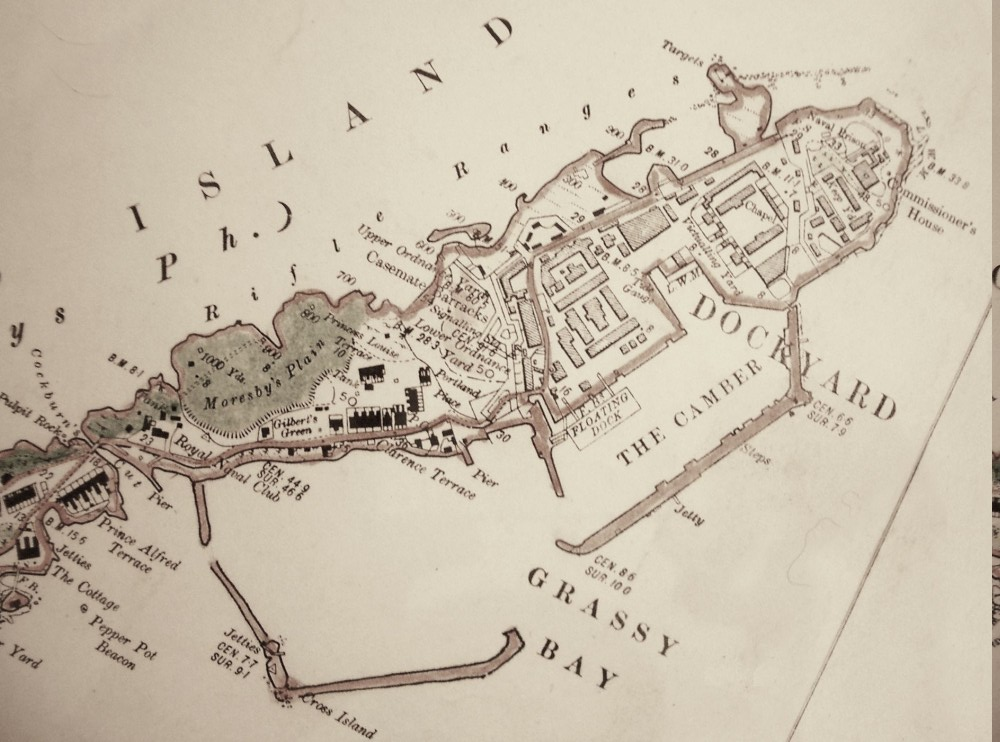
HMD Bermuda circa 1899, showing the new South Yard under construction (left) and the old fortified North Yard (right)

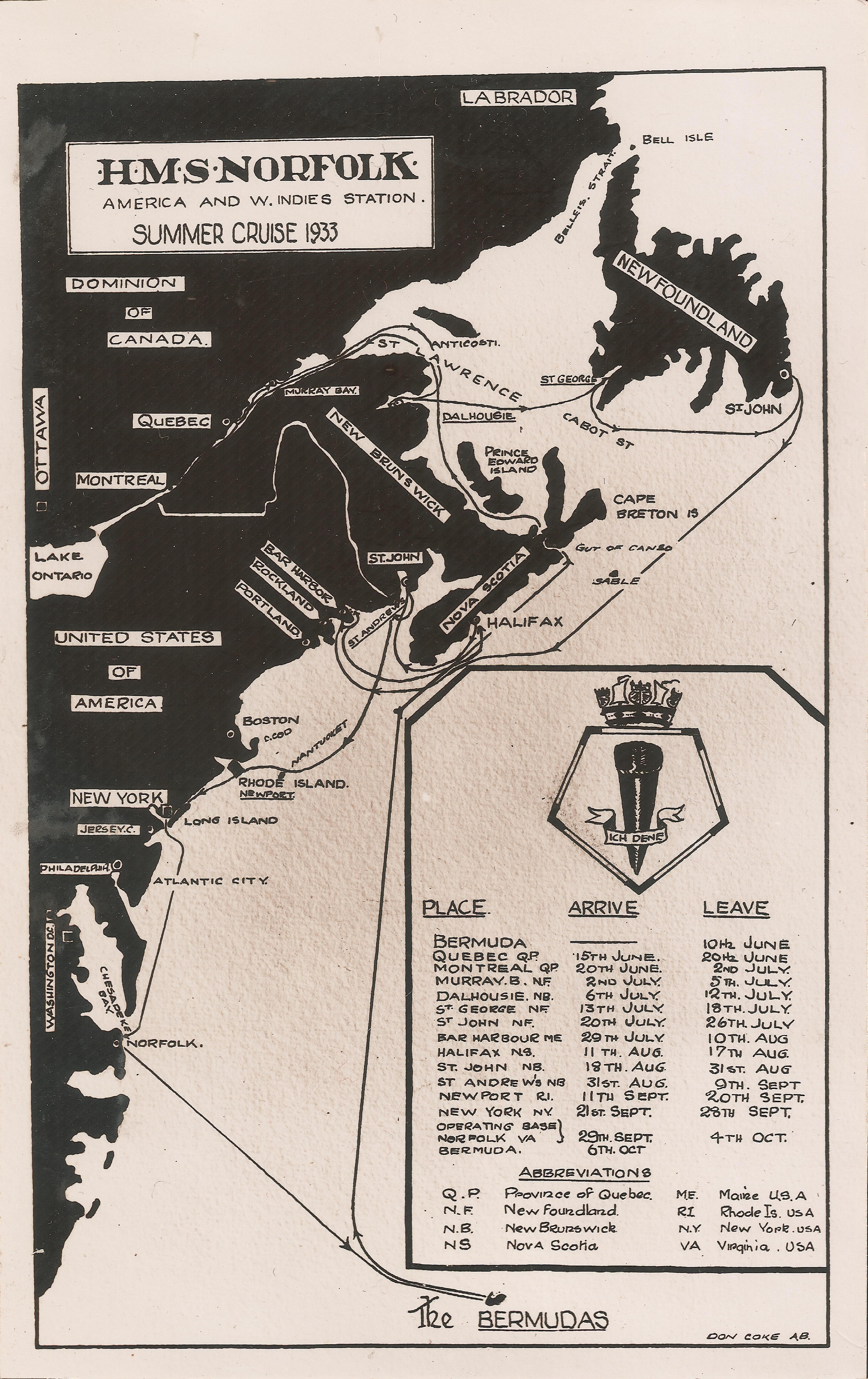
1933 HMS Norfolk Summer cruise map

Bermuda (1795) (Imperial fortress)

Royal Naval Dockyard, Bermuda on Ireland Island at Bermuda's 'West End', was opened in 1809 on land purchased following US independence. The Royal Navy had established itself at St. George's Town at Bermuda's East End in 1795, after a dozen years spent charting the surrounding reef line to find a channel suitable for ships of the line, but following the American War of 1812 it began relocating entirely to the West End with the dockyard and Admiralty House, Bermuda moved to sites on opposite sides of the entrance to the Great Sound). The main anchorage at the West End was Grassy Bay in the mouth of the Great Sound, although the original, Murray's Anchorage north of St. George's Island also remained in frequent use. The channel through the barrier reef, which led to Murray's Anchorage and the Great Sound, was originally named Hurd's Channel, after its surveyor, Lieutenant (later Captain) Thomas Hurd, but is today more frequently called The Narrows. It gives access not only to Murray's Anchorage (named for Commander-in-Chief Vice-Admiral Sir George Murray, who led the fleet of the North American Station through the channel to anchor there for the first time in 1794) but to the entire northern lagoon, the Great Sound and Hamilton Harbour, making the channel vital to the success of the Town of Hamilton, which had been established in 1790, and the economic development of the central and western parishes of Bermuda. Although the navy had already begun buying property at the West End with the intent of constructing the dockyard there, there was little infrastructure west of St. George's at the time and no functional port at Ireland Island, hence the need at first to operate from St. George's Town, with Admiralty House first on Rose Hill in St. George's, then at Mount Wyndham above Bailey's Bay. Convict Bay, beside St. George's Town and below the army barracks of St. George's Garrison, became the first base, with other properties at the East End leased or acquired to support it. The blockade of US Atlantic ports during the American War of 1812 was orchestrated from Bermuda, as was the Chesapeake Campaign. Admiralty House moved in 1816 to Spanish Point (near to the new Government House and the Town of Hamilton, which has become the colonial capital in 1815), facing Ireland Island and Grassy Bay across the mouth of the Great Sound, with the concurrent move of the anchorage and shore facilities to the West End. Bermuda became, first the winter (with Halifax serving this role in the summer), and then the year-round, main base and dockyard of the station, which was to become the North America and West Indies Station after absorbing the Jamaica Station (ultimately designated the America and West Indies Station, once it absorbed the areas that had formerly belonged to the South East Coast of America Station and the Pacific Station). Aside from the roles played by Royal Naval squadrons based at Bermuda during the two world wars, Bermuda also served as a forming-up point for trans-Atlantic convoys during both conflicts. Between the wars, a Royal Naval Air Station was established in the North Yard of the dockyard. Operated by the Royal Air Force on the navy's behalf until the Royal Navy took over complete responsibility for the Fleet Air Arm in 1939, this was originally tasked with maintenance, repair, and replacement of the floatplanes and flying-boats with which the station's cruisers were equipped. With the outbreak of the Second World War, the air station, which relocated to Boaz Island, began flying anti-submarine air patrols on an ad hoc basis until the handing this duty over to United States Navy patrol aircraft. The United States Navy and United States Army were permitted to establish bases in Bermuda under 99-year leases during the war, with command of the North Atlantic split between the Royal Navy in the East and the United States in the West. The alliance would endure after the war, with profound effects on the Royal Naval establishment in the region and the status of the dockyard in Bermuda. After the Second World War the dockyard was no longer deemed relevant to Royal Navy operations and was closed between 1951 (when a floating drydock was removed, and the yard status changed to a base) and 1958, when most of the dockyard, along with other Admiralty and War Office land in Bermuda was sold to the Colonial Government. However, a small base, HMS Malabar, continued to operate from the South Yard throughout the Cold War. Ships of the fleet (which went from being a mix of cruisers and smaller vessels to a handful of station frigates before being removed and replaced in the 1980s with a single frigate designated West Indies Guardship, which only stopped at Bermuda on its way to take up station in the West Indies and again on its departure) based there after 1951 were required to cross the Atlantic to Portsmouth for repairs. This base was finally closed in 1995, 200 years after the establishment of permanent Royal Navy forces in Bermuda. Site re-developed and now include Bermuda Maritime Museum, pedestrian mall and cruise ship dock.

Esquimalt Royal Navy Dockyard, Esquimalt, Canada. In 1865, the Royal Navy relocated its Pacific Station headquarters from Valparaíso, Chile, to Esquimalt Harbour (site of a small naval hospital and coaling station since the mid-1850s). In 1887, a naval base was located at Work Point. In 1905, the Royal Navy abandoned its base, but the Pacific Fleet headquarters of the new Royal Canadian Navy replaced it in 1910. Partially home to Pacific Command of the RCN, historic buildings are now preserved. Royal Naval Dockyard, Halifax, Canada (1759) (Imperial fortress). Operated as HM Dockyard from 1759 to 1905 and sold to Canada in 1907. Halifax was the main base of the North American Station until the establishment of the base at Bermuda, subsequently designated as the main base in Summer, with the fleet moving to Bermuda for the winter. Ultimately, Bermuda (which was less vulnerable to attack over water or land) became the main base and dockyard year-round, with Halifax and all other yards and bases in the region as subsidiaries). It became a RCN facility in 1910 and is now known as HMC Dockyard and is a component of CFB Halifax.

The Great Lakes, as largely self-contained bodies of water, required their own dockyards to service the Provincial Marine. Several substantial ships were built at these yards during the time of the Napoleonic Wars.

- Amherstburg Royal Naval Dockyard, Amherstburg, Ontario operated from 1796 to 1813. Preserved as national historic site and municipal park.
- Grand River Naval Depot, Port Maitland, Ontario – planned facility was never built and now site of Port Maitland Sailing Club.
- Île aux Noix, operated from 1812 to 1834, the principal yard for Lake Champlain (replacing an earlier establishment at St-Jean). Gunboats were built here. Fort Lennox historic site is now preserved. Rest of island is naturalised as parkland.
- Kingston Royal Naval Dockyard, Kingston, Canada. The RN dockyard operated at Point Frederick from 1789 to 1853; the site was expanded during the War of 1812. It is now closed, this yard was near where the Royal Military College of Canada is now situated.
- Navy Island Royal Naval Shipyard on Navy Island near Niagara Falls, Ontario (1763–1813). Island has naturalised and now owned by Parks Canada. Not open to public.
- Penetanguishene Naval Yard, Penetanguishene, Ontario operated from 1813 to 1834; transferred to British Army until 1856. Now site preserved as Discovery Harbour.
- Naval Shipyards, York (Upper Canada) from 1798 to 1813. Later became commercial hub for shipyards and wharfs. Since filled in and re-developed as retail and residential neighbourhood.

=== India and Far East ===
Ceylon (1813) The naval dockyard at Trincomalee began as a simple careening wharf, with a capstan house and storehouse. It gradually grew, though the Admiralty was also investing in commercial facilities in Colombo. Trincomalee was threatened with closure in 1905 as the Admiralty's focus was on Germany, but it remained in service, and was headquarters of the Eastern Fleet for a time during World War II. In 1957 it was handed over to the Royal Ceylon Navy; today it is the SLN Dockyard of the Sri Lanka Navy.

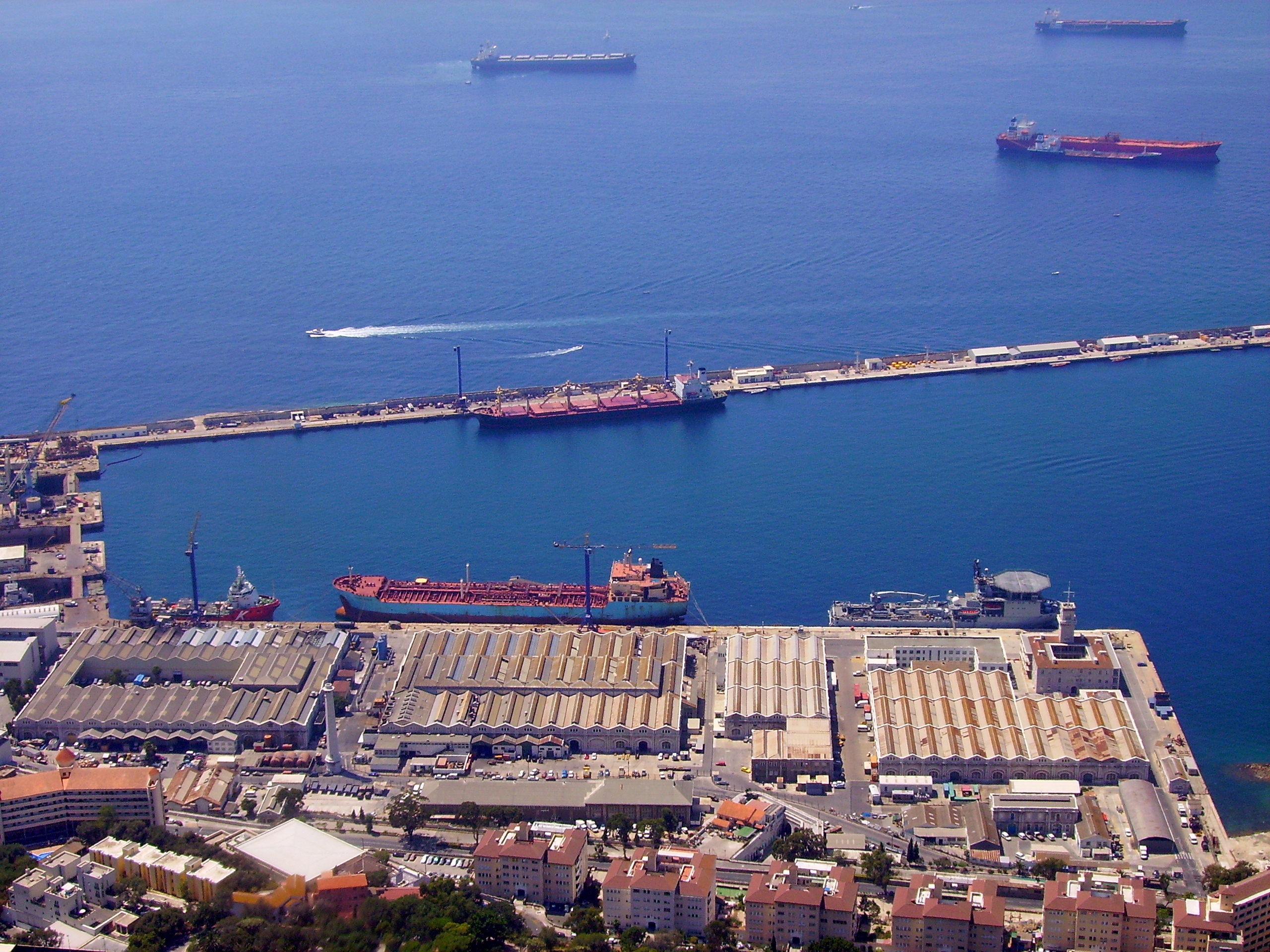
Former Royal Dockyard, Gibraltar

Hong Kong (1859) There was an RN Dockyard from 1859 to 1959 on Hong Kong Island, established on the site of an earlier victualling yard. The base was later known as HMS Tamar; Tamar remained operational after the closure of the dockyard (albeit on a smaller scale) until the year before the Handover. It then relocated briefly to Stonecutters Island, before closing in 1997. The RN also operated at the Kowloon Naval Yard from 1901 to 1959 (which is different from the Hong Kong & Whampoa dockyard at Hung Hom, known as the Kowloon Dockyard); this was primarily a coaling station. Part of the base is now part of the People's Liberation Army Hong Kong Garrison since 1997 and rest became the Tamar Complex Central Government Complex (Hong Kong).

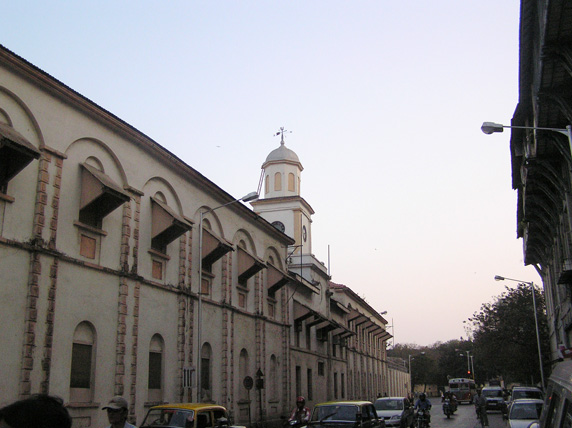
Dockyard building of 1807, Mumbai

India During the Napoleonic Wars the Royal Navy took over Madras Dockyard (1796) and Bombay Dockyard (1811), both of which had been dockyards of the East India Company long before the Navy took charge. Several warships were built under contract in these yards in the early eighteenth century, as was HMS Trincomalee (launched in 1817 and still afloat). Naval Dockyard, Mumbai, is now in the custody of the Indian Navy; the Madras yard closed in 1813, transferring to Ceylon. There is also the substantial British-built naval base at Cochin. Other facilities were located in Calcutta, and several other places in the Indian administration – e.g. Aden.

Singapore (1938) HMNB Singapore was established in the 1930s at Sembawang. It was built around the King George VI Graving Dock (which when opened was the world's largest dry dock). The Naval Base and Dockyard fell into Japanese hands during World War II, and became the target of Allied bombing raids. The base was transferred to the Singapore government in 1971, but is no longer in use by the Singapore Navy (who have since built 2 more modern bases in the island nation); there is, however, a continuing RN presence at the British Defence Singapore Support Unit. The US Navy also has a presence at the base: one of the adjacent barracks, formerly known as HMS Terror, is now the main recreation and welfare centre for US Navy personnel, known as the 'Terror Club'.

Wei Hai Wei (1898) The Royal Navy inherited a small dockyard on Liugong Island when this territory was leased from China at the end of the nineteenth century. The yard was expanded, and served as a regular summer anchorage up until the Second World War (though the territory, and with it control of the base, was returned to China in 1930). Used by Japanese forces during World War II and after by People's Liberation Army, some historic buildings remains today.

=== Mediterranean ===
Malta (1800) (Imperial fortress) Malta Dockyard in Valletta, previously operated by the Knights of Malta, became the main base for the Royal Navy's Mediterranean Fleet. The Royal Dockyard closed in 1959; a private yard operated on site thereafter.

Menorca (1708) The Port Mahon Dockyard was established at Port Mahon, one of the world's deepest natural harbours. It was the Royal Navy's principal Mediterranean base for much of the eighteenth century; however the territory changed hands more than once in that time, before being finally ceded to Spain in 1802. The yard is still used by the Spanish Navy. One of the first Royal Naval Hospitals was established here in 1711.

Gibraltar (1704) (Imperial fortress) A small base served the Royal Navy in this strategically important location throughout the 18th and 19th centuries. At the start of the 20th, HM Dockyard, Gibraltar was dramatically expanded and modernised, with the addition of three dry docks (one an unprecedented 852 ft (260 m) in length). HM Dockyard was closed in 1984. It is now operated as a commercial facility by Gibdock, although there is still a Royal Navy presence, which provides a maintenance capability. Gibraltar's naval docks are an important base for NATO. British and US nuclear submarines frequently visit the "Z berths" at Gibraltar. (A Z berth provides the facility for nuclear submarines to visit for operational or recreational purposes, and for non-nuclear repairs.)

=== Australasia ===
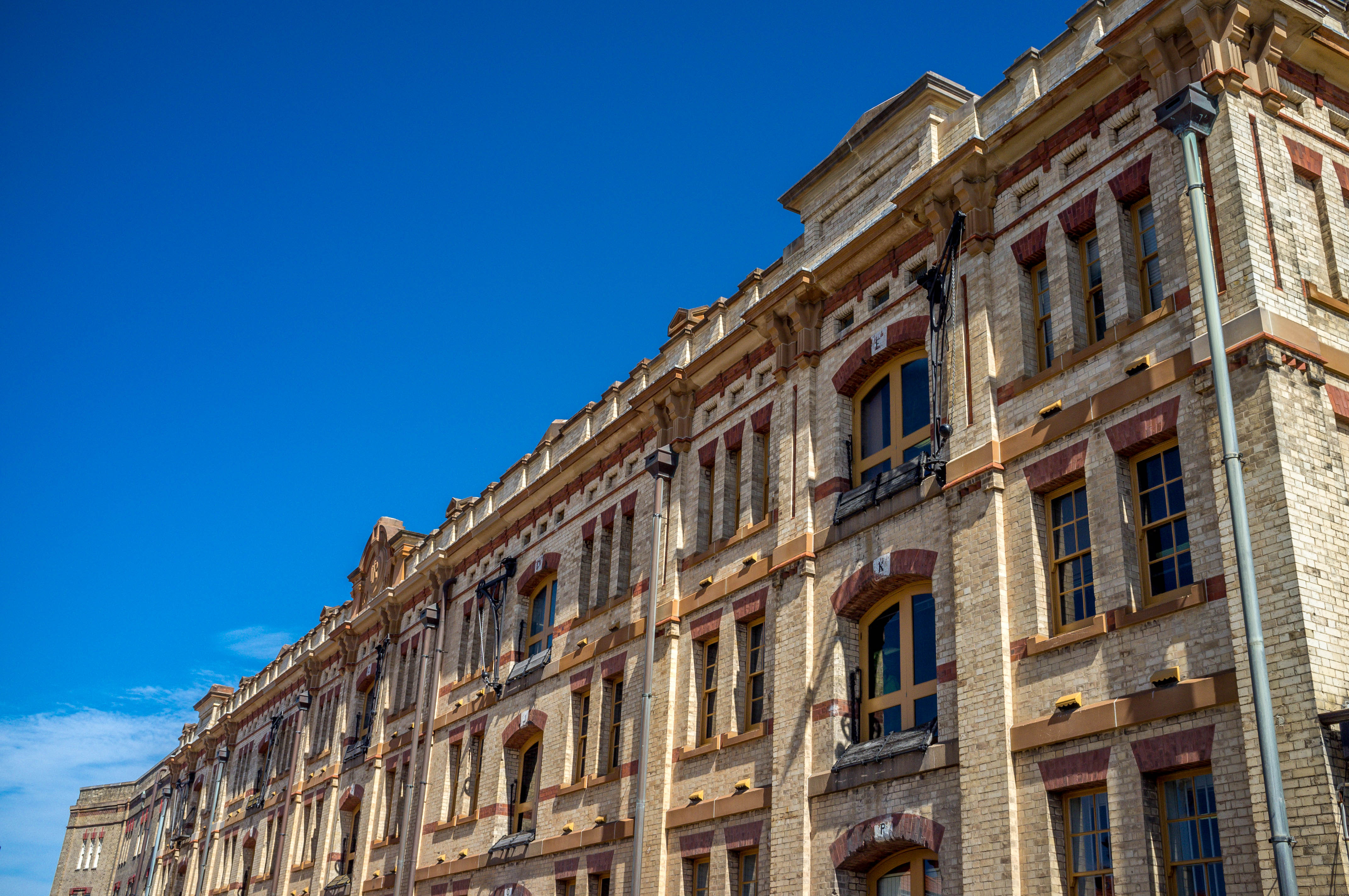
Naval Storehouse, c.1890, Garden Island, NSW, Australia

New South Wales, Australia (1859) In 1858 the Admiralty acquired land on Garden Island in Sydney Harbour, and established a small naval base there. In the 1880s it was substantially expanded (though no dry docks were built, as the Navy had use of the facilities at nearby Cockatoo Island Dockyard operated by the Government of New South Wales). In 1913 HM Naval Yard, Garden Island was handed over to the nascent Royal Australian Navy which is based there to this day.

New Zealand (1892) Devonport Dockyard began in the 1890s as a small complex of wooden storehouses; since 1913 it has served as the principal base of the Royal New Zealand Navy.

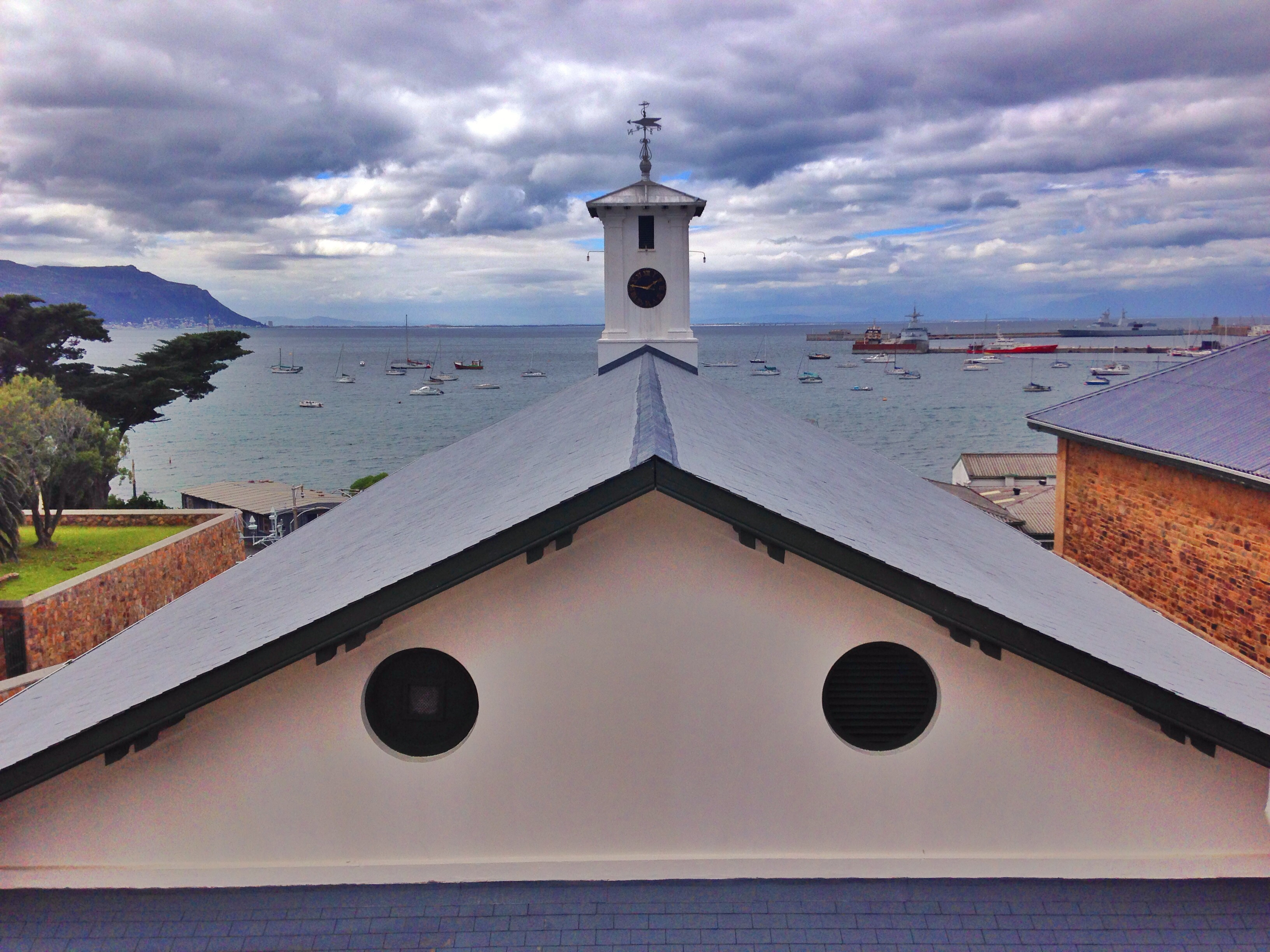
Former mast house and sail loft of 1815 at Simon's Town; now the South African Naval Museum

=== Other ===
Ascension Island

A dockyard and naval base was established in 1816 Georgetown following Napoleon's imprisonment on Saint Helena; it went on to serve as a victualling, repair and supply station for the West Africa Squadron. A Naval Hospital was established on site in 1832, and new facilities for servicing steam warships were added in the 1860s. Naval activity had substantially decreased by the end of the 19th century, but the island remained under Admiralty control until 1922. Still partially supports Falklands' Garrison at Mare Harbour since the 1980s.

Aden

HM Naval Base, Aden was established at Steamer Point; the base had been in use from at least 1839 and remained in use by the Royal Navy until 1966. It served as the headquarters of the Naval Officer-in-Charge, Aden, and was a base for the Red Sea Force during World War II. Base closed after independence and now home to civilian dockyards.

South Africa (1796)

In 1795 Britain inherited two small Dutch East India Company dockyards in Cape Town and nearby Simon's Town, and opted to develop the latter as a naval base. Naval Base Simon's Town is now in the custody of the SANDF

== See also ==
- List of Royal Navy shore establishments
- Naval Dockyards Society
- Royal Naval Armaments Depot
- Arson in royal dockyards
