= Lawrence Wright (Royal Navy officer) =

Lawrence Wright (died 1713), was a commodore with the English Royal Navy.

== Early career ==
Wright is first mentioned as lieutenant aboard Baltimore in 1665.

In 1666, he was on board Royal Charles, flagship of George Monck, 1st Duke of Albemarle. With this ship he took part in two naval engagements of the Second Anglo–Dutch War: the Four Days' Battle and the St. James's Day Battle.

== Captain and commodore ==
Wright is said to have been almost continuously employed during the next twenty years of peace and war, but the details of his services cannot be accurately traced. Those given by Charnock are not entirely trustworthy and some of them appear very doubtful.

He is said to have taken up the post of captain from 1672.

On the accession of James II of England in 1685, Wright was appointed to command the yacht Mary. In March 1687 was moved into HMS Foresight, which carried Christopher Monck, 2nd Duke of Albemarle, to Jamaica. Albemarle died within a year of his taking up the governorship and Wright returned to England with the corpse. He arrived at the end of May 1689.

== Tour of the West Indies ==
=== Crossing ===
The following October (1689), Wright was appointed to the 60-gun ship HMS Mary as commodore and commander-in-chief of an expedition to the West Indies. He was ordered to fly the union flag at the main. His instructions were 'to act according to the directions of General Codrington in all things relating to the land service,' and 'in enterprises at sea to act as should be advised by the governor and councils of war, when he had opportunity of consulting them.' He was, 'when it was necessary, to spare as many seamen as he could with regard to the safety of the ships,' and he was not 'to send any ship from the squadron until the governor and council were informed of it and satisfied that the service did not require their immediate attendance.'

The squadron set sail from Plymouth on 8 March 1690. It consisted of eight smaller two-decked ships, a few larger frigates, and fire ships. After a stormy passage the squadron reached Barbados on 11 May, with the ships' companies very sickly.

=== Support of Codrington ===
It was not until the end of the month that Wright could go on to Antigua and join Codrington, who combined the two functions of governor of the Leeward Islands and commander-in-chief of the land forces. It was resolved to attack St. Christopher by sea and land, and St. Christopher was reduced with very little loss. English forces also took possession of St. Eustatius. In August the squadron went to Barbados for the hurricane months. In October, Wright rejoined Codrington at St. Christopher, and it was resolved to attack Guadeloupe.

However, while preparations were being made, Wright received orders from home to return to England. He accordingly went to Barbados, which he reached on 30 December. The want of stores and provisions delayed him there, and before he was ready to sail counter-orders reached him, directing him to remain and cooperate with Codrington.

Wright's squadron was not in fighting trim. He had sent two ships to Jamaica; two others had sailed for England in charge of convoy; and the remaining vessels with him were deteriorating, leaking badly, and with their lower masts sprung. To strengthen his squadron as much as possible, he hired several merchant ships into the service. However, it was the middle of February 1691 before he could put to sea.

=== Quarrel with Codrington ===
When Wright's naval forces at last joined Codrington at St. Christopher's, a serious quarrel between the two threatened to put a stop to all further operations. The details of the quarrel were never made public, but it may be assumed that it sprang out of the ill-defined relations between the two men, and the probable confusion in the minds of both regarding the governor and the general. General Codrington was, in fact, only a colonel in the army and it is probable that Wright saw the distinction as marked in his instructions more clearly than Codrington did. Whatever the cause, the quarrel seems to have been very bitter on both sides.

=== Failure at Guadeloupe ===
However, after some delays, the attack on Guadeloupe was attempted. Troops landed on the island on 21 April 1691 but little progress had been made by 14 May.

On report of a French squadron in the neighbourhood, Wright went to sea, came in sight of it, and chased it. As his ships were foul and some of them jury-rigged, the enemy easily outsailed him. Finding his pursuit useless, Wright recalled his ships and returned to Guadeloupe, when it was resolved to give up the attack. Wright avowedly gave up the attack in consequence of great sickness among his ships' companies and troops. On the other hand, it is possible that Wright, and perhaps even Codrington, realised that the appearance of the French squadron threatened England's absolute command of the sea, which was a primary condition of success. The squadron returned to Barbados, where Wright himself was struck down by the sickness.

On the urgent advice of the medical men, he turned the command over to the senior captain, Robert Arthur, and took passage to England.

In the West Indies, feelings ran extremely high. Most of the officials and military men, taking the side of Codrington, attributed the failure at Guadeloupe to Wright's disaffection or cowardice. The merchants, whose trade had been severely scourged by the enemy's privateers, were kept together by the governor's orders to support the attacks on the French islands; they attributed their losses to Wright's carelessness, if not treachery, and clamoured for his punishment.

=== Court-martial ===
Numerous accusations followed Wright to England, and he was formally charged 'with mismanagement, disaffection to the service, breach of instructions, and other misdemeanors.' Charnock says that there was neither trial nor investigation, but this is erroneous. On 20 May 1693 the joint admirals presided at a court-martial. Upon 'duly examining the witnesses upon oath,' after 'mature deliberation upon the whole matter,' and 'in consideration that Mr. Hutcheson, late secretary to the governor, was the chief prosecutor, and in regard of the many differences that did appear to have happened betwixt the governor and Captain Wright,' the presiding officers gave opinion that 'the prosecution was not grounded on any zeal or regard to their majesties' service, but the result of particular resentments,' that it was 'in a great measure a malicious prosecution,’ and they resolved that Wright was 'not guilty of the charge laid against him.' The influence of the accusers was, however, so strong that the sentence of the court was virtually set aside, and Wright had no further employment for nine years.

== Later career ==
After the accession of Queen Anne, Wright was appointed on 14 May 1702 as Commissioner of the Navy, Kinsale, Ireland.

He subsequently was moved to the Navy Board as extra commissioner on 8 May 1713.

== Death ==
Wright died in London on 27 November 1713.
