= Kinsale Dockyard =

BRN base

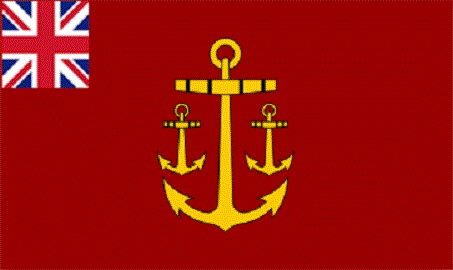
HM Dockyard Kinsale
- Kinsale in Ireland

Site information
- Operator: English Navy, Royal Navy
- Controlled by: Navy Board

Site history
- In use: 1647-1812

Garrison information
- Past commanders: Commissioner of the Navy, Kinsale
- Occupants: Irish Squadron

Kinsale Dockyard was a British Royal Navy base located at Kinsale, Ireland from c. 1647 to 1812.

== History ==
Map of Kinsale Harbour in 1741 from the collection of Royal Museums Greenwich, London, England

By the early 17th century, Kinsale Harbour was already 'a place of great resort for his Majesty's ships of war' During the Battle of Kinsale, ships were often careened on the isthmus of the Castlepark peninsula, where (in an area still known as 'The Dock') facilities were provided for ship repair and maintenance. Later in the century, these facilities migrated across the river to the Custom House Quay at Kinsale itself. By the mid-17th century, a small dockyard had been established, with staff including locally-known shipwrights from Chudleigh family (John Chudleigh, first appointed as assistant to the Master Shipwright in 1647, later served as Master Shipwright at the yard and was succeeded by his son, Thomas Chudeleigh). In 1650, victualling facilities were established alongside the dockyard; these played a key role in the provisioning of westbound vessels setting off from England and Ireland to the colonies. In 1683 the newly constituted Victualling Board appointed an Agent Victualler to Kinsale to oversee these operations. At the same time, work was underway to improve fortifications around the harbour: the 'New Fort' (Charles Fort) was opened in 1682, to complement the 'Old Fort' (James's Fort).

The dockyard initially served as one of the bases for the Royal Navy's Irish Squadron. Then, in 1694, the English Parliament established Kinsale as the headquarters for co-ordinating convoy operations in the Western Approaches (for protecting merchant shipping from attacks by privateers). In connection, it became home base for up to forty-three cruizers, deployed there to serve as escort ships (though some were based in Bristol, which had a similar co-ordinating role in relation to the Welsh coast). The escort cruizers were mainly fifth-rate naval vessels: small but fast; indeed, Kinsale was always limited to handling smaller vessels, owing to the sandbar at the mouth of the River Bandon. Prize vessels were often brought to Kinsale; the vessels would be anchored in the river and their crews imprisoned in the town.

Although the yard was mainly focussed on ship maintenance, some building took place, most notably of the eponymously named frigate HMS Kinsale, which was launched there on 22 May 1700. The yard was small compared to the larger Royal Navy Dockyards in England; yet at the height of its activity, in the 1720s, the complex supported a not insubstantial body of labourers, including sixty joiners, forty shipwrights and an assortment of coopers, caulkers, maltsters and smiths.

A survey of the dockyard undertaken by Sir Charles Vallancey in 1777 describes storehouses arranged around three sides of a quadrangle fronting on to the river, an open courtyard containing a mast pond and other buildings (including offices, a sail loft, paint shop and nail store) all enclosed within a perimeter wall, and an area with a boathouse and slipway; however, Vallancey also reported that, while 'Kinsale was suitable in former years it could not [now] cater for our ships of war which draw more water than formerly'. Ominously for the yard's prospects, he concluded that this rendered 'the old Dock and Harbour of Kinsale inadequate for any considerable maritime accommodation or enterprise'.

By 1765 the Admiralty had acquired a property, further along the coast, at the Cove of Cork on the River Lee. Gradually, over the rest of the century, victualling and other facilities were moved there from Kinsale; but the new site was itself far from ideal. It was only after 1803, when the Agent Victualler suggested instead developing Haulbowline (a nearby uninhabited island in Cork Harbour) that Kinsale Dockyard was fully run down, a process that was completed by 1812.

== Administration of the dockyard and other key officials ==
Responsibility for naval dockyards rested with the Navy Board until 1832, local superintendence being exercised by civilian resident commissioners. Below are incomplete lists of key officials associated with the dockyard.

=== Commissioner of the Navy, Kinsale ===
Included:

- 1694–1702, Benjamin Timewell
- 1702–1713, Captain Lawrence Wright

=== Clerk of the Cheque ===
Included:

- 1676, William Penn

=== Master Attendant ===
Included:

- 1694–1712, Bartholomew Clements
- 1744–1748, Thomas Martin

=== Master Caulker ===
Included:

- 1647–1652, John Chudeleigh
- 1718–1719, Henry Knight

=== Master Shipwright ===
Included:

- 1647–1652, John Chudeleigh
- 1653–1676, Thomas Chudleigh
- 1698–1705, Richard Stacey
- 1705–1711, John Philips
- 1711–1714, John Philips
- 1714-1714, John Hayward
- 1744, Thomas Fearne

=== Master Sailmaker ===
Included:

- 1745, Stephen Harris

=== Muster Master ===
Included:

- 1705, John Griffin
- 1724–1725, John Bridger
- 1725–1752, Daniel Furzer
- 1753, Thomas Foxworthy
- 1783, John Heard

=== Storekeeper ===
Included:

- 1705, John Griffin
- 1724–1725, John Bridger
- 1725–1752, Daniel Furzer
- 1753, Thomas Foxworthy
- 1783, John Heard

== Bibliography ==
1. Coad, Jonathan (2013). Support for the Fleet: Engineering and architecture of the Royal Navy's bases, 1700–1914. Swindon, UK: English Heritage.
2. Cock, Randolph; Rodger, N. A. M. (2008). "A Guide to the Naval records in the National Archives of the UK" (PDF). London, England: Institute of Historical Research, University of London.
3. Clowes, William Laird; Markham, Clements R. (Clements Robert) (1897–1903). The royal navy, a history from the earliest times to the present. London: S. Low, Marston.
4. Davies, J. D. (20 November 2008). Pepys's navy : ships, men & warfare, 1649–1689. Barnsley, England: Seaforth. p. 194.ISBN 9781848320147.
5. Harrison, Simon (2010–2018). "Kinsale Dockyard, Offices associated with Kinsale Dockyard". threedecks.org. S . Harrison.
6. Murphy, Elaine (2012). Ireland and the War at Sea, 1641–1653. Woodbridge, England: Boydell & Brewer Ltd. ISBN 9780861933181.
7. "Records of Dockyards". (1690–1981). www.discovery.nationalarchives.gov.uk. Kew, England: The National Archives UK.
8. Stockdale, John (1802). The Parliamentary Register: Or, History of the Proceedings and Debates of the House of Commons. London, England:
9. Thuillier, John R. (2014). Kinsale Harbour: A History. Wilton, Cork, Ireland: The Collins Press.
