= Irish Squadron =

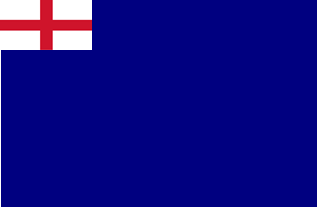
- Blue Ensign of the English Navy (1625-1707)
- Active: 1297 - 1731
- Country: United Kingdom
- Branch: Royal Navy
- Type: Detached Squadron
- Role: Convoy Protection, Transportation, Patrol
- Garrison/HQ: Milford Haven, Wales; Greenock, Scotland

The Irish Squadron originally known as the Irish Fleet was a series of temporary naval formations assembled for specific military campaigns of the English navy and Royal Navy between 1297 and 1731.

== History ==
From the 13th to 17th centuries, the Irish Squadron was a temporary formation assembled for specific naval campaigns, commanded by a senior officer whose title changed a number of times. It was one of four separate fleets, the other three being the Western, Northern and Aquitaine, each with their own independent commander, until 1406 when they came under the unified command of the High Admiral of England, Ireland and Aquitaine. For most of its existence, the Irish Squadron conducted operations from Milford Haven in Wales, before switching to Greenock, Scotland during the 1680s.

Irish Squadron main operating bases

In 1298, Edward I of England appointed Sir William de Leybourne as the first "Admiral of the Irish Sea", responsible for all English ships operating in that area. During the 14th century, the squadron was formed on four occasions, first in 1356 during the reign of Edward III of England to protect troop convoys against Scottish privateers. The other three occasions were in support of expeditions against Ireland ordered by Richard II of England; in 1382 under Sir William Spalding, 1397 under John Beaufort, 1st Earl of Somerset and from January to September 1399 under Thomas Percy, 1st Earl of Worcester.

During the Tudor period, the squadron was re-established for service in the 1539 to 1545 Anglo-Scottish Wars and again during the 1569 to 1583 Desmond Rebellions led by Sir William Wynter, who was ordered to cut off all sea routes into Ireland and seize all ships of the pending papal invasion force. At the start of the First English Civil War in 1642, most of the navy was controlled by Parliament and until 1653 it was known as the "Irish Guard Naval Squadron of Parliament", playing a significant role in the 1649 to 1651 Cromwellian conquest of Ireland. Its strength varied but reached a peak of 56 ships in 1645, making it the second-largest squadron in the navy.

During the Nine Years' War, the squadron fought at the Battle of Bantry Bay in May 1689 under the command of George Rooke who retained his position until early 1690. In June 1690, it took part in the Capture of Waterford led by Rear-Admiral Cloudesley Shovell and in 1691 was part of a larger naval force assembled to transfer King William III to Ireland. Reformed in July 1727 and in July 1731, it was gradually reduced in numbers before being disbanded. During the French Revolutionary Wars in 1797, the Royal Navy finally established a permanent naval formation for the Irish Sea known as the Coast of Ireland Station, based in Cork with repair and resupply bases at Kinsale Dockyard.

== In command ==
Note:Incomplete list of post holders include.

No.	rank	name	date/s	appointed as	ref
1.	Admiral	Sir William de Leybourne	1297	Admiral of the Irish Sea and Admiral of the West	
2.	Admiral	Sir Gervase Alard	1304	Admiral of the Irish Sea	
3.	Admiral	John of Argyll	1311	Admiral of the Irish Sea	
4.	Admiral	John of Argyll	1314	Admiral of the Irish Sea	
5.	Admiral	Sir William Cray	1315	Admiral of the Irish Sea	
6.	Admiral	Sir John d'Athy	1318	Admiral of the Irish Sea	
7.	Admiral	Sir Simon Driby	1319	Admiral of the Irish Sea	
8.	Admiral	Sir Robert Leyburn	1322	Admiral of the Irish Sea	
9.	Admiral	Robert Bataill	1323	Admiral of the Irish Sea	
10.	Admirals	Sir Robert Bendyn and Stephen Alard	1324	Admiral of the Irish Sea (jointly)	
11.	Admirals	Sir Richard Holand	1335	Admiral of the Irish Sea	
12.	Admiral	Sir John d'Athy	1336	Admiral of the Kings Fleet in Ireland	
13.	Admiral	Robert Drouss, of Cork	1356	Admiral of the Irish Fleet	
14.	Admiral	Sir William Spalding	1382	Admiral of the Kings Fleet in Ireland	
15.	Admiral	Sir John Beaufort	1397	Admiral of the Irish Fleet	
16.	Admiral	Thomas Percy, 1st Earl of Worcester	1399	Admiral of the Kings Fleet in Ireland	
17.	Admiral	Sir James Dartasoo	1404	Admiral of the Kings Fleet in Ireland	
18.	Admiral	Sir Patrick Cotterell	1414	Admiral of the Kings Fleet in Ireland	
19.	Admiral	James Butler, 9th Earl of Ormonde	1539-1545	Admiral of Ireland	
20.	Vice-Admiral	Sir William Wynter	1560	Admiral of the Irish Squadron	
21.	Admiral	Sir Thomas Button	1616-1634	Admiral of the Irish Seas/Admiral of the Irish Coasts	
22.	Vice-Admiral	Sir John Pennington	1642-1643	Admiral of the Irish Guard	
23.	Vice-Admiral	William Smith	1643 summer	Vice-Admiral, Commander Irish Guard	
24.	Vice-Admiral	Richard Swanley	1643-1647	Admiral of the Irish Seas/Commander Irish Guard	
25.	Vice-Admiral	Thomas Rainsborough	1647-1648	Admiral of the Irish Seas/Commander Irish Guard	
26.	Vice-Admiral	Sir George Ayscue	1648-1650	Admiral of the Irish Seas	
27.	Rear-Admiral	George Rooke	1689-1690	Commanding the Irish Squadron as Rear-Admiral of the Red	
28.	Rear-Admiral	Cloudesley Shovell	1690-1691	Commanding the Irish Squadron as Rear-Admiral of the Blue	

== Squadron composition ==
The Irish Squadron as 1 September 1689.

#	type	notes	ref
7	Fourth-rate	Ships of the Line, 46-60 guns	
2	Fifth-rate	Frigates, 40 guns	
15	Sixth-rate	Frigates, 28 guns	
Total Ships: 24

== Bibliography ==
1. Clark, New Jersey, USA: The Lawbook Exchange, Ltd. ISBN 9781886363793.
2. Clowes, Sir William Laird (1897). The Royal Navy, a History from the Earliest Times to the Present (I ed.). London: Sampson Low Marston and Company.
3. Corbett, Julian Stafford (1917). "The Navy of Elizabeth". Drake and the Tudor navy, with a history of the rise of England as a maritime power. London, England: London : Longmans, Green.
4. Davies, J. D. (2008). "Convoys, Cruisers and Station Ships". Pepys Navy, Ships, Men and Warfare 1649 to 1689. Barnsley, England: Seaforth Publishing. ISBN 9781848320147
5. Fortescue, Sir John; Plummer, Charles (1999). The Governance of England, Otherwise Called, The Difference Between an Absolute and a Limited Monarchy.
6. Godolphin, John (1661). Synēgoros thalassios, A view of the admiral jurisdiction wherein the most material points concerning that jurisdiction are fairly and submissively discussed : as also divers of the laws, customes, rights, and privileges of the high admiralty of England by ancient records, and other arguments of law asserted: whereunto is added by way of appendix an extract of the ancient laws of Oleron / by John Godolphin ... University of Michigan, An Arbour, MI, USA: W. Godbid for Edmund Paxton and John Sherley.
7. Harris, Sir Nicholas. (1847). A History of the Royal Navy: 1327–1422. London: R. Bentley
8. Joyce, Patrick Weston (1910). "The Geraldine Rebellion - Concise History of Ireland". www.libraryireland.com. National Library of Ireland.
9. KEYMER, E. W.L.; REED, ADRIAN; GRAINGER, J. D.; WELCH, JOHN C.; LEE, C. D.; OWEN, HUGH (January 1996). "NOTES:Richard Swanley (c 1592-1650), Admiral of the Fleet on the Irish Coast". The Mariner's Mirror. 82 (4): 461–476. doi:10.1080/00253359.1996.10656619.
10. Laughton, John Knox. "Swanley Richard". Dictionary of National Biography, 1885–1900. Dictionary of National Biography, 1885–1900, Volume 55.
11. Le Fevre, Peter (January 1982). "SIR GEORGE AYSCUE, COMMONWEALTH AND RESTORATION ADMIRAL". The Mariner's Mirror. 68 (2): 189–202. doi:10.1080/00253359.1982.10655858.
12. Lenihan, Pádraig (2000). Conquest and Resistance: War in Seventeenth-Century Ireland. Leiden, Netherlands: Brill Publishing. ISBN 9789004117433.
13. Lundy, Darryl (19 September 2018). "Person Page: James Butler, 9th Earl of Ormonde". www.thepeerage.com. The Peerage. Retrieved 21 September 2018.
14. Manganiello, Stephen C. (2004). "Appendix: The Navy". The Concise Encyclopedia of the Revolutions and Wars of England, Scotland, and Ireland, 1639–1660. Scarecrow Press. ISBN 9780810851009.
15. Meredith, Jon (2009). "THE ENGLISH NAVY IN AN IRISH WAR: CAPTAIN GEORGE ROOKE'S SQUADRON AND THE JACOBITE WAR IN IRELAND, SUMMER 1689". The Mariner's Mirror. 95 (2): 179–193. doi:10.1080/00253359.2009.10657095.
16. Michael K. Jones and Malcolm G. Underwood, The King's Mother: Lady Margaret Beaufort, Countess of Richmond and Derby', 23.
17. Murphy, Elaine (2012). Ireland and the War at Sea, 1641–1653. Woodbridge, England: Boydell & Brewer Ltd. ISBN 9780861933181.
18. Rodger, N.A.M. (2006). "Appendix III: Fleets". The command of the ocean: a naval history of Britain 1649-1815 (1st ed.). London, England: Penguin. ISBN 9780141026909.
19. Rodger, N.A.M. (1997). "Appendix V Admirals and Officials". The safeguard of the sea: a naval history of Britain. Vol 1., 660–1649. London, England: Penguin. ISBN 9780140297249.
20. Townsend, George Henry (1877). The Manual of Dates: A Dictionary of Reference to All the Most Important Events in the History of Mankind to be Found in Authentic Records. London, England: Frederick Warne.
21. Yonge, Charles Duke (1863). The History of the British Navy: From the Earliest Period to the Present Time. London, England: Richard Bentley.
