= Admiral (Royal Navy) =

Senior officer rank of the Royal Navy

- Shoulder board and sleeve lace

- Distinguishing flag

- Motor car star plate
- Country: United Kingdom
- Service branch: Royal Navy
- Abbreviation: Adm
- Rank group: Officers of flag rank
- Rank: Four-star rank
- NATO rank code: OF-9
- Formation: 1224
- Next higher rank: Admiral of the fleet
- Next lower rank: Vice admiral
- Equivalent ranks: General (RM/British Army); Air chief marshal (RAF)

Admiral (Adm) is a senior rank of the Royal Navy, which equates to the NATO rank code OF-9, outranked only by the rank of admiral of the fleet. Royal Navy officers holding the ranks of rear admiral, vice admiral and admiral of the fleet are sometimes considered generically to be admirals. The rank of admiral is currently the highest rank to which a serving officer in the Royal Navy can be promoted, admiral of the fleet being in abeyance except for honorary promotions of retired officers and members of the royal family.

The equivalent rank in the British Army and Royal Marines is general; and in the Royal Air Force, it is air chief marshal.

== History ==
=== The first admirals ===
The title admiral was not used in Europe until the mid-13th century and did not reach England before the end of that century. Similarly, although some royal vessels are attested under King John, the English long depended upon levies of their subjects' vessels for any major naval expeditions. Nonetheless, historians have sometimes extended the concept of an English navy and its supposed admirals and lord high admirals back as far as Alfred the Great, counting several kings as themselves admirals, along with various dukes and earls who commanded fleets at prominent engagements such as Hubert de Burgh off Sandwich in 1217. Other lists begin their count at King Henry III's appointment of Sir Richard de Lucy on 28 August 1223 or 29 August 1224. A similar commission was given to Sir Thomas Moulton in 1264, who held the formal title of Keeper of the Sea and the Sea Ports.

On 8 March 1287, Sir William de Leybourne was specifically commissioned as the Admiral of the Seas of England (Latin: Admirallus Maris Angliae) and, in 1294, captain of all sailors and mariners of the king's dominions. Sir John de Botetourt served under him as warden at sea from the Thames to Scotland. This was part of an effort by Edward I to establish a permanent official staff, even if a permanent naval force was not yet considered necessary. Leybourne's immediate purview was subsequently divided into the roles of Admiral of the West and Admiral of the South while Botetourt's became the Admiral of the North; the first and last merged as the Admiral of the North and West in 1364; and from 1408–1414 they were all reunited as the High Admiral of England, Ireland, and Aquitaine, the forerunner to the present Lord High Admiral. (During this process, the short-lived post of Admiral of the Narrow Seas was used in 1412 and 1413. It was subsequently revived from 1523 to 1688).

The first royal commission as Admiral to a naval officer was granted in 1303 to Gervase Alard. By 1344, it was only used as a rank at sea for a captain in charge of one or more fleets.

=== Squadron admirals of the colour from 1558 to 1603 ===
In Elizabethan times the fleet grew large enough to be organised into squadrons. The squadron's admiral flew a red ensign, the vice admirals white, and the rear admirals blue on the aft mast of his ship. As the squadrons grew, each was eventually commanded by an admiral (with vice admirals and rear admirals commanding sections) and the official ranks became admiral of the white and so forth, however each admiral's command flags were different and changed over time.

=== Introduction of vice and rear admirals ===
The Royal Navy has had vice and rear admirals regularly appointed to the post since at least the 16th century. When in command of the fleet, the admiral would be in either the lead or the middle portion of the fleet. When the admiral commanded from the middle portion of the fleet his deputy, the vice admiral, would be in the leading portion or van. Below him was another admiral at the rear of the fleet, called rear admiral.

=== Promotion path of flag officers from 1702 to 1864 ===
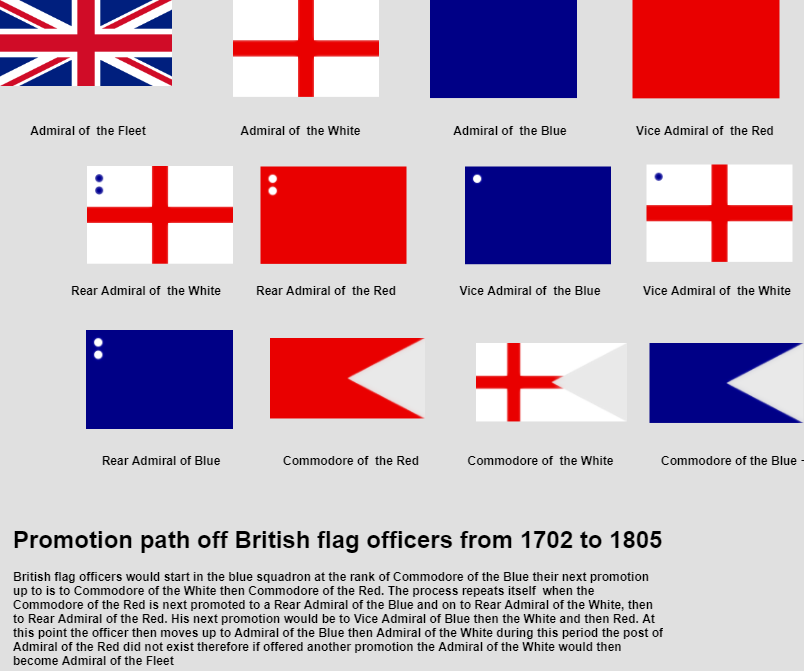
The promotion path of Royal Navy flag officers from 1702 to 1805. Beginning with Commodore of the Blue through to Admiral of the Fleet the officers command flags are shown for the period.

Promotion up the ladder was in accordance with seniority in the rank of post-captain, and rank was held for life, so the only way to be promoted was for the person above on the list to die or resign. In 1747 the Admiralty restored an element of merit selection to this process by introducing the concept of yellow admirals (formally known as granting an officer the position of "Rear-Admiral without distinction of squadron"), being captains promoted to flag rank on the understanding that they would immediately retire on half-pay. This was the navy's first attempt at superannuating older officers.

=== Interregnum to the present ===
During the Interregnum, the rank of admiral was replaced by that of general at sea. In the 18th century, the original nine ranks began to be filled by more than one man per rank, although the rank of admiral of the red was always filled by only one man and was known as Admiral of the Fleet. After the Battle of Trafalgar in 1805 the rank of admiral of the red was introduced. The number of officers holding each rank steadily increased throughout the 18th and early 19th centuries. In 1769 there were 29 admirals of various grades; by the close of the Napoleonic Wars in 1816 there were 190 admirals in service. Thereafter the number of admirals was reduced and in 1853 there were 79 admirals.

Although admirals were promoted according to strict seniority, appointments to command were made at the discretion of the Board of Admiralty. As there were invariably more admirals in service than there were postings, many admirals remained unemployed, especially in peacetime.

The organisation of the fleet into coloured squadrons was finally abandoned in 1864. The Red Ensign was allocated to the Merchant Navy, the White Ensign became the flag of the Royal Navy, and the Blue Ensign was allocated to the naval reserve and naval auxiliary vessels.

The 18th- and 19th-century Royal Navy also maintained a positional rank known as port admiral. A port admiral was typically a veteran captain who served as the shore commander of a British naval port and was in charge of supplying, refitting, and maintaining the ships docked at harbour.

The problem of promoting strictly by seniority was well illustrated by the case of Provo Wallis who served (including time being carried on the books while still a child) for 96 years. When he died in 1892 four admirals under him could immediately be promoted. By request of Queen Victoria, John Edmund Commerell became Admiral of the Fleet rather than Algernon Frederick Rous de Horsey, who as senior active admiral nearing the age limit would customarily have received the promotion.

In 1996, the rank of admiral of the fleet was put in abeyance in peacetime, except for members of the Royal family but was resurrected on an honorary basis in 2014 for the appointment of Lord Boyce. Admirals of the fleet continue to hold their rank on the active list for life.

== Rank insignia and personal flag ==
The current ranks are rear admiral, vice admiral, admiral and admiral of the fleet, also known as flag ranks because admirals, known as flag officers, are entitled to fly a personal flag. An admiral of the fleet flies a Union Flag at the masthead, while an admiral flies a St George's cross (red cross on white). Vice admirals and rear admirals fly a St George's cross with one or two red discs in the hoist, respectively.

The rank of admiral itself is shown in its sleeve lace by a broad band with three narrower bands. In 2001 the number of stars on the shoulder board was increased to four, reflecting the equivalence to the OF-9 four-star ranks of other countries.

Sleeve lace

Shoulder board

Shoulder board prior to 2001

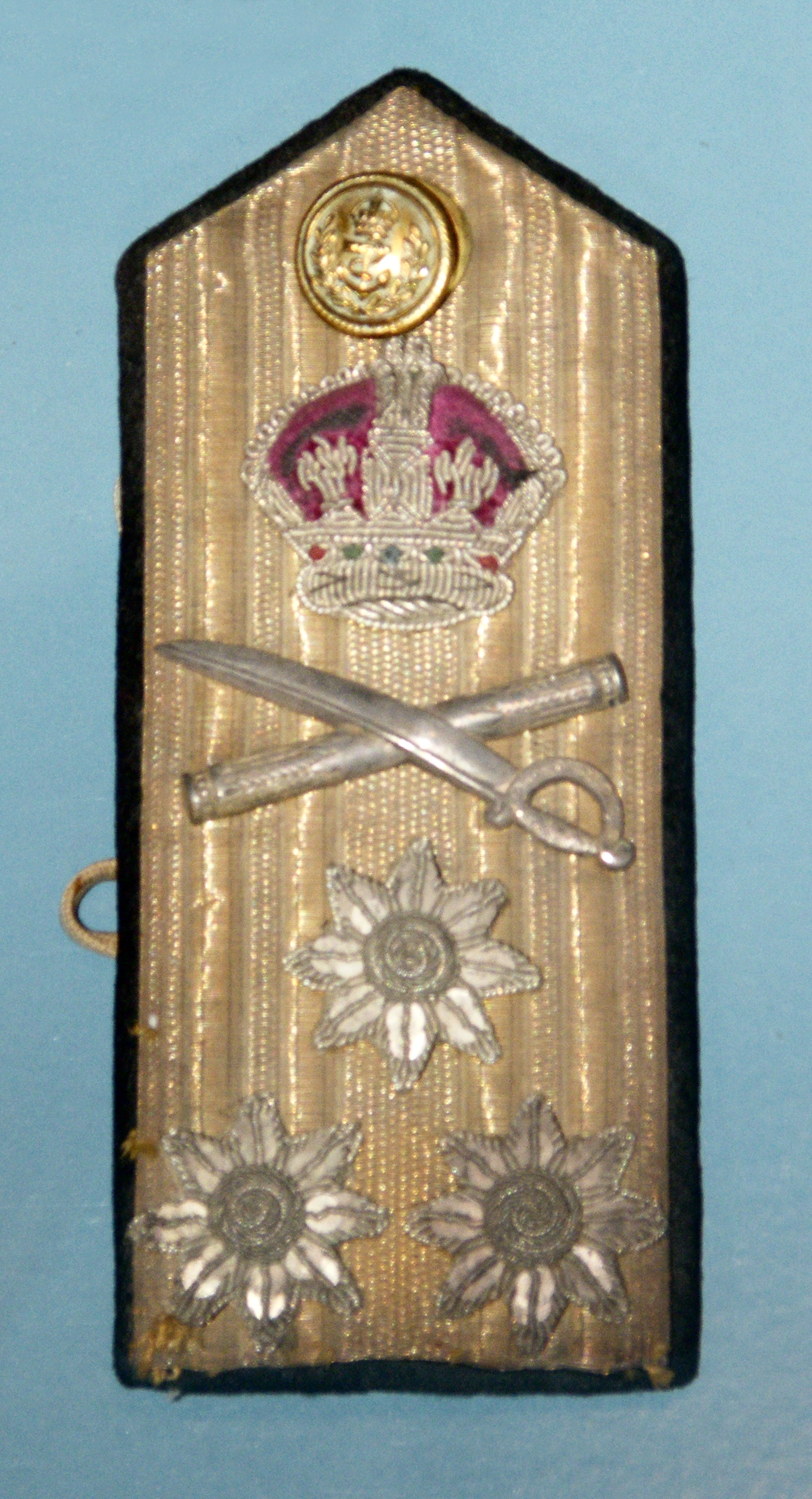
World War II admiral's shoulder board

Command flag for an admiral from 1864.

== History command flags ==
Prior to 1864 the Royal Navy was divided into coloured squadrons which determined his career path. The command flags flown by an Admiral changed a number of times during this period, there was no Admiral of the Red rank until that post was introduced in 1805 prior to this the highest rank an admiral could attain to was Admiral of the White who then flew the Cross of St George. The next promotion step up from that was to Admiral of the Fleet.

== See also ==
- Admiral of the Blue
- Admiral of the White
- Admiral of the Red
- British ensigns
- British and U.S. military ranks compared
- Coloured squadrons of the Royal Navy
- Comparative military ranks
- Royal Navy officer rank insignia
- List of Royal Navy admirals
- Lord High Admiral of the United Kingdom
