= Wardens of the Coast =

Royal Navy officials

The Wardens of the Coast, originally called the Keepers of the Coast or Keepers of the Sea, were officials appointed in the Kingdom of England and placed under the jurisdiction of one of the regional admiralties of England, those of the North, South and West. On behalf of the King of England they were responsible for the direction and co-ordination of the King's fleet, the equipping of boats and processing payments to sailors and the superintendence of the Sea Guard Militia assigned to each coastal maritime county during the 13th, 14th and 15th centuries. The most notable of these were the Warden of the Cinque Ports (1226–1267), later called Lord Warden of the Cinque Ports and Constable of Dover Castle (1267–present), and the Wardens of the Marches (1297–1603). By the beginning of the 16th century they were replaced by the vice-admiralties of the coast.
