= John Beauchamp, 1st Baron Beauchamp of Warwick =

Admiral of the Fleet Lord de Beauchamp
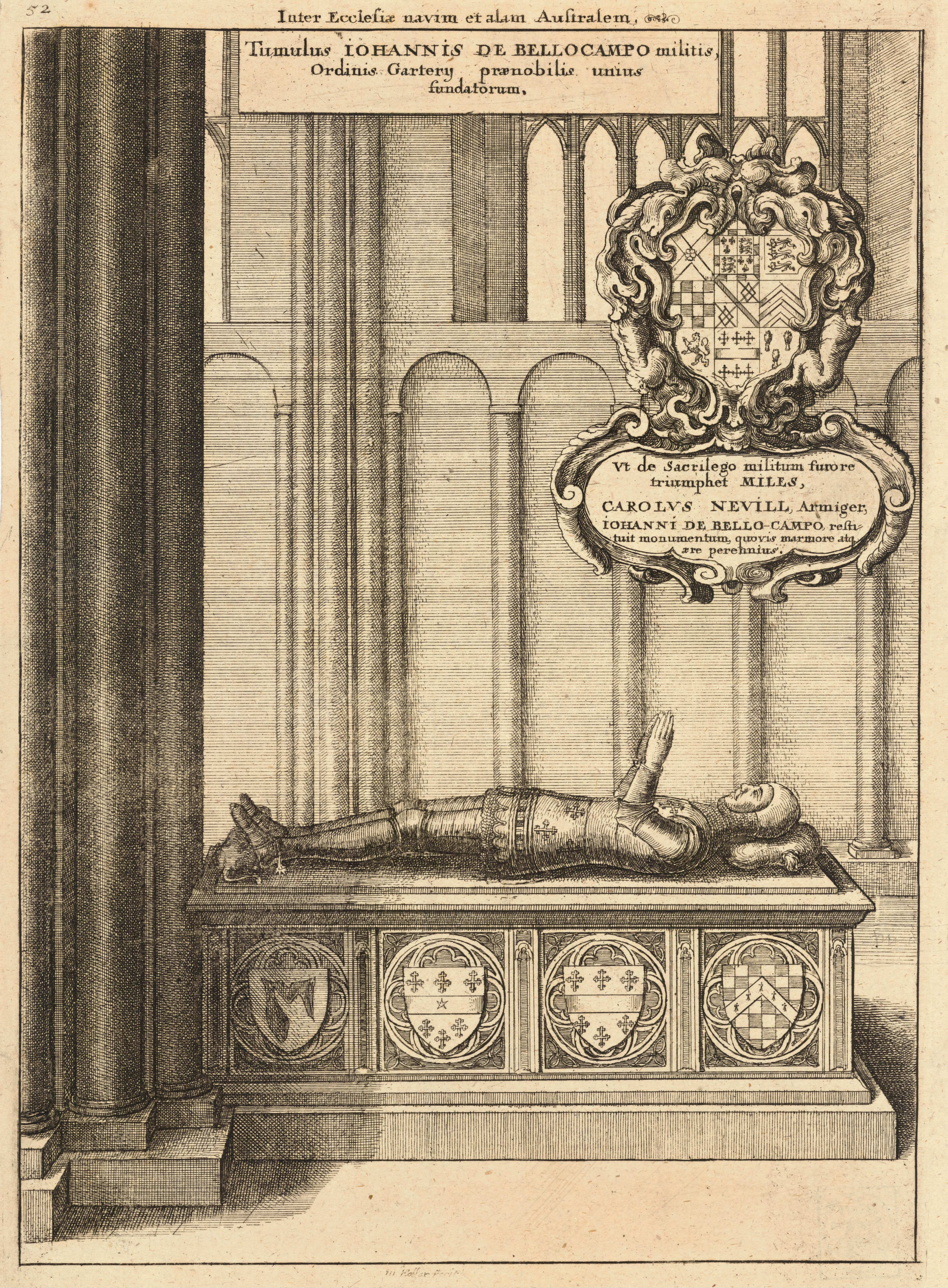
- Chest tomb of Sir John de Beauchamp, 1st Baron Beauchamp, KG, in Old St Paul's Cathedral, drawn in 1658 by Wenceslaus Hollar
- Born: 1316; Warwick
- Died: 2 December 1360 (aged 43–44); City of London
- Burial place: Old St Paul's Cathedral
- Military career
- Allegiance: England
- Branch: English navy
- Service years: 1338–1360
- Rank: Admiral
- Commands: Admiral of the fleet Admiral of the South; Admiral of the West; Constable of the Tower; Lord Warden of the Cinque Ports; Captain
- Conflicts: Battle of Crécy; Battle of Sluys

Admiral of the Fleet John Paveley de Beauchamp, 1st Baron Beauchamp de Warwick KG (c. 1316 – 2 December 1360) was the third son of Guy de Beauchamp, 10th Earl of Warwick, and brother of Thomas de Beauchamp, 11th Earl of Warwick, with whom he became a founder and the tenth Knight of the Order of the Garter in 1348.

== Personal ==
John de Beauchamp was born in Warwick, England, sometime between 1307 and 1316. His parents were Guy de Beauchamp, Earl of Warwick, (1272–1315), Warwick) and Alice de Toeni, later Countess of Warwick, who had seven children, including John. Towards the end of his life he resided in the parish of St. Andrew, near Baynard's Castle, City of London. He bequeathed his house to the King, who had it converted for use as his great wardrobe. A bachelor, he died without issue and his barony expired. His remains were interred, between two pillars, before the image of the Virgin, on the south side of the nave of Old St Paul's Cathedral, where there was a monument to his memory, incorrectly later known as Duke Humphrey's Tomb, because of the mistaken belief that it was the tomb of Humphrey of Lancaster, 1st Duke of Gloucester. The grave and monument were destroyed along with the old cathedral in the Great Fire of London in 1666. A modern monument in the crypt lists Beauchamp as one of the important graves lost.

== Early naval career ==
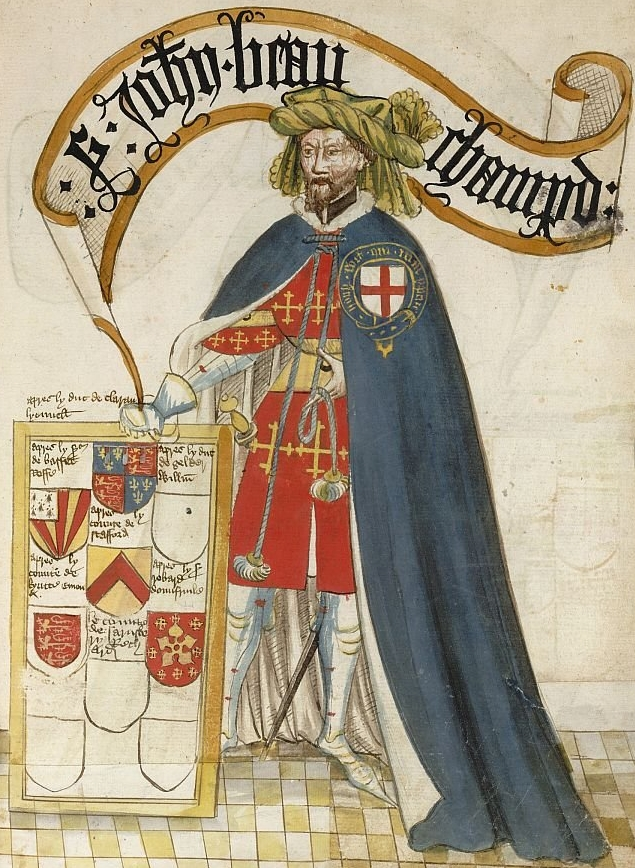
John de Beauchamp KG. He displays the arms of Beauchamp on his tabard, with a crescent sable for difference.

He attended King Edward III into Flanders in 1338, was in the array at Buironfosse in 1339, and shared the glory of the great naval victory off Sluys in 1340. He carried the Royal Standard at the Battle of Crécy in 1346 and was present at the siege and surrender of Calais, of which town he was appointed captain in 1348 a post he held for two years before his first appointment to a senior command role.

== Senior command ==
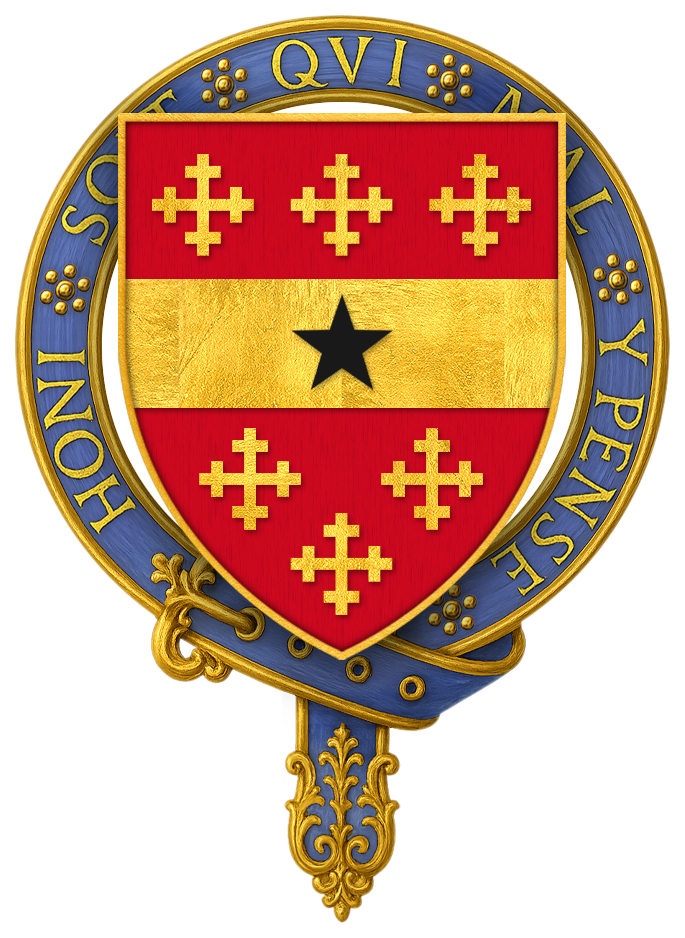
Arms of Sir John de Beauchamp, 1st Baron Beauchamp KG -- gules, a fess between six cross crosslets or, a mullet for difference

In 1350, he was appointed Admiral of the Fleet off Calais also known as the Southern Fleet; five years later on 5 March 1355 he was given command of the Western Sea's Fleet, a post he held till 1 March 1356. He was appointed 'Admiral of the King's Southern, Northern and Western Fleets' on 18 July 1360. The appointment gave the command of the English navy to one person for the first time; the post would evolve into the post of Admiral of the Fleet; he also held the posts of Constable of the Tower of London and Warden of the Cinque Ports. He was summoned to Parliament as a baron in 1350.

== Monument in St Paul's Cathedral ==
His chest tomb and recumbent effigy was situated by the tenth column at the west end of Old St Paul's Cathedral and was drawn in 1658 by Wenceslas Hollar, 8 years before its destruction in the Fire of London. The engraving was published in William Dugdale's 1658 work History of St Pauls Cathedral and states that the monument was positioned inter ecclesiae navim et alam australem ("between the nave of the Church and the south aisle").

== Sources ==
- Archives, National The. (2017). "Trafalgar Ancestors, Glossary". nationalarchives.gov.uk. National Archives. London. England
- Bothwell, James (2004). Edward III and the English Peerage: Royal Patronage, Social Mobility, and Political Control in Fourteenth-century England. Boydell Press. ISBN 9781843830474.
- Harari, Yuval Noah (2007). "For a Sack-full of Gold Écus: Calais 1350". In Harari, Yuval Noah (ed.). Special Operations in the Age of Chivalry 1100–1550. Woodbridge, Suffolk: Boydell Press. pp. 109–124. ISBN 978-1843832928.
- Houbraken, Jacobus. Thoyras, Paul de Rapin. Vertue, George. (1747). The History of England, A List of Admirals of England (1224–1745). England. Knapton. P and J.
- Mangone, Gerard J. (1997). United States Admiralty Law. Leiden, Netherlands: Martinus Nijhoff Publishers. ISBN 9041104178.
- Shaw, Wm. A. (1971). The Knights of England: A Complete Record from the Earliest Time to the Present Day of the Knights of All the Orders of Chivalry in England, Scotland, and Ireland, and of the Knights Bachelors. Baltimore: Genealogical Publishing Company. OCLC 247620448.
