= Admiral of the South, North and West =

Former English Navy senior appointment

Office of the Admiral of the South, North and West
- Reports to: Privy Council of England
- Nominator: Monarch of England
- Appointer: Monarch of England; Subject to formal approval by the King-in-Council
- Term length: Not fixed, (usually for life)
- Inaugural holder: John Beauchamp, 1st Baron Beauchamp of Warwick
- Formation: 1360
- Abolished: 1369

The Admiral of the South, North and West formally known as Admiral of the King's Southern, Northern and Western Fleets or Admiral of all the Fleets about England was a senior English Navy appointment and Commander-in-Chief of the English Navy from 1360 to 1369.

== History ==
From the end of the 13th century, the naval defence of England was divided into regional commands or 'admiralties' the Admiral of the North, the Admiral of the South and the Admiral of the West. The first royal commission as Admiral to a naval officer was granted in 1303. From 1328, the Admiralty of the South, its units, formations and staff, were merged with the Admiralty of the North until the end of the fourteenth century. By 1344 the appointment of an admiral was only used as a rank at sea for a captain in charge of a fleet or fleets.

The appointment of an admiral was not regarded by the English government at the time as an honorary post subordinate to a military rank. The importance attached to their office can be confirmed by their allowances, recorded in the Calendar of Patent Rolls. In the fourteenth century, admirals were paid a respectable salary which was only granted because the position was viewed as substantially important. In addition, the rank of admiral was only granted to men of high prestige within feudal hierarchy: most recipients of the office were at least knights and were more often earls.

On 18 July 1360 King Edward III of England appointed John Beauchamp, 1st Baron Beauchamp of Warwick by letters patent, formally 'Admiral of the King's Southern, Northern and Western Fleets' giving him sole command of the English Navy, effectively Admiral of the Fleet. Two further post holders would succeed Beauchamp.

The admiral's duties usually consisted of assembling fleets for naval expeditions undertaken by the monarch on campaign, maintaining order and discipline and supervising the work of the Admiralty courts for each region. On major military expeditions the admiral would go to sea with their fleets and accompany the overall Commander-in-Chief of both sea and land forces–usually the King himself but sometimes a nobleman of higher rank than the admiral. The admiral's role was to observe and direct naval battles but not necessarily take part in them themselves. From 1344 onward their role was moving from primarily an administrative one to that of a seagoing command.

In 1337 the first known record of the appointment of a "vice-admiral' was granted to a Nicholas Ususmaris, a Genoese, who was made Vice-Admiral of the King's fleet of galleys, and all other ships of Aquitaine. These appointments were few and far between. There was two further instances of the appointment of Vice-Admirals to Sir Thomas Drayton as Vice-Admiral of the Northern Fleet and Sir Peter Bard Vice-Admiral of the Western Fleet, both on 28 July 1338.

Special assistants were appointed to handle two important sub-divisions of the admiral's powers. The first was the admiral's lieutenant, or deputy, who handled administrative and legal duties and each of these admirals had one. In the early 15th century they were appointed on a more regular basis, referred to at this time as the admiral's Lieutenant-General; this office eventually became known as the Lieutenant of the Admiralty. The second was the Wardens of the Coast for each region who were responsible for the direction and coordination of the fleet, the equipping of boats and processing payments to sailors and superintendence of the Sea Guard Militia assigned to each coastal county. From the mid-fourteenth century there was a move to centralise these regional naval authorities as seen with the appointment of the Admiral of the Southern, Northern and Western fleets sometimes referred to as Admiral of the Fleet or Admiral of England and the Admiral of the North and West. This tendency toward unifying regional naval authorities under one admiral eventually led to the creation of the office of the Lord-Admiral of England

The admirals were logistically supported by the Clerk of the King's Ships who looked after all the navy's finances whilst victualling of the navy was handled by another one of King's Clerks.

== List ==
Post holders include:

Admirals of all the Fleets

- John Beauchamp, 1st Baron Beauchamp of Warwick, 18 July 1360 – 2 December 1360. (died in office).
- Sir Robert de Herle, 2 December 1360 - 7 July 1364. (died in office)
- Sir Ralph de Spigurnell, July 1364 - 1369 (retained title for life)

== See also ==
- Admiral of the Narrow Seas
- Admiral of the North
- Admiral of the North and West
- Admiral of the South
- Admiral of the West
- Lord High Admiral of England
