= William de Leybourne =

English knight and admiral (d. 1310)

Admiral Sir William de Leybourne
- Born: 1242; Leybourne Castle, Leybourne, Kent, England
- Died: March 18, 1310 (aged 67–68); Preston, near Wingham, Kent.
- Military career
- Allegiance: England
- Branch: Royal Navy
- Service years: 1265–1306
- Rank: Admiral
- Commands: Admiral of the English Seas; Admiral of the South; Admiral of the West; Admiral of the Irish Sea
- Conflicts: Battle off Bruges; Siege of Bayonne; Siege of Caerlaverock; Siege of Winchelsea

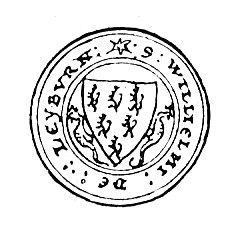
Seal of William de Leybourne, son of Roger, appended to the Barons' Letter, 1301

Admiral Sir William de Leybourne (French: Guillaume de Leybourne; Latin: Willelmus de Leyburnia or Leyburna; c. 1242–1310) was an English knight and military commander, sometimes reckoned the first admiral of the English navy.

== Life ==
William de Leybourne, first Baron Leybourne, was the eldest son of Roger de Leybourne from his marriage to Eleanor Ferrers. He married Juliana de Sandwich (1245–1327) on 16 October 1265. She was the heiress of Sir Henry de Sandwich, who had died when she was only four. William had three sons with Juliana, Thomas de Leybourne, Henry de Leybourne, John de Leybourne and three daughters, Idonea, Katherine and Joan. After his marriage William lived at his wife's manor of Preston-next-Wingham, Kent.

Sir William de Leybourne served as a military commander under the English kings Edward I and Edward II. In 1265, for his services during the Second Barons' War, he was given lands taken from Simon de Montfort's rebels. In 1266, he was left in command of Sandwich by his father and joined the Siege of Winchelsea.

In 1275 he was involved in a dispute with a Jewish moneylender over a large loan to his father. In 1278, he decided to sell the manor and Leeds Castle to Queen Eleanor, who cancelled all of his father's remaining debts.

He served in Wales in 1277 and in 1282 he was appointed Constable of Pevensey Castle. At some point thereafter, he was appointed commander of the king's own ships and ad hoc levies under a variety of titles that appear in various treaties and in items in the Gascon Rolls. He was noted as "Captain of the Sailors and Mariners of the Kingdom" (Capitaneus Nautarum & Marinellorum de Regno) in 1294, "admiral of our navy of England" (French: amiral de nostre navie d'Engleterre) in 1295, and "Admiral of the Sea of the King of England" (Amiral de la Mer du... Roy d'Engleterre) in 1297. The last is sometimes glossed as the later title "Admiral of the English Seas" (Latin: Admirallus Maris Angliae). Under any of these titles, he seems to have been commander-in-chief of the English Navy of the time and the prominence of this position has sometimes led to his inclusion on lists of the Lord High Admiral of England or even consideration as the first English admiral. In 1299 he also served in Scotland at the head of 5 knights and 59 esquires, and in 1300 he was in attendance at the Siege of Caerlaverock.

In the period leading up to the death of his first son Thomas in 1307, he bequeathed him and his wife Alice de Toeni, sister of Guy de Beauchamp, the manor of Leybourne. His second son Henry fought for the Earl of Lancaster at Battle of Boroughbridge, where he was taken prisoner and outlawed.

William de Leybourne died in 1310 leaving his granddaughter Juliana Leybourne (1303–1367) as his heir. Juliana Leybourne was to marry three times.

== Offices held ==
- Constable of Pevensey Castle, 1282–1287.
- Admiral of the English Seas, 1286–1298.
- Admiral of the South, 1294–1306.
- Admiral of the West, 1294–1306.
- Admiral of the Irish Sea, 1294–1306.

== See also ==
- Admiral of England
- Admiral of the North & of the West
- Admiral of the Fleet
