= Robert Hales (knight) =

English admiral (1325–1381)

Sir Robert Hales
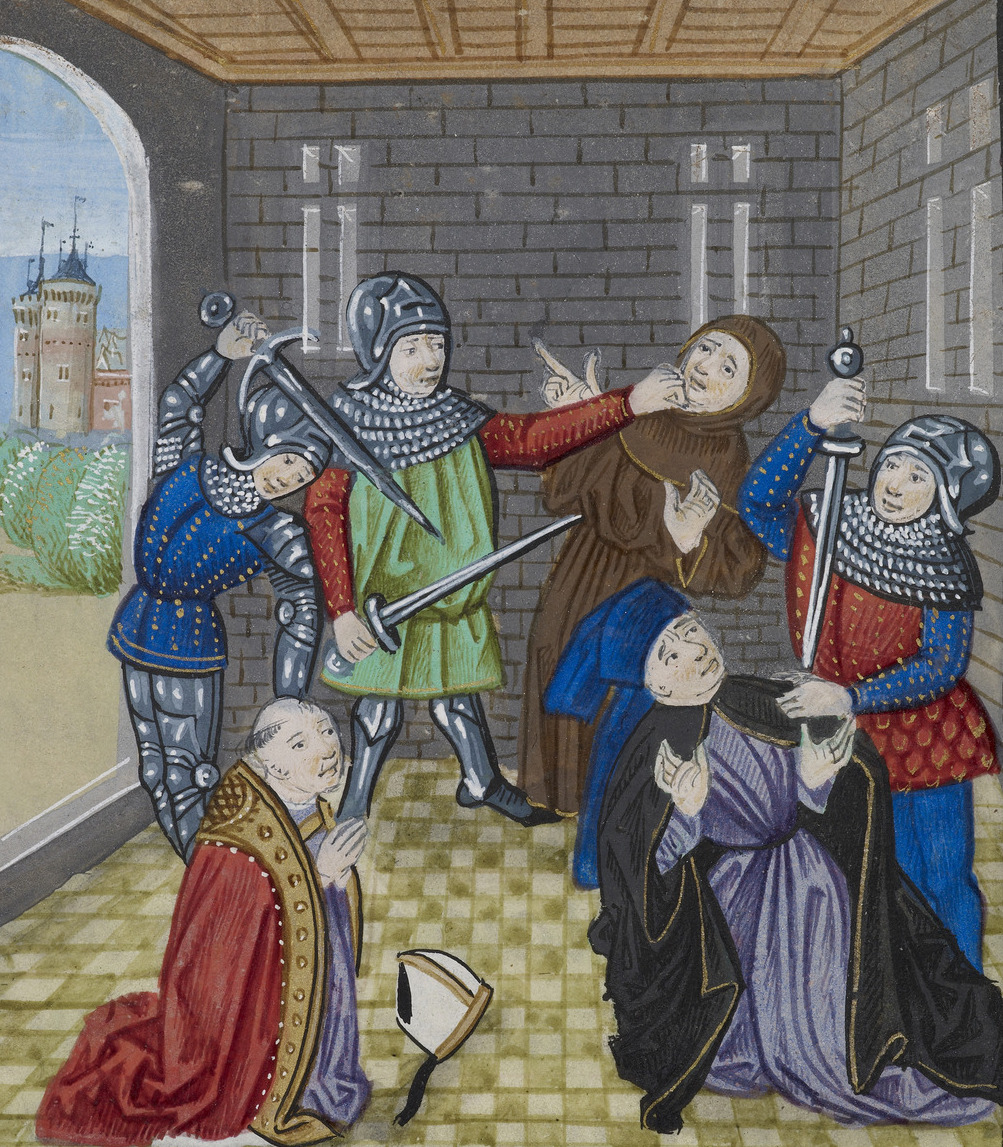
- The murder of Archbishop Simon Sudbury and Hales at the Tower of London
- Born: c. 1325; High Halden, Kent, England
- Died: 14 June 1381 (aged 55–56); Tower Hill, London, England
- Military career
- Service years: 1372–1377
- Rank: Admiral of the West

Sir Robert Hales (c. 1325 – 14 June 1381) was an English knight who served as Grand Prior (commander) of the Knights Hospitaller of England, Lord High Treasurer, and Admiral of the West. He was killed during the Peasants' Revolt alongside the Archbishop of Canterbury Simon Sudbury.

== Early life ==
Arms of Hales: Gules, three arrows or feathered and barbed argent

Hales was born to landowner Nicholas de Hales of High Halden in Kent in around 1325. His brother Sir Nicholas Hales who inherited both his estates as well as those of his father was the ancestor of several noteworthy branches of the Hales family including the three that later held baronetcies.

== Career ==
As a knight of the Knights Hospitaller, Sir Robert Hales was present at many latter-day crusader expeditions, and is recorded as leading a contingent of hospitaller knights at the sacking of Alexandria.

In 1372 Robert Hales became the Grand Prior (also known as Lord Prior) of the Knights Hospitallers of England and he was responsible for the expansion of the Clerkenwell Priory, the orders headquarters. He was appointed Admiral of the West and placed in command of the English navy's fleet based at Portsmouth, he served in this position from 24 November 1376 to 24 November 1377. In 1377 he was part of the escort of Pope Gregory XI during his journey from Avignon to Rome marking the return of the Papacy to Rome after almost 70 years in France. Richard II appointed him Lord High Treasurer responsible for managing the Royal Treasury, and thus was also responsible for collecting the much hated poll tax, although it had been passed by his predecessor. During the Peasants' Revolt, Wat Tyler and his rebel force set the headquarters of the English chapter of the Knights Hospitaller at Clerkenwell Priory alight. When King Richard left the Tower of London to parlay with Wat Tyler the drawbridge was left unraised. Whilst the King was still negotiating Tyler and a contingent of rebels were able to enter. Sir Robert was taken from the Tower of London along with the Archbishop of Canterbury Simon Sudbury and beheaded on 14 June 1381 on Tower Hill. His estate and assets were inherited by his brother, Sir Nicholas de Hales, the progenitor of many prominent English Hales families. On the day following his death some of Sir Robert Hales’ own servants (including one of his grooms) joined 20,000 rebels on a march to his country residence Highbury Manor House, described as being "built like another paradise", and set it on fire.

Hales was described by the chronicler Thomas Walsingham as a "Magnanimous knight, though the Commons loved him not".

Political offices
Preceded by Thomas Brantingham	Lord High Treasurer; 1381	Succeeded by Sir Hugh Segrave
Military offices
Preceded by William Montagu	Admiral of the West; 24 November 1376 – 24 November 1377	Succeeded by Michael de la Pole; Admiral of the North and West
