= Admiral Beaufort (disambiguation) =

Francis Beaufort (1774–1857) was a Royal Navy rear admiral. Admiral Beaufort may also refer to:

- John Beaufort, 1st Earl of Somerset (c. 1371–1410), Admiral of the Irish Fleet
- Thomas Beaufort, Duke of Exeter (c. 1377–1426), Admiral of the North and West
