= John Perbroun =

Admiral Sir John Perbroun
- Born: c. 1265; Great Yarmouth; Norfolk; England
- Died: c. 1342/3; Great Yarmouth; Norfolk; England
- Military career
- Allegiance: Kingdom of England
- Branch: English Navy
- Service years: 1308-1340
- Rank: Admiral
- Unit: Northern Fleet
- Commands: Admiral of the North; Admiral of the King's Fleet for Scotland
- Conflicts: Battle of Sluys

Admiral Sir John Perbroun or John de Perbroun, (c.1265 - d. 1342/3) was an English Knight, MP, merchant, ship owner and naval commander who served as Admiral of the North under King Edward III of England from (1322–1324) and again from (1327–1328, 1334–1335 ).

== Naval career ==
John Perbroun entered the Kings service around 1308 when he was a merchant ship owner based in Yarmouth. In 1322 he was appointed Admiral of the Northern Fleet until 1324. In 1326 he was order to attend the Kings Council in regard to a pending campaign to Scotland, he was instructed to requestion 40 ships of 60 guns each and be capable of carrying wine. In 1327 he was appointed for the second time to the command of the Northern Admiralty until 1328. In 1333 he was appointed Admiral of the King's Fleet for Scotland. In 1334 he was appointed Admiral of the Northern Fleet for the third time until 1335. In January 1340 King Edward III of England assumed the title King of France. In February 1340 he was ordered to attend the King in the planning of the Battle of Sluys which took place on 24 June 1340. The Northern Fleet was one of the formations that took part in the battle consisting of 50 ships under the command of Admiral Sir Robert, Lord Morley.

Prior to the creation of a single Admiralty Office in 1414 covering all of England, the English Navy was divided into geographical commands or Regional Admiralties.

== Civil career ==
Between 1285 and 1315 he was appointed Bailiff of Yarmouth. In 1335 was appointed for the last time Bailiff of Yarmouth along with Richard Fastolf, Robert Ellis and Thomas Drayton. He served as member of parliament for Great Yarmouth in 1322 and 1324.

== Family ==
He was the son of Robert Perbroun of Great Yarmouth, Norfolk.

== Bibliography ==
- Clowes, Sir William Laird. "The Royal Navy, a History from the Earliest Times to the Present/Volume 1". wikisource.org. London: Sampson Low Marston and Company. Retrieved 1 October 2019.
- Manship, Henry; Palmer, C. J. (1847). A Booke of the Foundacion and Antiquitye. Great Yarmouth: Charles Slowman. ISBN 9785883402905.
- Nicolas, Sir Nicholas Harris (1847). A History of the Royal Navy: From the Earliest Times to the Wars of the French Revolution. London: R. Bentley.
- "Perbroun [Perburn], John (d. 1342/3), merchant". Oxford Dictionary of National Biography (online ed.). Oxford University Press. 2019. doi:10.1093/ref:odnb/21908. (Subscription, Wikipedia Library access or UK public library membership required.)
- Rodger, N.A.M. (2004). The safeguard of the sea : a naval history of Britain. 660 to 1649. New York: W.W. Norton. ISBN 9780140297249.
- Seiler-Godfrey, Michelle Ann (1 August 2016). Constructing urban community: the ruling elite of late medieval England (Thesis). doi:10.17077/etd.29qfw61j. S2CID 158605688.
