= Ralph de Spigurnell =

14th century knight and naval officer

Sir Ralph de Spigurnell
- Born: c. 1317; Kent, England
- Died: 13 January 1373; Preston-next-Wingham, Kent, England
- Burial place: Greyfriars, London
- Military career
- Allegiance: England
- Branch: Royal Navy
- Service years: 1337-1373
- Rank: Admiral of the Fleet
- Commands: Admiral of all the Fleets; Warden of the Cinque Ports; Constable of Dover Castle

Admiral of the Fleet Sir Ralph de Spigurnell or Ralph Spigurnell (c. 1317–1373), was a Medieval knight, diplomatic envoy and English naval commander who was appointed Admiral of all the Fleets of the English Navy, Warden of the Cinque Ports and Constable of Dover Castle who served under King Edward III of England from 1337 to 1373.

== Career ==
The first known account of Ralph Spigurnell appears in April 1337 when he was part of a group of advisers to the Bishop of Lincoln, under orders from King Edward III who was sent along with the Earl of Huntington and Earl of Salisbury to officiate the marriage between the eldest son of the Count of Flanders, Louis II and the Princess Joan. In November 1344 by this time knighted he was sent on a mission as Envoy of the King to see Pope Clement VI.

During the 1350s he advanced up the ranks as part of the household Roger Mortimer the Young. In 1355 he then served as deputy to the Earl of March and in 1359 he entered Royal service. In December 1359 he was appointed a justice of the peace to try felonies being committed in County Hereford and County Kent. On 1 May 1360 he and Sir John Buckingham were authorized to remove the King of France from Somerton Castle to transport him to Berkhamsted Castle, this was in response to a feared invasion. In October 1360 accompanying the Prince of Wales he was present at the signing of the Treaty of Brétigny.

On 7 July 1364 he was appointed Admiral of the South, North and West succeeding Admiral of the Fleet Sir Robert de Herle. He was additionally appointed Warden of the Cinque Ports, and Constable of Dover Castle. He was succeeded as Warden of the Cinque Ports, between 10 May and 6 July 1370, by Sir Richard de Penbrugge.

Sir Ralph Spigurnell died on 13 January 1373 and was interned at Greyfriars, London he left his estate to his widow .

== Family ==
There are no records to ascertain who his parents were but records do exist of possible relatives such as Sir Henry Spigurnell, a justice of the King's Bench may have been his father and a Sir John Spigurnell of Buckinghamshire, who were noted in official documents as living during the reign of King Edward II. He died on 13 January 1373. At the time of his death he was married to Elizabeth de Spigurnell who was residing in the Manor of Selgrave she sold the estate in 1397 to the Prior and Convent of Christchurch in Canterbury.

== Bibliography ==
1. Chaplais, Pierre (2003). English diplomatic practice in the Middle Ages. London, England: A&C Black. ISBN 9781852853952.
2. Cushway, Graham (2011). Edward III and the war at sea : the English Navy, 1327–1377. Woodbridge, England: Boydell Press. ISBN 9781843836216.
3. Hardy, Thomas Duffus (1869). Calendar of State Papers: Vol 1, 1066 to 1377. London, England: Longman's Green and Co.
4. Harris, Sir Nicholas (1847). A History of the Royal Navy: 1327–1422. London, England: R. Bentley.
5. Edward Hasted, The History and Topographical Survey of the County of Kent: Volume 6 (Canterbury, 1798), British History Online http://www.british-history.ac.uk/survey-kent/vol6 [accessed 21 February 2019].
6. Tucker, St George (1996). Blackstone's commentaries (in Introduction). Clark, New Jersey, USA.: The Lawbook Exchange, Ltd. ISBN 9781886363168.
