= Lord High Admiral =

Lord High Admiral can refer to:

- Lord High Admiral of the United Kingdom (of England until 1707, of Great Britain until 1709, and of the United Kingdom from 1964 to date)
- Lord High Admiral of Scotland
- Lord High Admiral of the Wash
- Lord High Admiral of Sweden
- Lord High Admiral, Pimlico, London public house

== See also ==
- First Lord of the Admiralty
- List of lords commissioners of the Admiralty
