= High Admiral =

High Admiral may refer to:

- A rank in the Star Wars fictional universe
- A rank in the Honorverse fictional universe

== See also ==
- Lord High Admiral (disambiguation)
- Admiral of France (Amiral de France), head of the French Navy
