= Admiral of the Fleet (Royal Navy) =

Highest officer rank of the Royal Navy

Admiral of the fleet
- Shoulder board and sleeve lace with royal cypher

- Distinguishing flag

- Motor car star plate
- Country: United Kingdom
- Service branch: Royal Navy
- Abbreviation: AdmF
- Rank group: Officers of flag rank
- Rank: Five-star rank
- NATO rank code: OF-10
- Formation: 1688
- Next lower rank: Admiral
- Equivalent ranks: Field Marshal (British Army); Marshal of the Royal Air Force (RAF)

Admiral of the Fleet (ADMF) is a five-star naval officer rank and the highest rank of the Royal Navy, formally established in 1688. The five-star NATO rank code is OF-10, equivalent to a field marshal in the British Army or a marshal of the Royal Air Force. Apart from honorary appointments, no new admirals of the fleet have been named since 1995, and no honorary appointments have been made since 2014.

== History ==
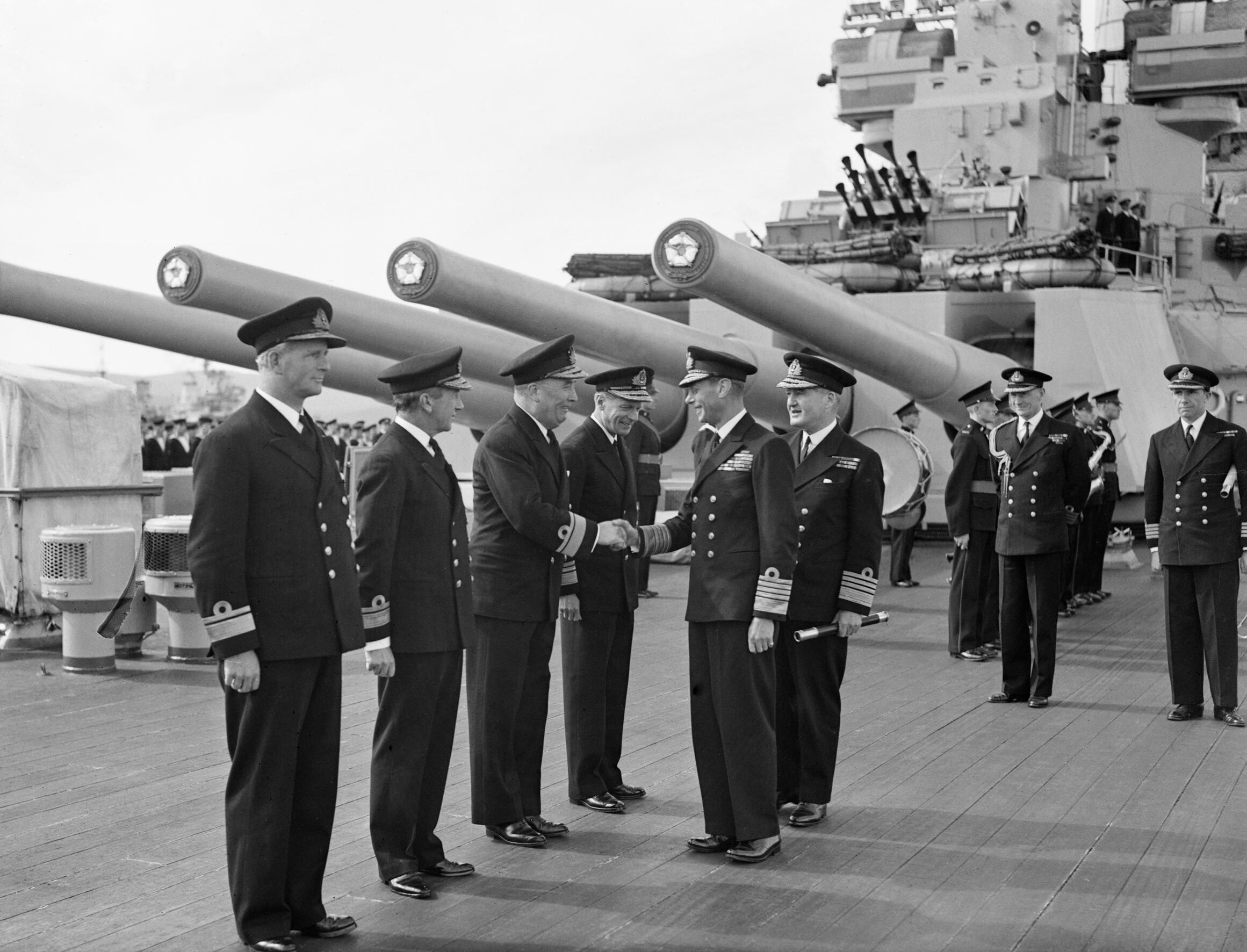
King George VI and Admiral Sir Bruce Fraser aboard HMS Duke of York at Scapa Flow, August 1943. The King is wearing the uniform of an admiral of the fleet.

The origins of the rank can be traced back to John Beauchamp, 1st Baron Beauchamp of Warwick, who was appointed 'Admiral of the King's Southern, Northern and Western Fleets' on 18 July 1360. The appointment gave the command of the English navy to one person for the first time; this evolved into the post of admiral of the fleet. In the days of sailing ships the admiral distinctions then used by the Royal Navy included distinctions related to the fleet being divided into three divisions – red, white, or blue. Each division was assigned at least one admiral, who in turn commanded a number of vice-admirals and rear admirals. While the full admirals were nominally equals, tradition gave precedence to the admiral of the white who held the fleet rank in addition to his substantive role.

=== 17th to 19th centuries ===
The Restoration era brought a general reorganisation of naval ranks and structure, including formalisation of the admiral of the fleet role. In a break with tradition, the rank was awarded to the most senior admiral of the red, who retained this substantive rank while also serving as admiral of the Fleet. Appointments were for life, remunerated via a £5 daily stipend and an annual allowance of £1,014 for the hiring and maintenance of servants. It was intended that only one officer would hold the rank at any time, with their presence aboard any naval vessel to be denoted by the flying of the Royal Standard from the main mast.

The ranks of admiral of the Fleet and admiral of the red were formally separated from 1805, with an announcement in the London Gazette that "His Majesty [has] been pleased to order the Rank of Admirals of the Red to be restored" in His Majesty's Navy..." as a separate role. The same Gazette promoted 22 men to that rank. From the 19th century onward there were also occasional variations to the previous requirement that only one admiral of the fleet could serve at a time. In 1821, George IV appointed Sir John Jervis as a second admiral of the fleet, to balance the Duke of Wellington's promotion as a second Field Marshal in the British Army. In 1830, King William IV increased the number of admirals of the fleet to three, though these additional lifetime postings subsequently lapsed. Between 1854 and 1857 there was no admiral of the fleet at all, as the most senior naval officer of the time, Admiral of the Red Thomas Le Marchant Gosselin, was mentally ill and had not served at sea for forty-five years. In deference to Gosselin's seniority, the position was instead left vacant until his death in 1857, when it was filled by Admiral Sir Charles Ogle.

=== 20th and 21st centuries ===
The organisation of the British fleet into coloured squadrons was abandoned in 1864, though the rank of admiral of the fleet was maintained. The title of First Naval Lord was renamed First Sea Lord in 1904.

During the two World Wars a number of serving officers held active commissions as admirals of the fleet, as well as First Sea Lord—for example, Sir John Tovey.

Prince Philip, Duke of Edinburgh, was created an admiral of the fleet in the Royal New Zealand Navy in 1954, following the coronation of his wife Elizabeth II as Queen. This promotion was to a New Zealand rank, separate from the Royal Navy rank.

Following the creation of the Chief of the Defence Staff in 1959, the five naval officers appointed to that position became admirals of the fleet. Recognizing the reduced post-Cold War size of the British Armed Forces, no further appointments were made to the rank after 1995 (when Sir Benjamin Bathurst was appointed admiral of the fleet upon his retirement as First Sea Lord). The rank was not abolished, and in 2012 the Prince of Wales (now King Charles III) became an honorary admiral of the fleet (as well as an honorary field marshal of the Army and honorary marshal of the Royal Air Force), in recognition of his support to Queen Elizabeth II in her role of as Commander-in-Chief of the British Armed Forces. In 2014, Lord Boyce, a former First Sea Lord and Chief of the Defence Staff, was also appointed an honorary admiral of the fleet.

== Admirals of the Fleet ==
Appointed	Image	Name	Born	Died	Notes	Ref.
24 September 1688		George Legge (later The Lord Dartmouth)	1647	1691		
30 May 1690		Edward Russell (later The Earl of Orford)	1652	1727		
28 April 1696		Sir George Rooke	1650	1709	circa	
13 January 1705		Sir Cloudesley Shovell	1650	1707		
8 January 1708		Sir John Leake	1656	1720		
21 December 1708		Sir Stafford Fairborne	1666	1742	circa	
12 November 1709		Sir Matthew Aylmer (later The Lord Aylmer)	1650	1720		
14 March 1718		Sir George Byng (later The Viscount Torrington)	1663	1733		
20 February 1734		Sir John Norris	1670	1749		
1 July 1749		Sir Chaloner Ogle	1681	1750		
22 November 1751		James Steuart	1690	1757		
March 1757		George Clinton	1686	1761		
30 July 1761		The Lord Anson	1697	1762		
17 December 1762		Sir William Rowley	1690	1768	circa	
15 January 1768		Sir Edward Hawke (later The Lord Hawke)	1705	1781		
24 October 1781		John Forbes	1714	1796		
12 March 1796		The Earl Howe	1726	1799		
16 September 1799		Sir Peter Parker, Bt.	1721	1811		
24 December 1811		King William IV	1765	1837	Lord High Admiral of the United Kingdom 1827–1828 appointed at that time as The Duke of Clarence and St Andrews	
19 July 1821		The Earl of St Vincent	1735	1823	acting from May 1814	
28 June 1830		William Williams-Freeman	1742	1832		
22 July 1830		The Lord Gambier	1756	1833		
22 July 1830		Sir Charles Pole, Bt.	1757	1830		
24 April 1833		Sir Charles Nugent	1759	1844		
8 January 1844		Sir James Hawkins-Whitshed	1762	1849		
9 November 1846		Sir George Martin	1764	1847		
13 October 1849		Sir Thomas Byam Martin	1773	1854		
1 July 1851		Sir George Cockburn (later the Cockburn Baronet)	1772	1853		
8 December 1857		Sir Charles Ogle, Bt.	1775	1858		
25 June 1858		Sir John West	1774	1862		
20 May 1862		Sir William Gage	1777	1864		
10 November 1862		Sir Graham Hamond, Bt.	1779	1862		
27 April 1863		Sir Francis Austen	1774	1865		
27 April 1863		Sir William Parker, Bt.	1781	1866		
11 January 1864		Sir Lucius Curtis	1786	1869		
12 September 1865		Sir Thomas Cochrane	1789	1872		
30 November 1866		Sir George Seymour	1787	1870		
30 January 1868		Sir James Gordon	1782	1869	On the Reserved List	
15 January 1869		Sir William Bowles	1780	1869		
2 July 1869		Sir George Sartorius	1790	1885		
21 January 1870		Sir Fairfax Moresby	1786	1877		
20 October 1872		Sir Houston Stewart	1791	1875		
11 December 1875		Sir Provo Wallis	1791	1892		
22 January 1877		Sir Henry Codrington	1808	1877		
5 August 1877		Sir Henry Keppel	1809	1904		
27 December 1877		The Earl of Lauderdale	1803	1878		
27 December 1877		Sir Rodney Mundy	1805	1884		
15 June 1879		Sir James Hope	1808	1881		
15 June 1879		Sir Thomas Symonds	1813	1894		
10 June 1881		Sir Alexander Milne, Bt.	1806	1896	On the Retired List	
1 December 1881		Sir Charles Elliot	1818	1895		
29 April 1885		Sir Alfred Ryder	1820	1888		
18 July 1887		King Edward VII	1841	1910	Honorary appointment to non-Navy royalty and at that time The Prince of Wales	
1 May 1888		Sir Geoffrey Hornby	1825	1895		
8 December 1888		Lord John Hay	1827	1916	First Naval Lord 1886	
2 August 1889		Emperor William II	1859	1941	Honorary, to foreign royalty	
13 February 1892		Sir John Commerell	1829	1901		
3 June 1893		The Duke of Edinburgh (later The Duke of Saxe-Coburg and Gotha)	1844	1900		
20 February 1895		The Earl of Clanwilliam	1832	1907		
23 August 1897		Sir Algernon Lyons	1833	1908		
29 November 1898		Sir Frederick Richards	1833	1912	First Naval Lord 1893–1899	
13 January 1899		Sir Nowell Salmon	1835	1912		
3 October 1902		Sir James Erskine	1838	1911		
30 August 1903		Sir Charles Hotham	1843	1925		
16 June 1904		Lord Walter Kerr	1839	1927	First Sea Lord 1899–1904	
20 February 1905		Sir Edward Seymour	1840	1929		
5 December 1905		Sir John Fisher (later The Lord Fisher)	1841	1920	First Sea Lord 1905–1910 and 1914–1915	
1 March 1907		Sir Arthur Wilson	1842	1921	First Sea Lord 1910–1911	
11 June 1908		Tsar Nicholas II of Russia	1868	1918	Honorary, to foreign royalty	
2 December 1908		Sir Gerard Noel	1845	1918		
27 January 1910		Prince Henry of Prussia	1862	1929	Honorary, to foreign royalty	
30 April 1910		Sir Arthur Fanshawe	1847	1936		
7 May 1910		King George V	1865	1936		
20 March 1913		Sir William May	1849	1930		
5 March 1915		Sir Hedworth Meux	1856	1929		
2 April 1917		Sir George Callaghan	1852	1920		
3 April 1919		The Viscount Jellicoe (later The Earl Jellicoe)	1859	1935	First Sea Lord 1916–1918	
3 April 1919		Sir David Beatty (later The Earl Beatty)	1871	1936	First Sea Lord 1919–1927	
31 July 1919		Sir Henry Jackson	1855	1929	First Sea Lord 1915–1916	
1 November 1919		Sir Rosslyn Wemyss (later The Lord Wester Wemyss)	1864	1933	First Sea Lord 1918–1919	
24 November 1920		Sir Cecil Burney (later the Burney baronet)	1858	1929		
5 July 1921		Sir Doveton Sturdee, Bt.	1859	1925		
19 August 1921		The Marquess of Milford Haven	1854	1921	First Sea Lord 1912–1914. On the Retired List	
31 July 1924		Sir Charles Madden, Bt.	1862	1935	First Sea Lord 1927–1930	
8 May 1925		Sir Somerset Gough-Calthorpe	1864	1937		
24 November 1925		Sir John de Robeck, Bt.	1862	1928		
21 January 1928		Sir Henry Oliver	1865	1965		
31 July 1929		Sir Osmond Brock	1869	1947		
8 May 1930		Sir Roger Keyes, Bt. (later The Lord Keyes)	1872	1945		
21 January 1933		Sir Frederick Field	1871	1945	First Sea Lord 1930–1933	
31 July 1934		Sir Reginald Tyrwhitt, Bt.	1870	1951		
8 May 1935		Sir Ernle Chatfield (later The Lord Chatfield)	1873	1967	First Sea Lord 1933–1938	
21 January 1936		King Edward VIII	1894	1972		
12 July 1936		Sir John Kelly	1871	1936		
11 December 1936		King George VI	1895	1952		
21 January 1938		The Earl of Cork and Orrery	1873	1967		
29 June 1939		Sir Roger Backhouse	1878	1939	First Sea Lord 1938–1939. On the Retired List	Order in Council of 3 July 1939
31 July 1939		Sir Dudley Pound	1877	1943	First Sea Lord 1939–1943	
8 May 1940		Sir Charles Forbes	1880	1960		
21 January 1943		Sir Andrew Cunningham (later The Viscount Cunningham of Hyndhope)	1883	1963	First Sea Lord 1943–1946	
22 October 1943		Sir John Tovey (later The Lord Tovey)	1885	1971		
8 May 1945		Sir James Somerville	1882	1949		
21 January 1948		Sir John Cunningham	1885	1965	First Sea Lord 1946–1948	
22 October 1948		The Lord Fraser of North Cape	1888	1981	First Sea Lord 1948–1951	
20 March 1949		Sir Algernon Willis	1889	1976		
22 April 1952		Sir Arthur Power	1889	1960		
1 June 1952		Sir Philip Vian	1894	1968		
15 January 1953		The Duke of Edinburgh	1921	2021	Lord High Admiral of the United Kingdom 2011–2021	
1 May 1953		Sir Rhoderick McGrigor	1893	1959	First Sea Lord 1951–1955	
22 April 1955		Sir George Creasy	1895	1972		
22 October 1956		The Earl Mountbatten of Burma	1900	1979	First Sea Lord 1955–1959; Chief of the Defence Staff 1959–1965	
10 May 1960		Sir Charles Lambe	1900	1960	First Sea Lord 1959–1960	
23 May 1962		Sir Caspar John	1903	1984	First Sea Lord 1960–1963	
12 August 1968		Sir Varyl Begg	1908	1995	First Sea Lord 1966–1968	
30 June 1970		Sir Michael Le Fanu	1913	1970	First Sea Lord 1968–1970	
12 March 1971		Sir Peter Hill-Norton (later The Lord Hill-Norton)	1915	2004	First Sea Lord 1970–1971; Chief of the Defence Staff 1971–1973	
1 March 1974		Sir Michael Pollock	1916	2006	First Sea Lord 1971–1974	
9 February 1977		Sir Edward Ashmore	1919	2016	First Sea Lord 1974–1977; Chief of the Defence Staff 1977	
6 July 1979		Sir Terence Lewin (later The Lord Lewin)	1920	1999	First Sea Lord 1977–1979; Chief of the Defence Staff 1979–1982	
1 December 1982		Sir Henry Leach	1923	2011	First Sea Lord 1979–1982	
2 August 1985		Sir John Fieldhouse (later The Lord Fieldhouse)	1928	1992	First Sea Lord 1982–1985; Chief of the Defence Staff 1985–1988	
12 April 1988		King Olav V of Norway	1903	1991	Honorary, to foreign royalty	
25 May 1989		Sir William Staveley	1928	1997	First Sea Lord 1985–1989	
2 March 1993		Sir Julian Oswald	1933	2011	First Sea Lord 1989–1993	
10 July 1995		Sir Benjamin Bathurst	1936	2025	First Sea Lord 1993–1995	
16 June 2012		King Charles III	1948	Living	Lord High Admiral of the United Kingdom since 2022; Honorary appointment and at that time The Prince of Wales; Assumed the rank in full capacity on the day following accession to the throne. (Ex officio)	
13 June 2014		The Lord Boyce	1943	2022	First Sea Lord 1998–2001; Chief of the Defence Staff 2001–2003. Honorary rank	

== See also ==
- Admiral of the fleet as used in other countries
- British ensigns
- British and U.S. military ranks compared
- Coloured squadrons of the Royal Navy
- Comparative military ranks
- First Sea Lord
- Lord High Admiral of the United Kingdom
- Royal Navy officer rank insignia
