= Knights of the Hare =

Alleged English order of chivalry

Knights of the Hare was a chivalric order of twelve to fourteen knights that was allegedly created by the King Edward III of England. In fact, the title is a humorous reference to an incident during the early stages of the Hundred Years War.

== The origin of the Knights of the Hare ==
At the beginning of the Hundred Years' War Edward III and Philip VI of France both assembled armies in France, but they did not engage in any decisive battle. On 23 October 1339, both armies were formed in sight of each other in the fields between La Flamengerie and Buironfosse, when a hare, caught in the field between them, started running towards the French lines. The French troops greeted the approaching hare with a lot of noise. Some troops at the rear of the French formation mistook the noise as a sign of an imminent English attack and prepared for battle. As a preparation for the battle the William II, Count of Hainaut quickly knighted 14 distinguished squires as was the common chivalric custom. However the English attack never came and, after the reason for that became clear, those knights became known as the Knights of the Hare.

As the knights were created on the French side, it is doubtful however, whether Edward III really created a formal order for those knights. The confusion may have occurred because Edward III also knighted a number of esquires before the battle, including the later famous soldier Sir John Chandos

== Historical sources ==
- Jean Froissart
