= Admiral of the North and West =

Former English Navy post

Office of the Admiral of the North and West
- Admiralty North and West
- Reports to: Privy Council of England
- Nominator: Monarch of England
- Appointer: Monarch of England; Subject to formal approval by the King-in-Council
- Term length: Not fixed, (usually for life)
- Inaugural holder: Admiral Sir Ralph de Spigurnell
- Formation: 1364
- Abolished: 1414
- Superseded by: High Admiral of England, Ireland and Aquitaine

The Admiral of the North and West or Admiral of the North and Western Fleets was a former senior appointment of the English Navy. The post holder was Commander-in-Chief of the English navy's North and Western Fleets operating in the North Sea, the English Channel, the Southern Irish Sea and Atlantic from 1364 to 1414.

== History ==
The origins of the office Admiral of the North and West dates back to 7 July 1364 with appointment of Sir Ralph de Spigurnell, originally styled Admiral of the North and West Sea. The office was styled by different names from its establishment such as Admiral of the North and West Stations. From 28 April 1369 to 24 November 1377 there was no further appointments until the post was revived with the appointment of Michael, Lord Wingfield he held the office very briefly until December 1377 when it once again ceased. On 10 December 1386 it was revived again with the appointment of Richard FitzAlan, Earl of Arundel he held the post until 18 May 1389. There would be a further four appointments from May 1389 to April 1400 before the office ceased again. It was established for the final time on 23 December 1406 the command being given to John Beaufort, 1st Earl of Somerset. The last Commander-in-Chief was Thomas Beaufort, Earl of Dorset, from 1408 until 1414. It was considered one the English Navy's most important Naval Commands from the mid-14th century until the beginning of the 15th century.

Two of the office holders Sir John Beaufort, 1st Earl of Somerset and Thomas Beaufort, Earl of Dorset both retained the title for life. The first royal commission as Admiral to a naval officer was granted in 1303. By 1344 it was only used as a rank at sea for a captain in charge of a fleet or fleets.

Rank and Role

The naval defence of England from the end of the 13th century was divided into regional commands or 'admiralties' until the end of the fourteenth Century. The appointment of an admiral was not regarded by the English government at the time as an honorary post subordinate to a military rank, their importance attached to their office can be confirmed by the recording of their allowances paid recorded in the Calendar of Patent Rolls. In the fourteenth Century Admirals were paid a respectable salary which was only granted because the position was viewed as substantially important. In addition the rank of admiral was only granted to men of high prestige within feudal hierarchy, most recipients of the office were usually knights but more often earls. The Admirals duties usually consisted of assembling fleets for naval expeditions undertaken by the monarch on campaign, maintaining order and discipline and supervising the work of the Admiralty Courts for each region. On major military expeditions the Admiral would go to sea with their fleets and accompany the overall Commander-in-Chief of both sea and land forces usually the King himself but sometimes a nobleman of higher rank than the admiral. Their role was to observe and direct naval battles but not necessarily taking part in them, themselves. However, from 1344 onward their role was moving from primarily administrative role to that of a sea of a seagoing command.

In 1337 the first known record of the appointment of a "vice-admiral' was granted to a Nicholas Ususmaris, a Genoese, he was made Vice-Admiral of the King's fleet of galleys, and all other ships of Aquitaine. However these appointments were few and far between. There was two further instances of the appointment of Vice-Admirals to Sir Thomas Drayton as Vice-Admiral of the Northern Fleet and Sir Peter Bard Vice-Admiral of the Western Fleet both on 28 July 1338.

Special assistants were appointed to handle two important sub-divisions of the admirals powers. The first was the admiral's lieutenant, or deputy, referred to as sub-admirals, who handled administrative and legal duties and each of these admirals had one and often retained more knowledge than the Admiral himself in relation to the sea and coastal communities. It would not be until the early 15th century that they would appointed on a more regular basis however they were referred to at this time as the admirals Lieutenant-General this office eventually became known as the Lieutenant of the Admiralty.

The second was the Wardens of the Coast for each region who were responsible for the direction and co-ordination of the fleet, the equipping of boats and processing payments to sailors and superintendence of the Sea Guard Militia assigned to each coastal county. From the mid fourteenth century there was a move to centralise these regional naval authorities as seen with the appointment of the Admiral of the Southern, Northern and Western fleets sometimes referred to as Admiral of the Fleet or Admiral of England and the Admiral of the North and West this tendency towards unifying regional naval authorities under one admiral eventually led to the creation of the office of the Lord-Admiral of England

The Admirals were logistically supported by the Clerk of the King's Ships who looked after all the navy's finances whilst victualling of the navy was handled by another one of King's Clerks.

== Admirals of the North and West ==
Includes:

- Admiral Sir Ralph de Spigurnell, Baron Spigurnell — 7 July 1364 - 28 April 1369.

No appointments

- Admiral Michael, Lord Wingfield — 24 November 1377 - 5 December 1377.

No appointments

- Admiral Richard FitzAlan, 4th Earl of Arundel — 10 December 1386 - 18 May 1389.
- Admiral Sir John Roches — 21 May 1389 - 22 June 1389
- High Admiral Edward, Earl of Rutland and Duke of Abermarle — 29 November 1391 - 9 May 1397.
- High Admiral Sir John Beaufort, 1st Earl of Somerset — 9 May 1398 - 15 November 1399. (was bestowed title for life)
- Admiral Sir Thomas Percy, 1st Earl of Worcester — 15 November 1399 - 21 April 1400.

No appointments

- Admiral Sir John Beaufort, 1st Earl of Somerset — 23 December 1406 - 8 May 1407.
- Admiral Sir Thomas Beaufort, Earl of Dorset — 21 September 1408 - 3 June 1414, (was bestowed title for life)

Note: The office was amalgamated into a single office of the High Admiral of England, Ireland and Aquitaine in 1414.

== See also ==
- Admiral of the Narrow Seas
- Admiral of the North
- Admiral of the West
- Admiral of the South
- Admiral of all the Fleets
