= Thomas Beaufort, Duke of Exeter =

English military commander

Thomas Beaufort
- Duke of Exeter
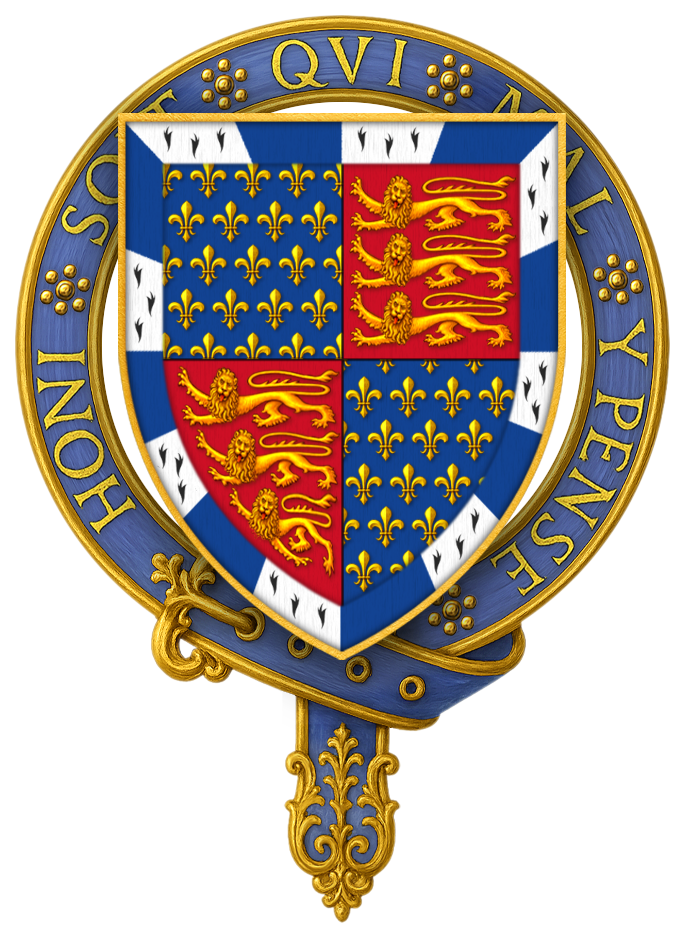
- Arms of Thomas Beaufort, Duke of Exeter
- Born: c. January 1377; Château de Beaufort, Anjou, France
- Died: 30 or 31 December 1426 (age 49 or 50); Greenwich manor, Kent, England
- Buried: Bury St Edmunds Abbey, Suffolk
- Family: Beaufort
- Spouse: Margaret Neville of Hornby
- Issue: Henry Beaufort (died in infancy)
- Father: John of Gaunt
- Mother: Katherine Swynford
- Occupation: Lord Chancellor; Lord High Admiral; Admiral of the North and West; Admiral of the North; Captain of Calais

Thomas Beaufort, Duke of Exeter (c. January 1377 – 30/31 December 1426) was an English military commander during the Hundred Years' War, and briefly Chancellor of England. He was the third of the four children born to John of Gaunt, Duke of Lancaster, and his mistress Katherine Swynford. To overcome their problematic parentage, his parents were married in 1396, and he and his siblings were legitimated in 1390 and again in 1397. He married the daughter of Sir Thomas Neville (died 1387) of Hornby, Margaret Neville (born c. 1384). They had one son, Henry Beaufort, who died young.

== Under Henry IV ==
After the accession of his half-brother Henry IV, Beaufort was made a Knight of the Garter. In the following years he held various military posts: constable of Ludlow (1402), appointed Admiral of the North (1403), appointed captain of Calais (1407), and Admiral of the North and West (1408–1413) he retained the title for life. His most notable action during this decade was commanding the forces against the northern rebellion of 1405.

He became Chancellor of England on 31 January 1410, an office he held until 5 January 1412 during a time when King Henry was having trouble with the clergy, and then returned to military matters. Later in 1412 he was created Earl of Dorset.

== Under Henry V ==
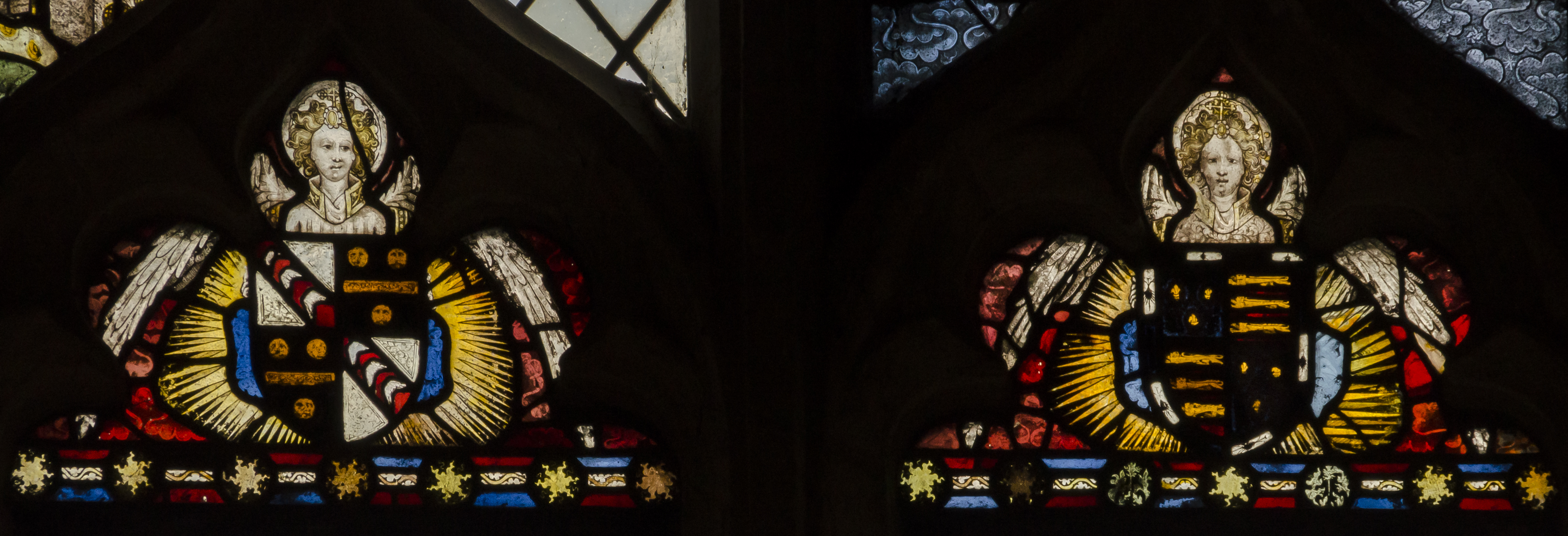
Stained glass in Salle, Norfolk with arms of Duke of Exeter (right), next to that of William "Jackanapes" de la Pole, Duke of Suffolk.

On the accession of Henry V, Beaufort was appointed Lieutenant of Aquitaine in 1413 and then captain of Harfleur in 1415. He spent the next few years in Normandy, serving as lieutenant of that duchy from 1416. He was created Duke of Exeter for life that same year.

Beaufort returned to England in 1417 while the king was still in Normandy in order to deal with problems in Scotland. In 1418, he went back to Normandy with a large force, taking part in the sieges of Évreux, Ivry, and Rouen. After the fall of Rouen in 1419, he was made captain of the city and conquered several more of the smaller Norman cities. Finally, in 1419, he took the great fortress of Château Gaillard, midway between Rouen and Paris, after a six-month siege.

During this time, Henry V began a policy of creating Norman titles for his aristocrats, with Beaufort being made Count of Harcourt in 1418.

In 1420, Beaufort helped negotiate the treaty of Troyes, but was not present the following year at the Battle of Baugé, where his nephew Clarence was killed and his two Beaufort nephews, John of Somerset and Edmund Beaufort were captured.

Beaufort was one of the executors of Henry V's will, and so returned to England in 1422 after the latter's death. He served on the governing council for the infant King Henry VI, though it is likely he spent some time in France as well.

The character of Exeter in Shakespeare's play Henry V is based on Beaufort, although Beaufort was not actually created duke of Exeter until after the Battle of Agincourt; in 1415 he was still earl of Dorset. He also appears in Henry VI, Part 1.

He died at the end of December 1426 and was buried the following week. All of his titles (Duke of Exeter, Earl of Dorset and Count of Harcourt) became extinct. The Duchy of Exeter was restored to the Holland family; the Earldom of Dorset was recreated for Edmund, Count of Mortain, his nephew.

== Arms ==
As a legitimated grandson of the sovereign, Beaufort bore the arms of the kingdom, differenced by a bordure gobony azure and ermine.

== See also ==
- List of lord chancellors and lord keepers

== Footnotes ==
Political offices
Preceded by Thomas Arundel	Lord Chancellor; 31 January 1410 – 5 January 1412	Succeeded by Thomas Arundel
Preceded by Edward of Norwich	Lord High Admiral; 1413 – 26 July 1426	Succeeded by The Duke of Bedford
Peerage of England
New creation	Duke of Exeter; 18 November 1416 – 1426	Extinct
New creation	Earl of Dorset; 5 July 1411 – 1426	Extinct
French nobility
New creation	Count of Harcourt; Lord of Lillebonne; 1 July 1418 – 1426	Extinct
