= John Botetourt, 1st Baron Botetourt =

English military commander (died 1324)

John Botetourt
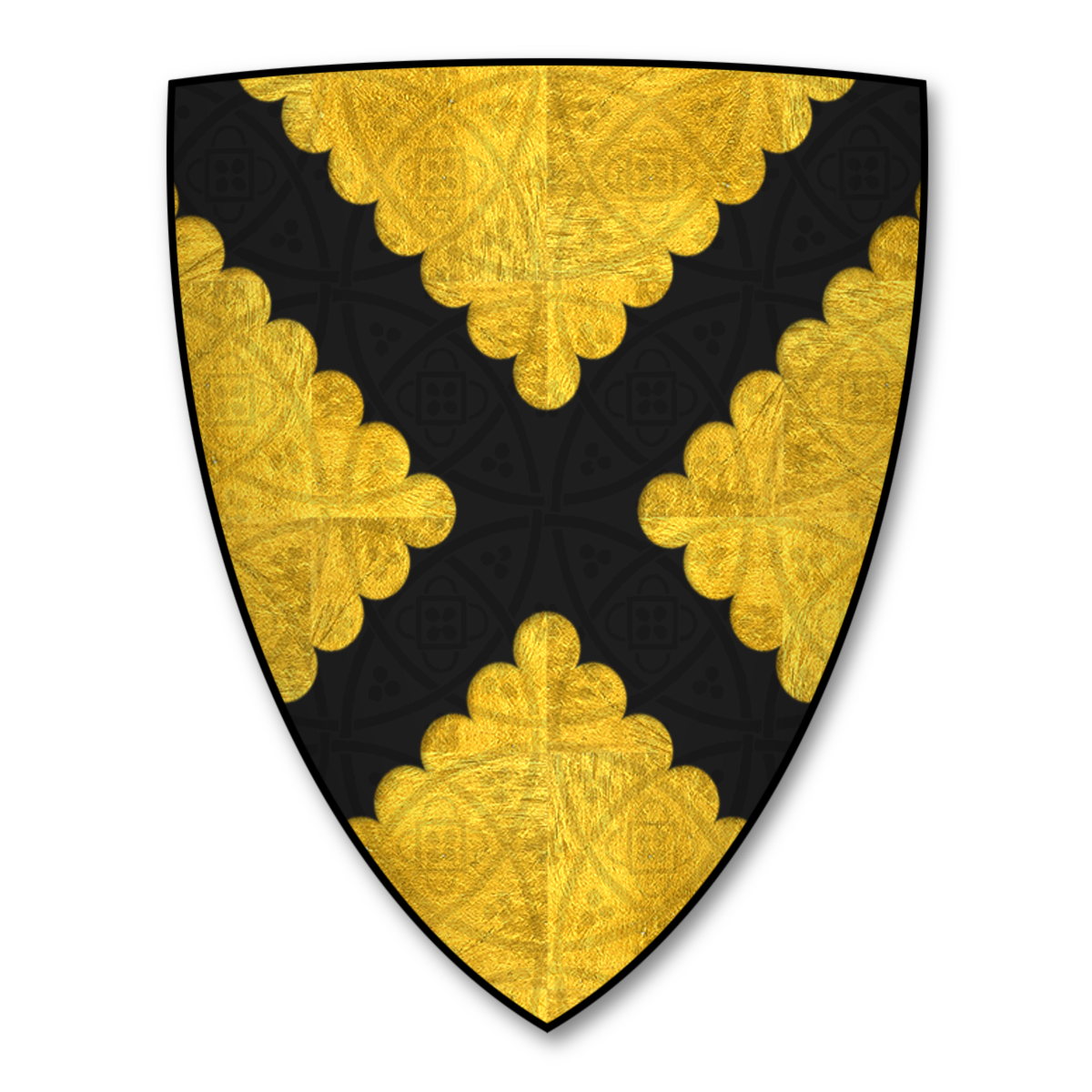
- Born: c.1265
- Died: 25 November 1324
- Spouse: Matilda fitz Thomas
- Parent: Guy Botetourt

John Botetourt, 1st Baron Botetourt (died 1324) was an English military commander and admiral in the 13th and 14th centuries.

A genealogy in the Hailes Abbey chronicle indicates that he may have been an illegitimate son of Edward I of England, but the claim is unsubstantiated.

== Personal life ==
In 1282, he married Matilda fitz Thomas (1269/72-), daughter of Sir Thomas fitz Otes (c. 1231–1274) of Mendlesham, Suffolk, hereditary coiner of the Mint in the Tower of London and City of Canterbury and Beatrice de Beauchamp, daughter of Knt. William de Beauchamp of Elmley, Worcestershire. Beatrice was by then remarried (c. 1278) to William de Munchensy (c. 1230).

== Career ==
He was the Governor of St Briavels Castle in Gloucestershire in 1291, became the Admiral of the North between 1294 and 1297, burning Cherbourg in 1295, and was created 1st Lord Botetourt on 13 July 1305. In 1304 he received a commission under the great seal to hear and determine the causes of a violent quarrel between the mayor and burgesses of Bristol and Lord Thomas of Berkeley and his son Maurice. He was the warden of the Forest of Dean. He fought in the expeditions of King Edward I to Gascony, and Scotland during the Wars of Scottish Independence. He was summoned to parliament from 1305 to 1324. On 22 September 1306, a force led by Botetourt and Sir John de Menteith laid siege to Dunaverty Castle on the Mull of Kintyre in the apparent belief that Robert I, King of Scots had taken refuge there. In early 1307, Botetourt led a force of 20 knights and 50 esquires against Robert the Bruce in Nithsdale. A record of compensation paid to owners for the loss of horses on 12 March 1307 suggests that this force may have suffered a defeat at the hands of the Scots.

In 1312, Botetourt joined Guy de Beauchamp, 10th Earl of Warwick in carrying off Piers Gaveston from the custody of Aymer de Valence, 2nd Earl of Pembroke, and, in common with the other nobles concerned in the death of the favourite, made his peace with the king in 1313. He was appointed the Governor of Framlingham Castle in 1314. In the Spring of 1315 he was again appointed Admiral for the Northern Seas, with a fleet based in Harwich, in preparation for another offensive against Scotland. After Flanders rose in rebellion against France in the summer of 1315, six of his ships took to the North Sea to assist the French against the Flemings.

John participated in the Battle of Boroughbridge in Yorkshire on 16 March 1322, on the side of Thomas, Earl of Lancaster's rebels. He was then fined £1,000 and pardoned on 8 October 1322 for his part in the rebellion. He died on 25 November 1324, and his grandson John succeeded him as Baron Botetourt, as his son Thomas had predeceased him.

== Issue ==
John and Matilda fitz Thomas had the following known issue:

- Thomas de Botetourt d. 1322.
- Elizabeth Botetourt, married William Latimer, 3rd Baron Latimer, had issue including:
  - William Latimer, 4th Baron Latimer.
- Ada Botetourt, married Sir John de St. Philibert d.1322, had 4 issues. Then married Richard Fitz-Simon, d. 1349.

== Sources ==
- Gorski, Richard (2009). "Botetourt, John, first Lord Botetourt (d. 1324)". Oxford Dictionary of National Biography (online ed.). Oxford, UK: Oxford University Press. doi:10.1093/ref:odnb/2966. (Subscription, Wikipedia Library access or UK public library membership required.)
- This article incorporates text from a publication now in the public domain: "Bottetourt, John de". Dictionary of National Biography. London: Smith, Elder & Co. 1885–1900.
- Houbraken, Jacobus. Thoyras, Paul de Rapin. Vertue, George. (1747). The History of England, A List of Admirals of England (1224–1745). England. Kanpton. P and J.
- Prestwich, Michael (1997) [1988]. Edward I. English Monarchs (Revised Second ed.). New Haven and London: Yale University Press. ISBN 978-0-3000-7209-9. OL 704063M.
