= Robert de Herle =

Admiral of the Fleet Sir Robert de Herle
- Born: c. 1316
- Died: 1364
- Military career
- Allegiance: England
- Branch: Royal Navy
- Service years: 1338–1364
- Commands: Admiral of the Fleet; Constable of Dover Castle; Lord Warden of the Cinque Ports; Captain of Brittany
