= Buironfosse =

- Commune
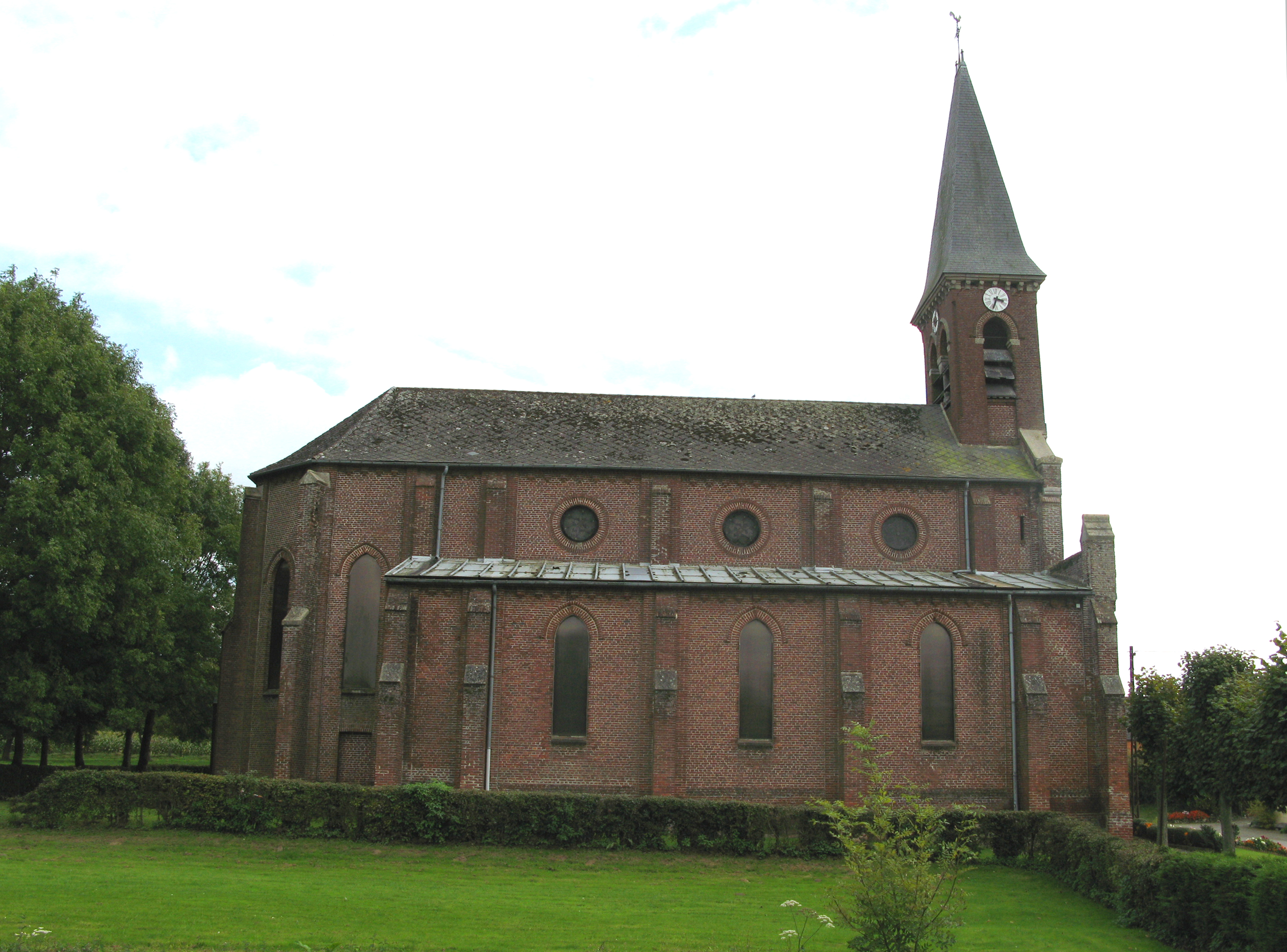
- The church of Le Boujon
- Location of Buironfosse
- Location within France Location within Hauts-de-France
- Coordinates: 49°57′58″N 3°50′07″E
- Country: France
- Region: Hauts-de-France
- Department: Aisne
- Arrondissement: Vervins
- Canton: Vervins
- Intercommunality: Thiérache du Centre

Government
  - Mayor (2026–32): Stéphane Allot
- Area^{1}: 17.6 km^{2} (6.8 sq mi)
- Elevation: 215 m (705 ft)
- Highest elevation: 222 m (728 ft)
- Lowest elevation: 173 m (568 ft)
- Population (2023): 1,122
  - Density: 63.8/km^{2} (165/sq mi)
- Time zone: UTC+01:00 (CET)
  - Summer (DST): UTC+02:00 (CEST)
- INSEE/Postal code: 02135 /02620
- ^{1} French Land Register data, which excludes lakes, ponds, glaciers > 1 km^{2} (0.386 sq mi or 247 acres) and river estuaries.

Buironfosse (French pronunciation: [bɥiʁɔ̃fɔs]) is a commune in the department of Aisne in Hauts-de-France in northern France.

== Population ==
Historical population
Year	Pop.	±% p.a.
1968	1,454	—
1975	1,341	−1.15%
1982	1,322	−0.20%
1990	1,258	−0.62%
1999	1,203	−0.50%
2007	1,210	+0.07%
2012	1,193	−0.28%
2017	1,168	−0.42%
2023	1,122	−0.67%
Source: INSEE

== Standoff of 1339 ==
In 1339 the French and English armies, engaged in the Hundred Years War, formed battle lines near Buironfosse, and then did not fight.

== See also ==
- Communes of the Aisne department
