= Lord High Admiral of the Wash =

Ancient hereditary naval office of England

The position of Lord High Admiral of the Wash is an ancient hereditary naval office of England. In medieval times, the Lord High Admiral of the Wash was a nobleman responsible for the defence and protection of The Wash coast in north East Anglia. The post was granted to the le Strange family after the Norman Conquest.

In the 16th century, the post became obsolete, and the Royal Navy assumed responsibility for the area's defence. However, the post was never formally abolished and remains a hereditary dignity with no responsibilities or privileges. The present Lord High Admiral of the Wash, Michael le Strange Meakin, lives in Hunstanton, Norfolk, and inherited the Admiralty through his mother's line.

== In popular culture ==
The Lord High Admiral of the Wash is portrayed in season 6 of The Crown, in which Prime Minister Tony Blair criticizes certain aspects of the monarchy, while Blair's rising popularity discomforts the Queen. The Lord High Admiral is depicted in The Crown as one of many "unnecessary" and redundant offices that Blair feels should be dissolved, whereas the Queen defends these offices after a review of the household positions.
