= Admiral of the South =

Former English Navy appointment

Office of the Admiral of the South
- Admiralty of the South
- Reports to: Privy Council of England
- Nominator: Monarch of England
- Appointer: Monarch of England; Subject to formal approval by the King-in-Council
- Term length: Not fixed, (usually for life)
- Inaugural holder: William de Leybourne
- Formation: 1294-1306, 1325-1326

The Admiral of the South also known as Admiral of the Southern Fleet was a senior English Navy appointment. The post holder was chiefly responsible for the command of the navy's fleet that operated in the English Channel out of Portsmouth from 1294 to 1326.

== History ==
The origins of the office Admiral of the South dates back to 1294 with the appointment of William de Leybourne. The office was known by different names from its inception, such as Admiral of the South on the Portsmouth Station (1294–-1325), Admiral of the Southern Sea, Admiral of the Southern Fleet this command existed only briefly for a period of about ten years. In 1326 the office was merged with that of the Admiral of the West. The first royal commission as Admiral to a naval officer was granted in 1303. By 1344 it was only used as a rank at sea for a captain in charge of a fleet or fleets.

Rank and Role

The administration of English Navy from the end of the 13th century was decentralized into three regional 'admiralties' until the end of the fourteenth Century. The appointment of an admiral was not regarded by the English government at the time as an honorary post subordinate to a military rank, their importance attached to their office can be confirmed by the recording of their allowances paid recorded in the Calendar of Patent Rolls. In the fourteenth Century Admirals were paid a respectable salary which was only granted because the position was viewed as substantially important. In addition the rank of admiral was only granted to men of high prestige within feudal hierarchy, most recipients of the office were usually knights but more often earls. The Admirals duties usually consisted of assembling fleets for naval expeditions undertaken by the monarch on campaign, maintaining order and discipline and supervising the work of the Admiralty Courts for each region. On major military expeditions the Admiral would go to sea with their fleets and accompany the overall Commander-in-Chief of both sea and land forces usually the King himself but sometimes a nobleman of higher rank than the admiral. Their role was to observe and direct naval battles but not necessarily taking part in them, themselves. However, from 1344 onward their role was moving from primarily administrative on to that of a seagoing command.

In 1337 the first known record of the appointment of a "vice-admiral' was granted to a Nicholas Ususmaris, a Genoese, he was made Vice-Admiral of the King's fleet of galleys, and all other ships of Aquitaine. However these appointments were few and far between. There was two further instances of the appointment of Vice-Admirals to Sir Thomas Drayton as Vice-Admiral of the Northern Fleet and Sir Peter Bard Vice-Admiral of the Western Fleet both on 28 July 1338.

Special assistants were appointed to handle two important sub-divisions of the admirals powers. The first was the admiral's lieutenant, or deputy, referred to as sub-admirals, who handled administrative and legal duties and each of these admirals had one and often retained more knowledge than the Admiral himself in relation to the sea and coastal communities. It would not be until the early 15th century that they would appointed on a more regular basis however they were referred to at this time as the admirals Lieutenant-General this office eventually became known as the Lieutenant of the Admiralty.

The second was the Wardens of the Coast for each region who were responsible for the direction and co-ordination of the fleet, the equipping of boats and processing payments to sailors and superintendence of the Sea Guard Militia assigned to each maritime coastal county. From the mid fourteenth century there was a move to centralise these regional naval authorities as seen with the appointment of the Admiral of the Southern, Northern and Western fleets sometimes referred to as Admiral of the Fleet or Admiral of England and the Admiral of the North and West this tendency towards unifying regional naval authorities under one admiral eventually led to the creation of the office of the Lord-Admiral of England

The Admirals were logistically supported by the Clerk of the King's Ships who looked after all the navy's finances whilst victualling of the navy was handled by another one of King's Clerks.

== Admirals of the South ==
Includes:

- Admiral Sir William de Leybourne, 1294 – 1310

No appointments 1311 – 1325

- Admiral Sir Nicholas de Crioll, 1325-1326

No appointments after 1326 the office is merged with the office of Admiral of the West

== See also ==
- Admiral of the Narrow Seas
- Admiral of the North
- Admiral of the North and West
- Admiral of the North and South
- Admiral of all the Fleets
- Admiral of the West
