= Admiral of the West =

Former English Navy appointment

Office of the Admiral of the West
- Admiralty of the West
- Reports to: Privy Council of England, Lord High Admiral of England
- Nominator: Monarch of England
- Appointer: Monarch of England; Subject to formal approval by the King-in-Council
- Term length: Not fixed (usually for life)
- Inaugural holder: Sir William de Leybourne, Baron de Leybourne
- Formation: 1294
- Abolished: 1412
- Superseded by: High Admiral of England, Ireland and Aquitaine

The Admiral of the West, also known as Admiral of the Western Seas or Admiral of the Western Fleet, was formerly an English Navy appointment. The postholder was chiefly responsible for the command of the English navy's fleet based at Portsmouth, which operated in the English Channel, Irish Sea and Atlantic Ocean, from 1294 to 1412.

== History ==
The origin of the office of Admiral of the West dates back to 1294, with the appointment of Sir William, Baron de Leybourne, originally styled Admiral of the West and Irish Sea. He also jointly held the title of Admiral of the South until 1306, when that post was left vacant; it resumed very briefly in 1325. In 1326, the post of Admiral of the South and its command duties were merged with that of Admiral of the West. The office was styled by different names from its establishment, such as Admiral of the West and Irish Sea and Admiral on the Western Station (1294–1306), Admiral of the Western Squadron and Admiral West, of the mouth of the Thames (1306–1406). With the exception of the periods for the creation of the offices of the Admiral of the North and West from 18 July 1360 to 16 January 1361, and the office of Admiral of all the Fleets about England from 16 January 1361 to 28 April 1362, no further official appointments were made. The office resumed again until the creation of the office of the Admiral of England from April 1385 to 18 March 1388, when once more appointments ceased. The post was revived in 1388, and lasted until the creation of the office of Admiral of England, Ireland and Aquitaine some time between 1406 and 1412. The first royal commission as Admiral to a naval officer was granted in 1303. By 1344 it was only used as a rank at sea for a captain in charge of a fleet or fleets.

This command, along with that of Admiral of the North, was regarded as one of the most senior posts in the English navy from the end of the 13th century until the beginning of the 15th century.

Rank and Role

The administration of English Navy from the end of the 13th century was decentralized into three regional 'admiralties' until the end of the fourteenth Century. The appointment of an admiral was not regarded by the English government at the time as an honorary post subordinate to a military rank, their importance attached to their office can be confirmed by the recording of their allowances paid recorded in the Calendar of Patent Rolls. In the fourteenth Century Admirals were paid a respectable salary which was only granted because the position was viewed as substantially important. In addition the rank of admiral was only granted to men of high prestige within feudal hierarchy, most recipients of the office were usually knights but more often earls. The Admirals duties usually consisted of assembling fleets for naval expeditions undertaken by the monarch on campaign, maintaining order and discipline and supervising the work of the Admiralty Courts for each region. On major military expeditions the Admiral would go to sea with their fleets and accompany the overall Commander-in-Chief of both sea and land forces usually the King himself but sometimes a nobleman of higher rank than the admiral. Their role was to observe and direct naval battles but not necessarily taking part in them, themselves. However, from 1344 onward their role was moving from primarily administrative one to that of a seagoing command.

In 1337 the first known record of the appointment of a "vice-admiral' was granted to a Nicholas Ususmaris, a Genoese, he was made Vice-Admiral of the King's fleet of galleys, and all other ships of Aquitaine. However these appointments were few and far between. There was two further instances of the appointment of Vice-Admirals to Sir Thomas Drayton as Vice-Admiral of the Northern Fleet and Sir Peter Bard Vice-Admiral of the Western Fleet both on 28 July 1338.

Special assistants were appointed to handle two important sub-divisions of the admirals powers. The first was the admiral's lieutenant, or deputy, referred to as sub-admirals, who handled administrative and legal duties and each of these admirals had one and often retained more knowledge than the Admiral himself in relation to the sea and coastal communities. It would not be until the early 15th century that they would appointed on a more regular basis however they were referred to at this time as the admirals Lieutenant-General this office eventually became known as the Lieutenant of the Admiralty.

The second was the Wardens of the Coast for each region who were responsible for the direction and co-ordination of the fleet, the equipping of boats and processing payments to sailors and superintendence of the Sea Guard Militia assigned to each maritime coastal county. From the mid fourteenth century there was a move to centralise these regional naval authorities as seen with the appointment of the Admiral of the Southern, Northern and Western fleets sometimes referred to as Admiral of the Fleet or Admiral of England and the Admiral of the North and West this tendency towards unifying regional naval authorities under one admiral eventually led to the creation of the office of the Lord-Admiral of England

The Admirals were logistically supported by the Clerk of the King's Ships who looked after all the navy's finances whilst victualling of the navy was handled by another one of King's Clerks.

== Admirals of the West ==
Includes:

Admiral of the West and Irish Sea

- Admiral Sir William de Leybourne, 1294 - 1306

Admiral of the West

- Admiral Gervase Alard, 1306 - 1314
- Admiral William Cranis, 1314 - 1316
- Admirals Sir Robert Leyburn & Nicholas Crioill, 1316 - 1318 (jointly)
- Admiral John Athey, 1318 - 1322
- Admiral Sir Robert de Leyburn, 1322 - 1323
- Admiral Robert Battail (alias Battall), 1323 - 1324
- Admiral Robert Bendon, 1324 - 1325
- Admiral Sir John de Felton, 1325
- Admiral Nicholas Crioill, 1325 - 1327

Note: In 1326, the office of Admiral of the Southern Fleet was amalgamated with this command.

- Admiral Wares de Valoines, 1327 - 16 July 1327
- Admiral William de Clinton, 1st Earl of Huntingdon, 16 July 1327 – 2 January 1334
- Admiral William de Mantes, 2 January 1334 – 11 August 1337
- Admiral Bartholomew de Burghersh, 1st Baron Burghersh, 11 August 1337 – 22 July 1338
- Admiral Peter Dardus (alias Bard), 22 July 1338 – 18 February 1339
- Admirals Robert Truffel & Richard FitzAlan, 10th Earl of Arundel, 18 February 1339 – 12 January 1341 (jointly)
- Admiral William de Clinton, 1st Earl of Huntingdon, 12 January 1341 – 20 December 1342
- Admiral Robert Beaupell, 20 December 1342 – 1343
- Admiral Sir John de Montgomery, 1343 - 8 May 1344
- Admiral Sir Reginald de Cobham, 1st Baron Cobham, 8 May 1344 – 23 February 1345
- Admiral Richard FitzAlan, 10th Earl of Arundel, 23 February 1345 – 23 February 1347
- Admiral Sir John de Montgomery, 23 February 1347 – 14 March 1348
- Admiral Sir Reginald de Cobham, 1st Baron Cobham, 14 February 1348 – 1350
- Admiral Sir John de Beauchamp, 1350 – 8 March 1352
- Admiral Henry, Duke of Lancaster, 8 March 1352 – 1354
- Admiral Sir Thomas de Beauchamp, 12th Earl of Warwick, 1354 - 5 March 1355
- Admiral Sir John de Beauchamp, 1st Baron Beauchamp de Warwick, 5 March 1355 – 1 March 1356 (brother of Earl of Warwick)
- Admiral Sir Guy de Bryan, 1st Baron Bryan, 1 March 1356 – 18 July 1360

No appointments: see Admiral of all the Fleets, 16 January 1361 – 28 April 1362
No Appointments: see Admiral of the North and West, 17 July 1364 - 28 April 1369

- Admiral Sir Robert de Ashton, 28 April 1362 – 3 May 1370
- Admiral Sir Guy de Bryan, 1st Baron Bryan, 3 May 1370 - 6 October 1372
- Admiral Sir Philip Courtenay, 7 October 1372 – 16 July 1376 (the King's cousin)
- Admiral William Montacute, 2nd Earl of Salisbury, 16 July 1376 – 24 November 1376
- Admiral Robert Hales, 24 November 1376 – 24 November 1377 (prior of Saint John of Jerusalem in England)

No appointments: see Admiral of the North and West, 24 November 1377 - 5 December 1377

- Admiral Richard FitzAlan, 10th Earl of Arundel, 5 December 1377 – 1 September 1378
- Admiral Sir Hugh Calveley, 1 September 1378 – 8 March 1380
- Admiral Sir Philip Courtenay, 8 March 1380 – 1381
- Admiral Walter de Hauley, 1381 – 23 May 1381
- Admiral Sir John Roches, 23 May 1381 – 10 November 1383
- Admiral Edward de Courtenay, Earl of Devon, 10 November 1383 – 29 January 1384
- Admiral John Radington, 29 January 1384 – 22 February 1385 (prior of Saint John of Jerusalem in England)
- Admiral Sir Thomas Trivett, 22 February 1385 – April 1385

No appointments: see Lord High Admiral of the United KingdomAdmiral of England, April 1385 – 18 March 1388

- Admiral John Holand, Earl of Huntingdon, 18 March 1388 – 29 January 1391

No appointments: see Admiral of the North and West, 29 January 1391 – 21 April 1400

- Admiral Sir Thomas Reniston, 21 April 1400 – 5 November 1403
- Admiral Thomas de Berkeley, 5th Baron Berkeley,5 November 1403 – 20 February 1404
- See Admiral of the North and South, 20 February 1404 – 28 April 1405
- Admiral Richard Clitherow, 28 April 1405 – 23 December 1406 (appointment is recorded as admiral of the western and southern fleets)

Note: The office, although vacant, was amalgamated within a single office of Lord High Admiral of England in 1412.

== See also ==
- Admiral of all the Fleets
- Admiral of the Narrow Seas
- Admiral of the North
- Admiral of the North and West
- Admiral of the North and South
- Admiral of the South
