= Admiral of the North =

Former English Navy appointment

Office of the Admiral of the North
- Admiralty of the North
- Reports to: Privy Council of England
- Nominator: Monarch of England
- Appointer: Monarch of England; Subject to formal approval by the King-in-Council
- Term length: Not fixed, usually for life
- Inaugural holder: John de Botetourt, 1st Baron Botetourt
- Formation: 1294
- Abolished: 1412
- Superseded by: High Admiral of England, Ireland and Aquitaine

The Admiral of the North also known as Admiral of the Northern Seas and Admiral of the Northern Fleet was a senior English Navy appointment. The Admiral was chiefly responsible for the command of the navy's fleet that operated in the North Sea and off the English coast out of Yarmouth from 1294 to 1412.

== History ==
The origins of the office of Admiral of the North date back to 1294 with the appointment of John de Botetourt. The office was known by different names from its inception, such as Admiral of the North and Admiral on the Yarmouth Station (1294–1325), Admiral of the North Sea, Admiral of the Northern Squadron and Admiral North, of the Thames with the exception of the office of Admiral of all the Fleets about England between 1360 and 1364 and the creation of the office of Admiral of England from 1385 to 1388 according to Ehrman "During the fourteenth centuries this office grew rapidly in importance" it was one of the two Admiralties that existed at this time, and in 1412 this office along with the Admiralty of the West was amalgamated into a single office Admiral of England, Ireland and Aquitaine. It was considered the most important naval command in the English Navy from the late 13th century until the beginning of the 15th century.

The first royal commission as Admiral to a naval officer was granted in 1303. By 1344 it was only used as a rank at sea for a captain in charge of a fleet or fleets.

Rank and Role

The administration of the English Navy from the end of the 13th century was decentralized into three regional 'admiralties' until the end of the fourteenth Century. The appointment of an admiral was not regarded by the English government at the time as an honorary post subordinate to a military rank, their importance attached to their office can be confirmed by the recording of their allowances paid recorded in the Calendar of Patent Rolls. In the fourteenth Century Admirals were paid a respectable salary which was only granted because the position was viewed as substantially important. In addition the rank of admiral was only granted to men of high prestige within feudal hierarchy, most recipients of the office were usually knights but more often earls. The Admirals duties usually consisted of assembling fleets for naval expeditions undertaken by the monarch on campaign, maintaining order and discipline and supervising the work of the Admiralty Courts for each region. On major military expeditions the Admiral would go to sea with their fleets and accompany the overall Commander-in-Chief of both sea and land forces usually the King himself but sometimes a nobleman of higher rank than the admiral. Their role was to observe and direct naval battles but not necessarily taking part in them, themselves. However, from 1344 onward their role was moving from primarily an administrative one to that of a seagoing command.

In 1337 the first known record of the appointment of a "vice-admiral' was granted to a Nicholas Ususmaris, a Genoese, he was made Vice-Admiral of the King's fleet of galleys, and all other ships of Aquitaine. However these appointments were few and far between. There was two further instances of the appointment of Vice-Admirals to Sir Thomas Drayton as Vice-Admiral of the Northern Fleet and Sir Peter Bard Vice-Admiral of the Western Fleet both on 28 July 1338.

Special assistants were appointed to handle two important sub-divisions of the admirals powers. The first was the admiral's lieutenant, or deputy sometimes referred to as sub-admirals, who handled administrative and legal duties and each of these admirals had one and often retained more knowledge than the Admiral himself in relation to the sea and coastal communities. It would not be until the early 15th century that they would appointed on a more regular basis however they were referred to at this time as the admirals Lieutenant-General this office eventually became known as the Lieutenant of the Admiralty.

The second was the Wardens of the Coast for each region who were responsible for the direction and co-ordination of the fleet, the equipping of boats and processing payments to sailors and superintendence of the Sea Guard Militia assigned to each maritime coastal county. From the mid fourteenth century there was a move to centralise these regional naval authorities as seen with the appointment of the Admiral of the Southern, Northern and Western fleets sometimes referred to as Admiral of the Fleet or Admiral of England and the Admiral of the North and West this tendency towards unifying regional naval authorities under one admiral eventually led to the creation of the office of the Lord-Admiral of England

The Admirals were logistically supported by the Clerk of the King's Ships who looked after all the navy's finances whilst victualling of the navy was handled by another one of King's Clerks.

== Office Holders ==
Notes:The British Naval Historian Nicholas A. M. Rodger in his book the Safeguard of the Sea (2004) lists only officers that were appointed to this office and also took part in particular campaigns and not those that were officially appointed Admiral of the North, but their appointments were cancelled at the start of a campaign.

Included:

- Admiral Sir John de Botetourt, 1st Baron Botetourt, (1295 – 1296).
- Admiral Sir Edward Charles, (1306 – 1307).
- Admiral Sir John Sturmy and Sir Peter Bard, (1314 – 1315). (joint).
- Admiral Sir John de Botetourt, 1st Baron Botetourt, (1315 - 1316).

No appointments 1315 – 1322

- Admiral Sir John Perbroun, (1322 – 1324).
- Admiral Sir John Sturmy, (1324 – 1325).
- Admiral Sir John Ottervin, (1325 *).
- Admiral Sir John Sturmy, 1325 – 1326
- Admiral Sir Robert Layborn, (1326 – 1327).
- Admiral Sir John Perbroun, (1327 – 1328).

No appointments 1329 – 1333

- Admiral Sir John Perbroun and Admiral Henry Randolf, (1334 – 1335), (joint).
- Admiral Sir John Howard, (1335 -1335).
- Admiral Sir John Norwich, Lord Norwich, (1335 - 1337).
- Admirals John, Lord Ross and Sir Robert Ufford, 1st Earl of Suffolk and Sir Walter Manny, 1st Baron Manny, (1337 - 1338), (jointly).
- Admiral Sir Thomas Drayton, (1338 - 1339).
- Admiral Sir Robert Morley, 2nd Baron Morley, (1339 - 1343).
- Admiral Sir William Trussell, (1343 - 1344).
- Admiral Sir Robert Ufford, 1st Earl of Suffolk, (1344 -1345).
- Admiral Sir John Howard, (1345 -1347).
- Admirals Sir Robert Morley, 2nd Baron Morley and Sir Walter Manny, 1st Baron Manny, (1348 -1349), (jointly).
- Admiral Sir Robert Morley, 2nd Baron Morley, (1350 -1351).
- Admiral William Bohun, 1st Earl of Northampton, (1351 -1352).

No appointments 1353 – 1354

- Admiral Sir Robert Morley, 2nd Baron Morley, (1355 -1356).

No appointments 1357 – 1369 see Admiral of the South, North and West.

- Admiral Sir Nicholas Tamsworth, (1369 -1370).
- Admiral John, Lord Neville, (1370 -1371).
- Admiral Sir Ralph Ferrers, (1371 -1372).
- Admiral Sir William Neville, (1372 -1373).

No appointments 1374 – 1375.

- Admiral William Ufford, 2nd Earl of Suffolk, (1376 -1377).
- Admiral Sir Michael de la Pole. (1377 - 1378).
- Admiral Thomas Beauchamp, 4th Earl of Warwick, (1378 -1379).
- Admiral Sir Thomas Percy, (1379 - 1380).
- Admiral Sir William Elmham, (1380 -1381).
- Admiral Walter, Lord FitzWalter, (1382 -1383).
- Admiral Henry Percy, 1st Earl of Northumberland. (1384 -1385).
- Admiral Sir Thomas Percy, 1st Earl of Worcester, (1385 - 1386).
- Admiral Philip, Lord Darcy, (1386 -1387).

No appointments 1388 – 1389 see Admiral of the North and West.

- Admiral Sir John Beaumont, KG, 4th Baron Beaumont, (1389 -1390).
- Admiral Edward of York, Earl of Rutland. (1390 -1391).

No appointments 1392 – 1400 see Admiral of the North and West.

- Admiral Richard, Lord Grey, 4th Baron Grey of Codnor, (1401 -1402).
- Admiral Thomas Beaufort, 1st Duke of Exeter, (1403 – 1404), (brother to the Marquess of Dorset).

No appointments: see Admiral of the North and West, 20 February 1404 – 28 April 1405.

- Admiral Sir Nicholas Blackburn, (1406 – 1407).

Note: The office although vacant was amalgamated into the single office of the Lord Admiral of England in 1412.

== See also ==
- Admiral of all the Fleets
- Admiral of the West
- Admiral of the South
- Admiral of the Narrow Seas
- Admiral of the North and West
- Admiral of the North and South
