= Lord High Admiral of the United Kingdom =

Titular head of the Royal Navy

- Flag of the Lord High Admiral

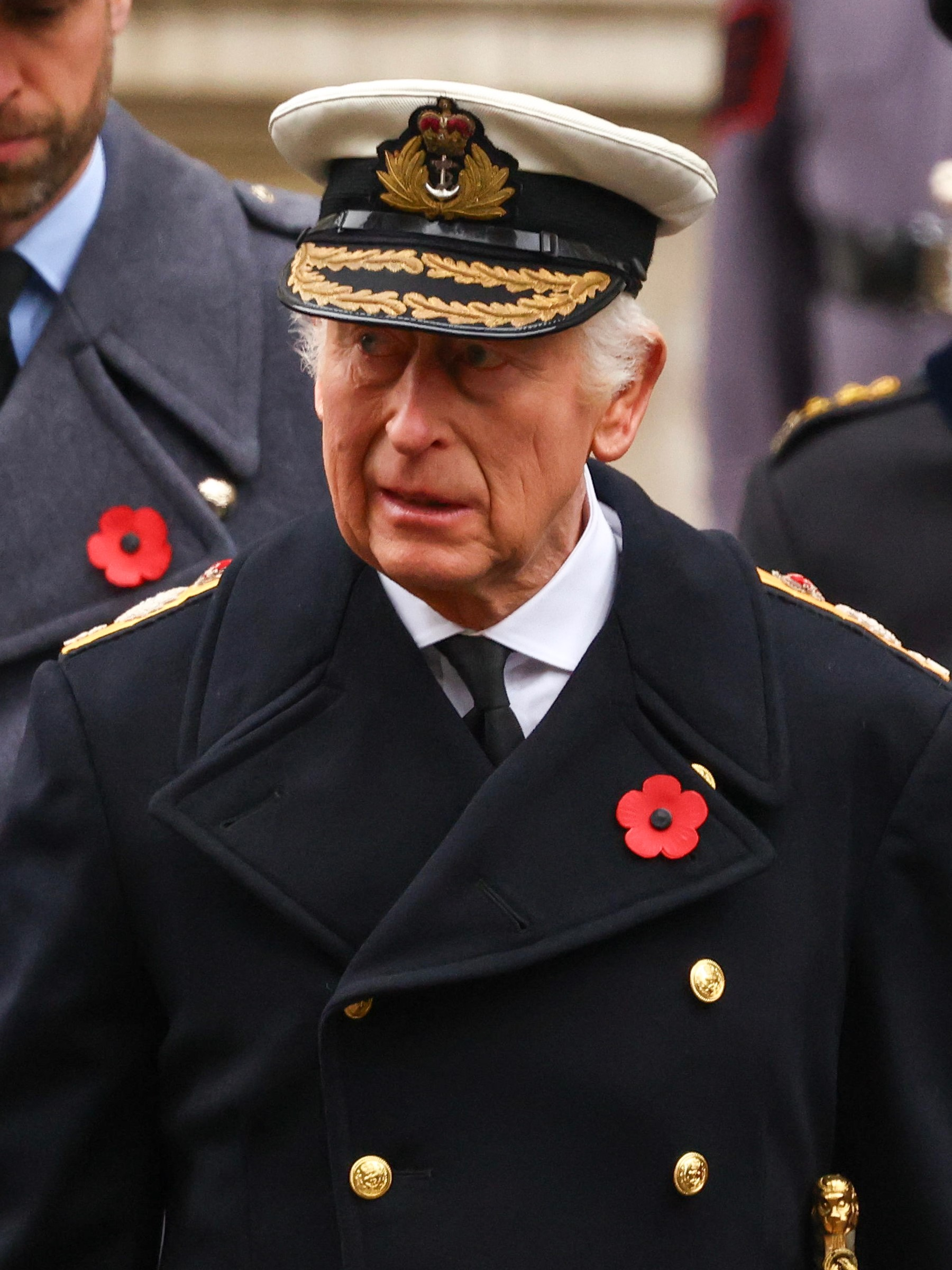
- Incumbent; King Charles III since 2022
- Type: Great Officer of State
- Appointer: The Monarch
- Precursor: Lord High Admiral of England; Lord High Admiral of Scotland
- Formation: 1800 (United Kingdom); 1707 (Great Britain); 1385 (England)
- First holder: The 4th Earl of Arundel (as High Admiral of England, Ireland and Aquitaine)
- Deputy: Vice-Admiral of the United Kingdom

Lord High Admiral of the United Kingdom (of England beginning in the 14th century, later of Great Britain from 1707 to 1800) is the title of the ceremonial head of the Royal Navy. Most have been courtiers or members of the British royal family, and not professional naval officers. The Lord High Admiral is one of the nine English Great Officers of State and since 2021 is held personally by the reigning monarch (currently King Charles III, who is also Commander-in-Chief of the Armed Forces).

== History ==
In 1385 Richard Fitzalan, 4th Earl of Arundel, was appointed Admiral of England, reuniting the offices of Admiral of the North and Admiral of the West, separate from 1294. From 1388 the offices of Admiral of the North and of the West were again distinct, though often held by the same man, until "Admirals of England" were appointed continuously from 1406. The titles "High Admiral" and "Lord Admiral" were both used, eventually combining in "Lord High Admiral". The Lord High Admiral did not originally have command at sea, but had jurisdiction over maritime affairs and the authority to establish courts of Admiralty.

During the reign of Henry VIII (1509–47) the English Navy had expanded to a point where it could not be managed by a single Lord High Admiral alone, therefore day-to-day management of the navy was handed over to a committee that later became known as the Navy Board. The navy board had Samuel Pepys as one of its members during the reign of Charles II (1660–85), and it ran side-by-side with the Board of Admiralty.

From the early 17th century onwards, when an individual Lord High Admiral was appointed, there was also a Council of the Lord High Admiral which assisted him to perform some of the duties of the Admiralty. When this office was not occupied by an individual, it was "put into commission" and exercised by a Board of Admiralty headed by a First Lord of the Admiralty; this was the usual arrangement from 1709 until it was merged with the Admiralty in 1832.

However, the office of Lord High Admiral, which—except for brief periods during its long history—had remained extant, was not abolished as an official naval post until 1964. In 1964, the office of First Lord of the Admiralty was also abolished and the functions of the Lords Commissioners of Admiralty were transferred to the new Admiralty Board becoming a sub-committee (Navy) of the tri-service Defence Council of the United Kingdom. The ancient title, however, of Lord High Admiral was resumed—by the sovereign personally.

Elizabeth II held the title for the next 47 years until, in 2011, she conferred the office upon her husband, Prince Philip, Duke of Edinburgh, to celebrate his 90th birthday. Philip had served in the Royal Navy during the Second World War, but he gave up a promising naval career to support Elizabeth as her consort.

=== Current status ===
Upon Prince Philip's death in 2021, the identity of the holder of the office became obscure, i.e., there has been no official announcement about the office's holder since then. It is unknown whether the office of Lord High Admiral reverted to the Crown, or if it is currently vacant, in which case it remains as such until His Majesty either assumes it, or bestows it upon someone else. The Ministry of Defence confirmed they did not hold information on the issue, but suggested it had been resumed by Queen Elizabeth II in right of the Crown. Upon Queen Elizabeth II's death in 2022, the office was reported to have been passed to King Charles III. The office is understood to be held by the monarch (currently King Charles III) by default and can be granted to whoever is chosen by the monarch.

== List of high admirals ==
=== England and Ireland, 1385–1512 ===
High Admiral	Term of office	
Richard FitzAlan, 4th Earl of Arundel	1385	1388
Edward, Earl of Rutland	1390	1397
John Beaufort, 1st Earl of Somerset	1397	1398
Thomas Percy, 1st Earl of Worcester	1398	1400
Thomas of Lancaster, Duke of Clarence	1404	1405
John Beaufort, 1st Earl of Somerset	1406	1407
Edmund Holland, 4th Earl of Kent	1407	1408
Thomas Beaufort, Duke of Exeter	1408	1426
John of Lancaster, Duke of Bedford	1426	1435
John Holland, 2nd Duke of Exeter	1435	1447
William de la Pole, 1st Duke of Suffolk	1447	1450
Henry Holland, 3rd Duke of Exeter	1450	1460
Richard Neville, 16th Earl of Warwick	1461	1462
William Neville, 1st Earl of Kent	1462	1462
Richard, Duke of Gloucester	1462	1470
Richard Neville, 16th Earl of Warwick	1470	1471
Richard, Duke of Gloucester	1471	1483
John Howard, 1st Duke of Norfolk	1483	1485
John de Vere, 13th Earl of Oxford	1485	1512

=== England, 1512–1638 ===
Lord Admiral	Term of office	
Sir Edward Howard	1512	1513
Thomas Howard, Earl of Surrey	1513	1525
Henry FitzRoy, Duke of Richmond and Somerset	1525	1536
William Fitzwilliam, 1st Earl of Southampton	1536	1540
John Russell, Lord Russell	1540	1542
John Dudley, Viscount Lisle	1542	1546
Thomas Seymour, 1st Baron Seymour of Sudeley	1546	1549
John Dudley Earl of Warwick	1549	1550
Edward Clinton, Lord Clinton	1550	1554
William Howard, 1st Baron Howard of Effingham	1554	1558
Edward Clinton, 1st Earl of Lincoln	1558	1585
Charles Howard, 2nd Baron Howard of Effingham; Earl of Nottingham from 1597	1585	1619
George Villiers, 1st Duke of Buckingham	1619	1628

== List of lords high admirals ==
=== England, 1638–1707 ===
Lord High Admiral	Term of office		Monarch (Reign)
Algernon Percy, 10th Earl of Northumberland	1638	1642	
Francis Cottington, 1st Baron Cottington	1643	1646	
Prince James, Duke of York and Albany	6 June 1660	14 June 1673	Charles II r. 1660–1685
King Charles II	14 June 1673	9 July 1673	Charles II r. 1660–1685
Prince Rupert, Duke of Cumberland	9 July 1673	14 May 1679	Charles II r. 1660–1685
Office in commission	14 May 1679	19 May 1684	Charles II r. 1660–1685
King Charles II	19 May 1684	6 February 1685	Charles II r. 1660–1685
King James II	6 February 1685	23 December 1688	James II r. 1685–1688
King William III	13 February 1689	8 March 1689	Mary II r. 1689–1694 & William III r. 1689–1702
Office in commission	8 March 1689	26 January 1702	Mary II r. 1689–1694 & William III r. 1689–1702
Thomas Herbert, 8th Earl of Pembroke	26 January 1702	8 March 1702	Mary II r. 1689–1694 & William III r. 1689–1702
Thomas Herbert, 8th Earl of Pembroke	8 March 1702	20 May 1702	Anne r. 1702–1714
Prince George, Duke of Cumberland	20 May 1702	1 May 1707	Anne r. 1702–1714

=== Great Britain, 1707–1800 ===
Before 1707 there was an office of Lord High Admiral of Scotland. Following the Act of Union 1707, all jurisdictions were placed under the office of Lord High Admiral of Great Britain.

Lord High Admiral	Term of office		Monarch (Reign)
Prince George, Duke of Cumberland	1 May 1707	23 October 1708	Anne r. 1702–1714
Queen Anne	23 October 1708	27 November 1708	Anne r. 1702–1714
Thomas Herbert, 8th Earl of Pembroke	27 November 1708	8 November 1709	Anne r. 1702–1714
Office in commission	8 November 1709	1 August 1714	Anne r. 1702–1714
Office in commission	1 August 1714	11 June 1727	George I r. 1714–1727
Office in commission	11 June 1727	25 October 1760	George II r. 1727–1760
Office in commission	25 October 1760	31 December 1800	George III (1760–1820)

=== United Kingdom, 1801–present ===
Lord High Admiral	Term of office		Monarch (Reign)
Office in commission	1 January 1801	29 January 1820	George III (1760–1820) (Note: The Prince of Wales served as prince regent from 5 February 1811.)
Office in commission	29 January 1820	10 May 1827	George IV r. 1820–1830
Prince William, Duke of Clarence and St Andrews	10 May 1827	19 September 1828	George IV r. 1820–1830
Office in commission	19 September 1828	26 June 1830	George IV r. 1820–1830
Office in commission	26 June 1830	20 June 1837	William IV r. 1830–1837
Office in commission	20 June 1837	22 January 1901	Victoria r. 1837–1901
Office in commission	22 January 1901	6 May 1910	Edward VII r. 1901–1910
Office in commission	6 May 1910	20 January 1936	George V r. 1910–1936
Office in commission	20 January 1936	11 December 1936	Edward VIII r. 1936
Office in commission	11 December 1936	6 February 1952	George VI r. 1936–1952
Office in commission	6 February 1952	1 April 1964	Elizabeth II r. 1952–2022
Queen Elizabeth II	1 April 1964	10 June 2011	Elizabeth II r. 1952–2022
Prince Philip, Duke of Edinburgh	10 June 2011	9 April 2021	Elizabeth II r. 1952–2022
Queen Elizabeth II	9 April 2021	8 September 2022	Elizabeth II r. 1952–2022
King Charles III	8 September 2022	present	Charles III (2022–present)

== Former command flags ==
=== Tudor period ===
First command Flag of the Lord Admiral of England (1554–1558) under Mary I and Philip II when on board a ship.

First command Flag of the Lord Admiral of England under Henry VIII, Edward VI and Elizabeth I (1545–1553, 1559–1603) when on board a ship.

First command Flag of the Lord Admiral of England (1603–1625) under James VI and I when on board a ship.

Second command Flag of the Lord Admiral of England (1545–1625) when on board a ship.

The earliest known instructions given to the Lord Admiral to fly command flags were given by King Henry VIII in 1545. The Lord Admiral was ordered to fly the flag of the arms of the King on the top of the main masthead, with the flag of the cross of Saint George on the top of the front (fore) masthead.

== See also ==
- Lord High Admiral of Scotland
- Lord High Admiral of the Wash
- Lord High Admiral of Sweden
- First Lord of the Admiralty

== Sources ==
- Houbraken, Jacobus. Thoyras, Paul de Rapin. Vertue, George. (1747). The History of England, A List of Admirals of England (1224-1745). England. Kanpton. P and J.
- Reference
