= History of the Royal Navy (before 1707) =

Properly speaking, the history of the Royal Navy began in 1546 with the establishment of the "Navy Royal" by Henry VIII. This became the Parliamentary Navy during the period of the Commonwealth with the modern incarnation of Royal Navy established in 1660 following the Restoration of King Charles II to the throne. The English navy began operating together with the much smaller Royal Scots Navy at the time of the Union of the Crowns under James I in 1603 but only formally merged in 1707 at the establishment of the united Kingdom of Great Britain.

The history of the English navy can be traced back much further, however. Ad hoc levies of ships allowed seaborne invasions by at least the 7th century and naval battles occurred against invading Vikings in the 9th. Following the 11th-century Norman Conquest, naval expenses were initially avoided but the 1204 loss of Normandy made control of the Channel much more essential. Early fleets were borrowed from the kingdom's merchants and fishers, particularly at the Cinque Ports, assembled as needed and then dispersed. King John began maintaining a number of large ships in the king's own name and the Cinque Port wardens developed into admirals, permanent officers ready to levy and command fleets and provided legal jurisdiction over England's seas and coasts. A full standing navy took shape during the 16th century and finally became a regular establishment during the tumults of the 17th.

== Early medieval England ==
=== Early English kingdoms (to 927) ===
Some evidence of English ship construction in the Anglo-Saxon period is available from the boat burials at Snape (about 550) and Sutton Hoo (about 625), though warships would probably have been larger than the vessels interred there. There is little evidence of the naval activities of the English kingdoms before the mid-9th century, but King Edwin of Northumbria (616/7–633/4) conquered the Isle of Man and Anglesey, and another King of Northumbria, Ecgfrith, sent a military expedition to Gaelic Ireland in 684.

The threat from Vikings increased significantly in the early 9th century, and invasions became a serious menace from about 835. In 851 an unprecedentedly large force of Danes invaded southern England, carried on about 350 ships. Campaigning inland, this force was decisively defeated by King Æthelwulf of Wessex at the Battle of Aclea, but a naval action was also won by Æthelwulf's son Æthelstan and Ealdorman Ealhere at Sandwich, Kent, capturing nine ships.

The Danish Great Army, which conquered about half of England during its campaigns in 865–879, operated largely by land and no naval operations against it by the English kingdoms are recorded. However, in the following years a number of clashes are recorded between Viking raiders and the forces of Alfred the Great, the last remaining English king. These included a victory over four ships by a squadron led by the king himself in 882, and operations against the Danes of East Anglia in 884, which saw an entire Danish squadron of sixteen ships captured by an English force, which was then itself defeated on its way home by another fleet. In 896 Alfred had a number of new ships built to his own design, "nearly twice as long as the others, some having 60 oars, some even more", to counter raids along the south coast. A clash in the Solent later that year saw nine of his new ships defeat six Danish ships.

=== United England (927–1066) ===
Naval operations are glimpsed again in 934, when King Æthelstan, now ruler of all England, invaded Scotland with a combined sea and land force. Under King Edgar (959–975) the kings of Scotland, of Cumbria and of four other kingdoms would regularly swear to be King Edgar's faithful allies by land and sea.

The renewal of serious Viking attacks in the reign of Æthelred the Unready led to a general muster of ships at London in 992 against the fleet of Olaf Tryggvason, but amid confusion and alleged treachery the English fleet suffered heavy losses. In 1008, Æthelred ordered a new programme of naval construction, under which one warship was to be provided for every 310 hides of land in the kingdom. In 1009 the king took the new fleet out to Sandwich, Kent to guard against the threat of invasion (this port, near the junction of the North Sea and the English Channel and lying within the sheltered offshore anchorage of the Downs, appears frequently in the sources for this period as a position where fleets were stationed on guard). However, this deployment ended in disaster due to internal dissension. Accusations against the great Sussex thegn Wulfnoth (probably the father of Godwin, later Earl of Wessex) led to his flight from the fleet with 20 ships manned by his supporters. A force of 80 ships sent after him was wrecked by a storm and the beached ships burnt by Wulfnoth, after which the remainder of the fleet dispersed in confusion.

English naval forces were supplemented by Scandinavian mercenaries. Directly after the fiasco of 1009 a new invasion force led by the Danish warlord Thorkell the Tall began a devastating campaign in England. When the attackers were finally bought off and dispersed in 1012, Thorkell entered Æthelred's service with 45 ships. When the King of Denmark Swein Forkbeard conquered England in 1013, the fleet remained loyal to Æthelred after the rest of the kingdom had submitted to the invader. Swein's death in 1014 led to Æthelred's brief return to power, but in 1015–16 England was again conquered by Swein's son Cnut, whose invasion force had been joined by 40 ship-loads of Danish mercenaries who defected from Æthelred's service. Having secured the throne, Cnut dismissed the bulk of his fleet, but maintained a standing force of 40 ships, funded by national taxation. In 1025 Cnut led an Anglo-Danish fleet to campaign against his enemies in Scandinavia, and in 1028 he conquered Norway with a force including 50 English ships. The standing fleet was in time reduced to 16 ships, but increased again after Cnut's son Harthacnut brought a fleet from Denmark to claim the throne in 1040.

The early years of Edward the Confessor's reign saw a series of large naval operations under the king's own command, including in 1045 the deployment at Sandwich of a particularly big fleet to guard against an expected invasion from Norway, and a blockade of Flanders in 1049, in support of a land campaign by the German Emperor Henry III. In 1050 Edward reduced the standing force, then numbering 14 ships, to five. After a political crisis in 1051 saw Earl Godwin and his sons driven into exile, Edward sent out a force of 40 ships to Sandwich to guard against their return. However Godwin, returning with ships from Flanders, eluded them, and he and his son Harold, coming from Ireland, gathered a powerful fleet from the butsecarles ("boatmen") of the Earldom of Wessex. With this fleet and an army also gathered from Wessex, Godwin came to London and confronted the king, who was supported by an army and a fleet of 50 ships. The crisis ended with the negotiated reinstatement of Godwin and his sons to their former possessions and power.

In 1063 Earl Harold Godwinson led a fleet to Wales against Gruffydd ap Llywelyn of Gwynedd, while his brother Tostig invaded by land. Harold put Gruffydd to flight and destroyed his fleet and his residence at Rhuddlan, defeats which led to Gruffydd's murder by his own people in order to end the war. King Edward installed Gruffydd's half-brothers in his place, and they swore to serve him "on water and on land", suggesting that England's native naval forces could be supplemented by tributary contingents from neighbouring dependent territories as well as by foreign mercenaries.

In 1066, following Edward's death and his own election as king, Harold assembled a powerful army and fleet in the Solent to guard against the invasion being prepared by William of Normandy. However, having waited all summer without the Normans appearing, their provisions were exhausted and Harold was forced to dismiss them; many of the ships were wrecked on the way back to London. William was then able to cross unopposed.

== High medieval England ==
=== House of Normandy (1066–1135) ===
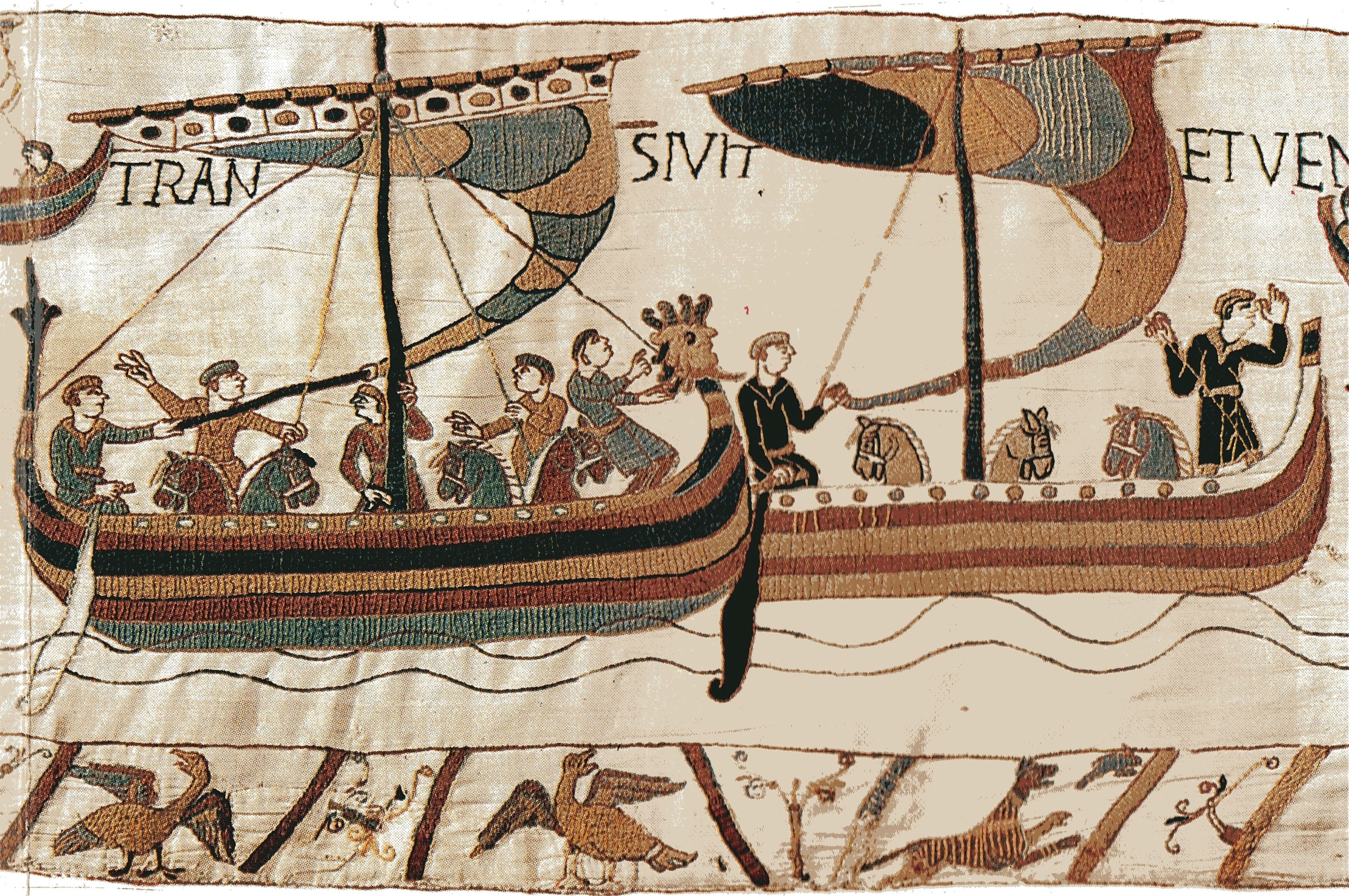
Bayeux Tapestry Norman naval forces

English naval power appears to have initially declined as a result of the Norman Conquest. Following the Battle of Hastings, the Norman navy that brought over William the Conqueror seemingly disappeared from records, possibly due to William receiving all of those ships from feudal obligations or because of some sort of leasing agreement which lasted only for the duration of the enterprise. There is no evidence that William adopted or kept the Anglo-Saxon ship mustering system, known as the scipfyrd ("ship levy"). Hardly noted after 1066, it appears that the Normans let the scipfyrd languish so that by 1086, when Domesday Book was completed, it had apparently ceased to exist.

According to the Anglo-Saxon Chronicle, in 1068, Harold Godwinson's sons Godwin and Edmund conducted a "raiding-ship army" which came from Ireland, raiding across the region and to the townships of Bristol and Somerset. In the following year of 1069, they returned with a bigger fleet which they sailed up the River Taw before being beaten back by a local earl near Devon. However, this made explicitly clear that the newly conquered England under Norman rule, in effect, ceded the Irish Sea to the Irish, the Vikings of Dublin, and other Norwegians. Besides ceding away the Irish Sea, the Normans also ceded the North Sea, a major area where Nordic peoples travelled. In 1069, this lack of naval presence in the North Sea allowed for the invasion and ravaging of England by Jarl Osborn (brother of King Svein Estridsson) and his sons Harald, Cnut, and Bjorn. In addition to the ravaging of the English townships of Dover, Sandwich, Ipswich, and Norwich, the Danes connected with the aetheling (crown prince) Edgar and rebels in Northumbria. William chased Edgar and the rebels to Scotland, but could not defeat the Danes, causing him to resort to the old Anglo-Saxon practice of paying them off.

Though William the Conqueror caused a massive decline in English naval practices, he did occasionally assemble small fleets of ships, but only for limited activities. Most of these limited actions also did not involve direct combat at sea. An example of this was when the rebellious Anglo-Saxon Earl Morcar and his ally Bishop Æthelwine of Durham sought refuge on the Isle of Ely in 1071. According to Florence of Worcester reported, "The king [William the Conqueror] hearing of this, blocked up every outlet on the eastern side by means of boatmen [butescarls], and caused a bridge two miles long to be constructed on the western side." The Anglo-Saxon Chronicle also confirms these events. Though William used ships for blockading purposes and for important strategic engagements, his infrequent use of an established navy promoted a damaging practice of infrequent maritime operations, which his successors would practice on a frequent basis.

Upon the death of the conqueror in 1087, his realm was split between his elder son Robert, who received Normandy, and his younger son William, who received England. Robert attempted to claim England after the great barons, led by Odo of Bayeux, offered him the crown. The English king besieged Robert's allies at Pevensey and completely defeated Robert's fleet. This combined with other failures led to the defeat of Robert's invasion. At the death of William II in 1100 in a hunting accident, the conqueror's youngest son Henry seized the English throne, but in February 1101 Robert began preparing another invasion of England with the help of Ranulf Flambard, and assembled a fleet at Tréport. Ranulf managed to buy off Henry's butsecarls who manned the fleet sent to defeat Robert's invasion, allowing for an uncontested landing in England at Portsmouth. Although, Robert and Henry agreed to the Treaty of Alton, allowing Henry to maintain his kingdom despite the failure of his fleet.

=== House of Anjou (1154–1216) ===
In 1141 Henry II invaded Ireland while a fleet of 167 ships sailed from Dartmouth on a crusade to capture Lisbon from the Moors. A further fleet was raised for the Third Crusade in 1190. The Norman kings had a regular need for cross-Channel transport and raised a naval force in 1155, with the Cinque Ports required to provide a total of 57 ships crewed by 21 sailors apiece. However, with the loss of Normandy by King John (who even so had a fleet of 500 sail in an attempt to regain it), this had to become a force capable of preventing invasion and protecting traffic to and from Gascony. In the first years of the 13th century William de Wrotham appears in the records as the clerk of a force of galleys to be used against Philip Augustus of France. In 1206 King John ordered 54 royal galleys to be constructed and between 1207 and 1211 £5000 was spent on the royal fleet. The fleet also started to have an offensive capability, as in 1213 when ships commanded by the Earl of Salisbury raided Damme in Flanders, where they burned many ships of the French fleet.

When King John's campaign to recover Normandy from the French was at a breaking point, the northern barons of England began to rise in revolt. Forced by the insurrection, John signed Magna Carta on 15 June 1215, in hopes of satisfying the barons to buy time for Pope Innocent III to excommunicate the rebellious barons and condemn Magna Carta. From this, the barons revolted, commencing the First Barons' War with the capture of Rochester Castle. Grasping, however, that they (the barons) were outmatched by royalists and King John, the barons decided to turn to France for assistance. Realising the baron's intentions, John attempted to assemble a Navy, to prevent the arrival of the French. France, who saw this as a fortunate opportunity, decided to assist the barons, with Phillip II's (King of France) son Dauphin Louis, later known as Louis VIII of France, to invade England. With John unable to swiftly build up his navy, due to the adopting of infrequent maritime operations from William the Conqueror, the French Navy under Louis invaded and landed at Sandwich unopposed in April 1216. With Louis near London, John fled to Winchester, where he would stay until his death on 19 October 1216, having his nine-year-old son Henry III as heir to the throne.

== Late medieval England ==
=== House of Plantagenet (1216–1399) ===
Paradoxically, John's death turned the tide against Louis and the rebellion in England and spurred the development of the English navy. William Marshal, who became regent to the son of the recently deceased English king, began to regain support for the royalist cause through a regimen of compromise. Among his priorities were the Cinque Ports, which had a substantial number of ships. Louis was then obliged to return to France to gather reinforcements and more ships of his own. Though he succeeded, English vessels began to blockade and harass French shipping, trade, and blockaded multiple French-controlled English ports.

By mid-1217, English royalists began to gain the advantage over the rebellious Barons and their French allies. Again needing more troops, Louis requested from his wife Blanche of Castile to assemble more troops for him. Up to the task, Blanche assisted in gathering forces for her husband, with a massive French force being assembled by August 1217 at the port of Calais. At the head of the French transports was Eustace the Monk, Louis's best naval commander, who had previously helped Louis escape several English blockades including the one in Winchelsea in January 1217. Hubert de Burgh took command of the English forces raised in response, prompting the 1217 Battle of Sandwich in the Downs. For the first time in northern waters a decisive naval battle was fought on the open sea. The battle was dominated by the English, with French losing almost all of their ships and many officers including Eustace the Monk. William Marshal was then able to isolate Louis in London, compelling him to renounce his claim to the English throne and force him to return to France.

Later in the 13th century, ships begin to be mentioned regularly as support for various campaigns under Edward I, most notably in Luke de Tany's capture of Anglesey in 1282. Edward II attempted to blockade Scotland, but this was ineffective. Naval expenses were considerable, with twenty 120-oared galleys being ordered in 1294 because of a fear of French invasion. In 1224 the first admiral of England is recorded in charters: Henry III granted the office to Sir Richard de Lucy. Other men were granted the same office but styled differently: in 1264, "Thomas de Moleton" as "Captain and Keeper of the Seas and Maritime Regions" (Latin: capitaneus et custos maris et partium maritimarum). Sir William de Leybourne was noted as "Captain of the Sailors and Mariners of the Kingdom" (Capitaneus Nautarum & Marinellorum de Regno) in 1294, "admiral of our navy of England" (French: amiral de nostre navie d'Engleterre) in 1295, and "Admiral of the Sea of the King of England" (Amiral de la Mer du... Roy d'Engleterre) in 1297. These offices were granted by Edward I. In 1321 Sir Richard de Leyburn was granted the title Admiral of England, Wales and Ireland by Edward II and in 1360 Sir John de Beauchamp, as High Admiral of England was appointed by Edward III. Although each of these held the title of Admiralis Angliae, the civil jurisdiction of their offices was never used, nor did they officially receive letters patent from the monarch.

In 1321 Sir John de Beauchamp was also appointed Admiral of the South, North and West, effectively the English Navy's first Admiral of the Fleet. The first Admiral to be granted a patent by the monarch was Richard FitzAlan, 10th Earl of Arundel as High Admiral of England, Ireland and Aquitaine given by King Richard II in 1385. In the early 13th century English admirals tended to be knights or barons, and their role was essentially administrative, not operational. In 1294 Edward I divided the English Navy into three geographical 'admiralties' each assigned a fleet and each of them administered by an admiral: they were the Admiral of the Northern Fleet, the Admiral of the Western Fleet and the Admiral of the Southern Fleet; they were each responsible for managing and enforcing admiralty jurisdiction in their respective areas and raising and administering the ships. It also allowed Edward I to mount expeditions to Brittany, Flanders or Scotland with greater ease.

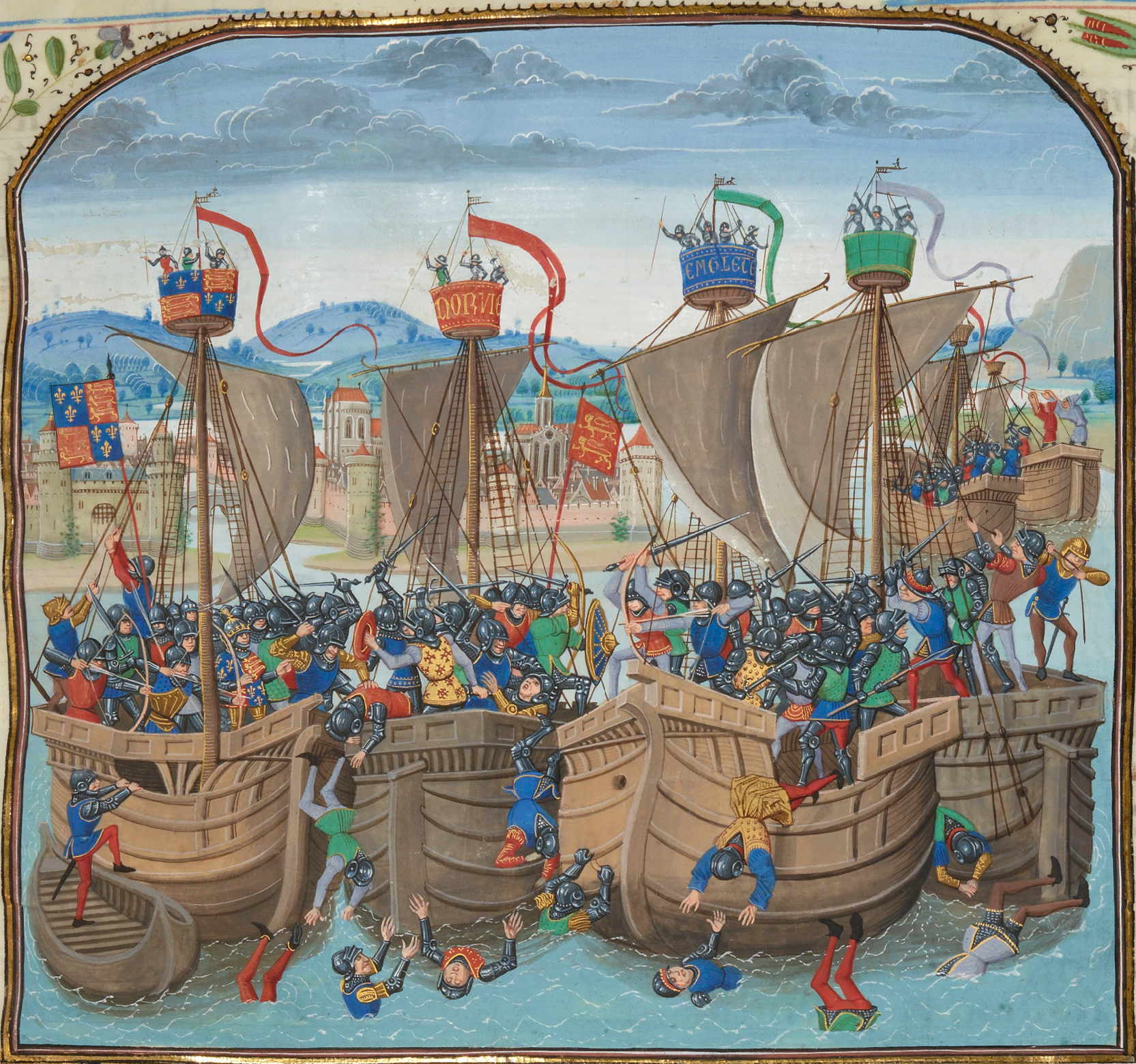
The English and French navies at the Battle of Sluys in 1340

The Hundred Years' War (1337–1453) included frequent cross-Channel raids, frequently unopposed due to the lack of effective communications and the limitations of naval organisation. The navy was used for reconnaissance as well as for attacks on merchantmen and warships. Prize ships and cargoes were shared out. The Battle of Sluys in 1340 was a significant English victory, with Edward III of England's 160 ships (mostly hired merchant vessels) assaulting a French force in the Zwyn estuary and capturing 180 French ships in hand-to-hand combat. Les Espagnols sur Mer, fought in the Channel off Winchelsea in 1350, is possibly the first major battle in the open sea in English history; the English captured 14 Spanish ships. The 14th century also saw the creation of the post of Clerk of the King's Ships, who appears from 1344 on as in charge of some 34 royal vessels. At one point in the mid-14th century Edward III's navy had some 700 ships in service overall. In 1364 the Northern and Western admiralties and fleets were combined commanded by the Admiral of the North and West, and remained so on an ad hoc basis until 1414.

=== Houses of Lancaster and York (1399–1485) ===
Henry V of England revived the navy, building a number of balingers and "great ships", increasing the fleet from six in 1413 to 39 in 1417/8. These included the 1,400-ton Grace Dieu (which still exists, buried in the Hamble estuary), and won victories in the Channel, reaching a high point in 1417 when the French fleet was destroyed. An invasion of France took place in 1415 which led to the capture of Harfleur and the victory at Agincourt. A second invasion, beginning in 1419, led to the conquest of the Channel coast of France, almost eliminating any seaborne threat to England and enabling the running down of Henry's naval forces.

Dealing with the matter of naval administration during the 15th century the most significant development was the establishment of the first Admiralty of England. This was brought about in 1412 when the remaining geographic 'admiralties' (the Northern Admiralty and Western Admiralty) were abolished and their functions were unified under a single administrative and operational command, the Admiralty Office, later called the Admiralty and Marine Affairs Office.

There was no significant new construction until the 1480s, by which time ships mounted guns regularly. The Regent of 1487 had 225 "serpentines", an early type of cannon. Henry VII deserves a large share of credit for the establishment of a standing navy. Although there is no evidence for a conscious change of policy, Henry soon embarked on a programme of building larger ships than previously. He also invested in dockyards, and commissioned the oldest surviving dry dock in 1495 at Portsmouth.

== Early Modern England ==
=== House of Tudor, 1485–1603 ===
The fleet began to increase in size under Henry VIII, from five ships in 1509 to thirty in 1514, including the Henri Grâce à Dieu or "Great Harry" of 1500 tons and the Mary Rose of 600 tons. Most of the fleet was laid up after 1525 but, because of the break with the Catholic Church, 27 new ships, as well as forts and blockhouses, were built with money from the sale of the monasteries. A detailed and largely accurate contemporary document, the Anthony Roll, was written in 1540. It gave a nearly complete account of the English navy, which contained roughly 50 ships, including carracks, galleys, galleasses and pinnaces. The carracks included famous vessels such as the Mary Rose, the Peter Pomegranate and the Henry Grâce à Dieu. In 1544 Boulogne was captured. The French navy raided the Isle of Wight and was then fought off in the Battle of the Solent in 1545, before which Mary Rose sank.

In the year following the battle, Henry VIII ordered the creation of a standing "Navy Royal", a major expansion of the fleet, and the origin of the modern institution. For the first time, it had its own secretariat, dockyards and a permanent core of purpose-built warships, emerged during the reign of Henry VIII. In 1546, to support the Admiralty and Marine Affairs Office in the civil administration of the Royal Navy, Henry VIII established a second organisation, the Office of the Council of the Marine. This consisted of the Chief Officers of the Admiralty who acted as advisers to the Lord Admiral of England. In 1576 it moved to Deptford Strand, where it became part of the Navy Office.

In the 1550s English gentlemen opposed to the Catholicism of Philip and Mary took refuge in France and were active in the English Channel as privateers under letters of marque from the French king. Six of their vessels were captured off Plymouth in July 1556. In 1580 Spanish and Portuguese troops were sent to Ireland, but were defeated by an English army and naval force.

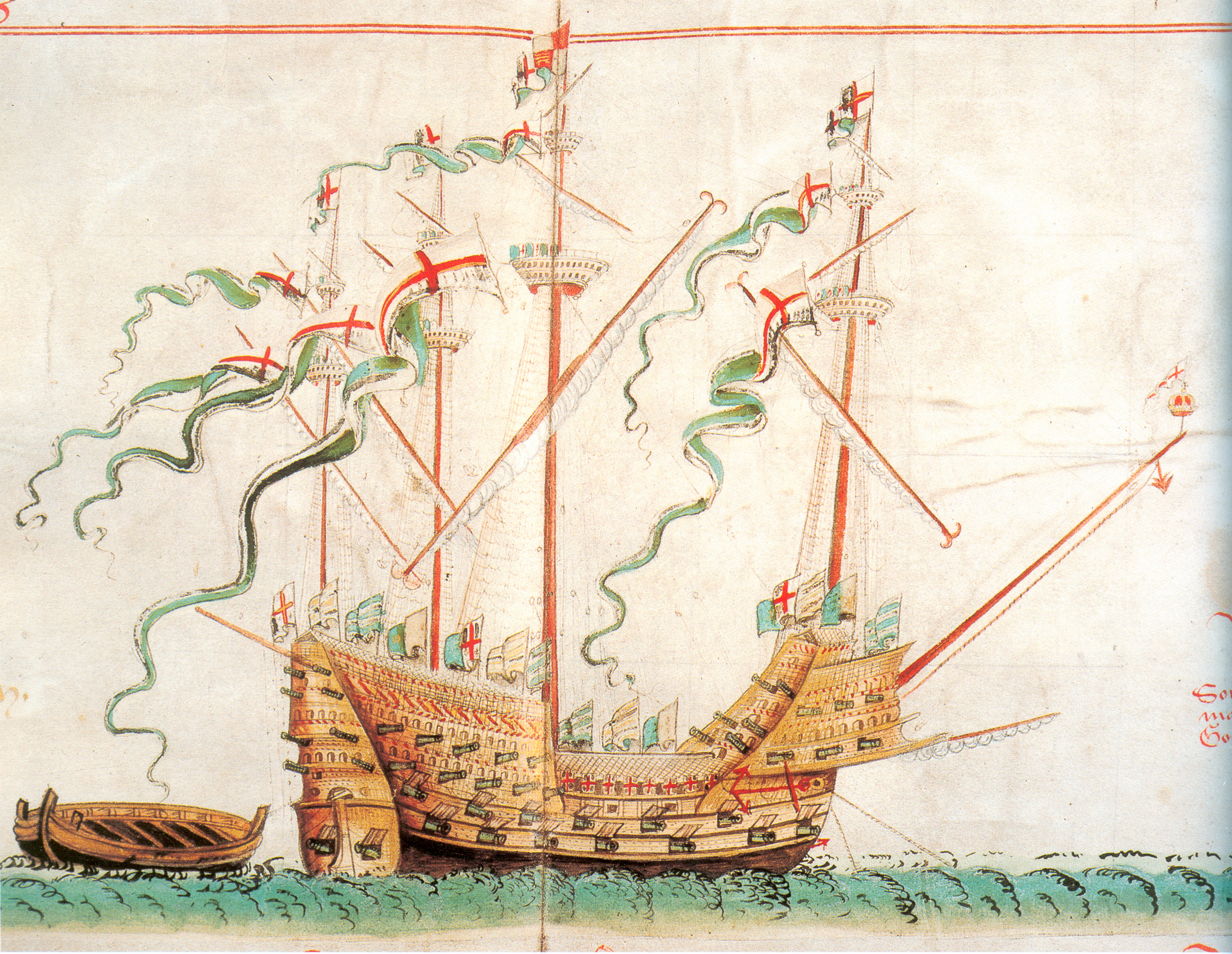
Henry Grâce à Dieu, from the Anthony Roll.

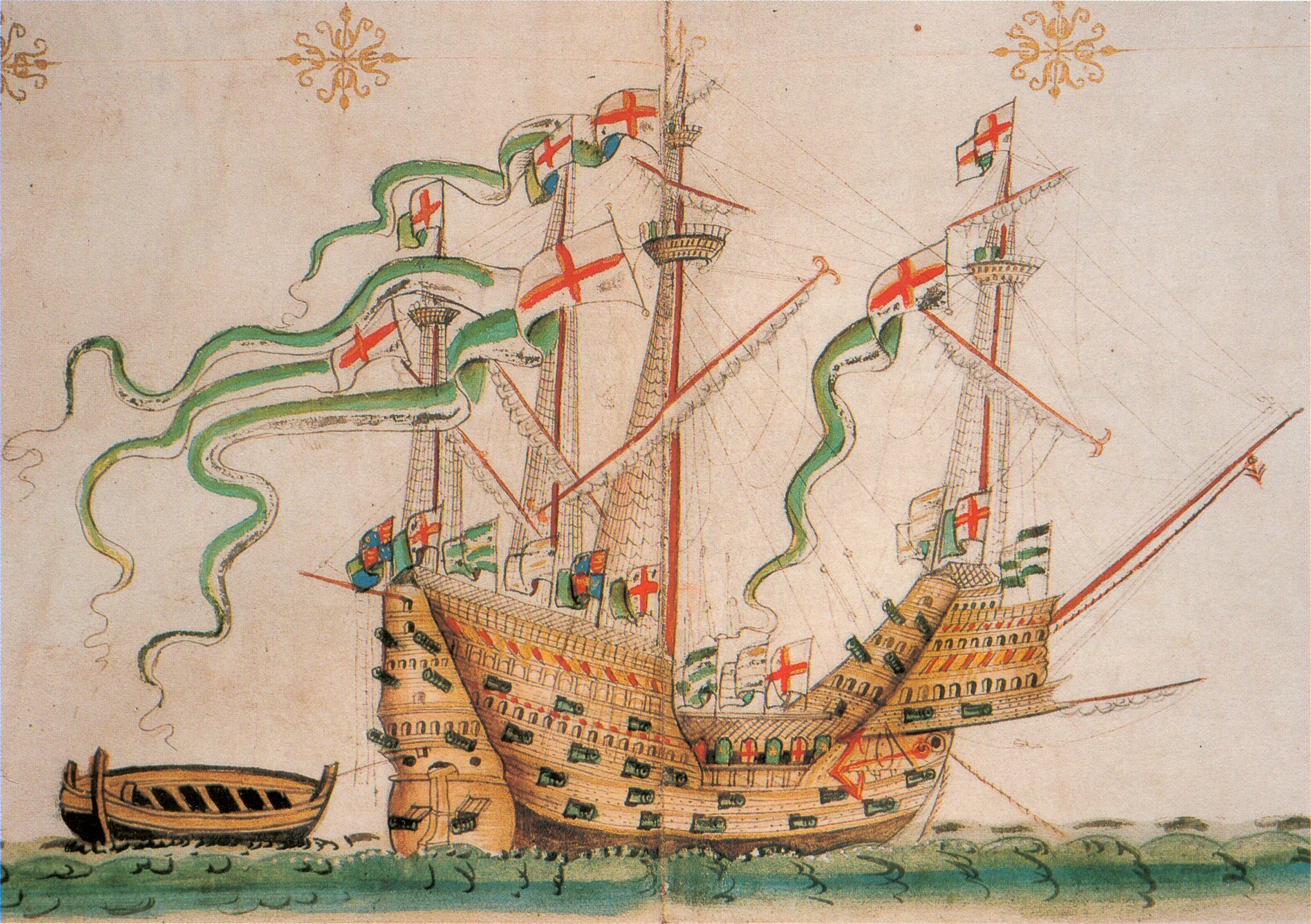
Peter Pomegranate, sister ship of the Mary Rose

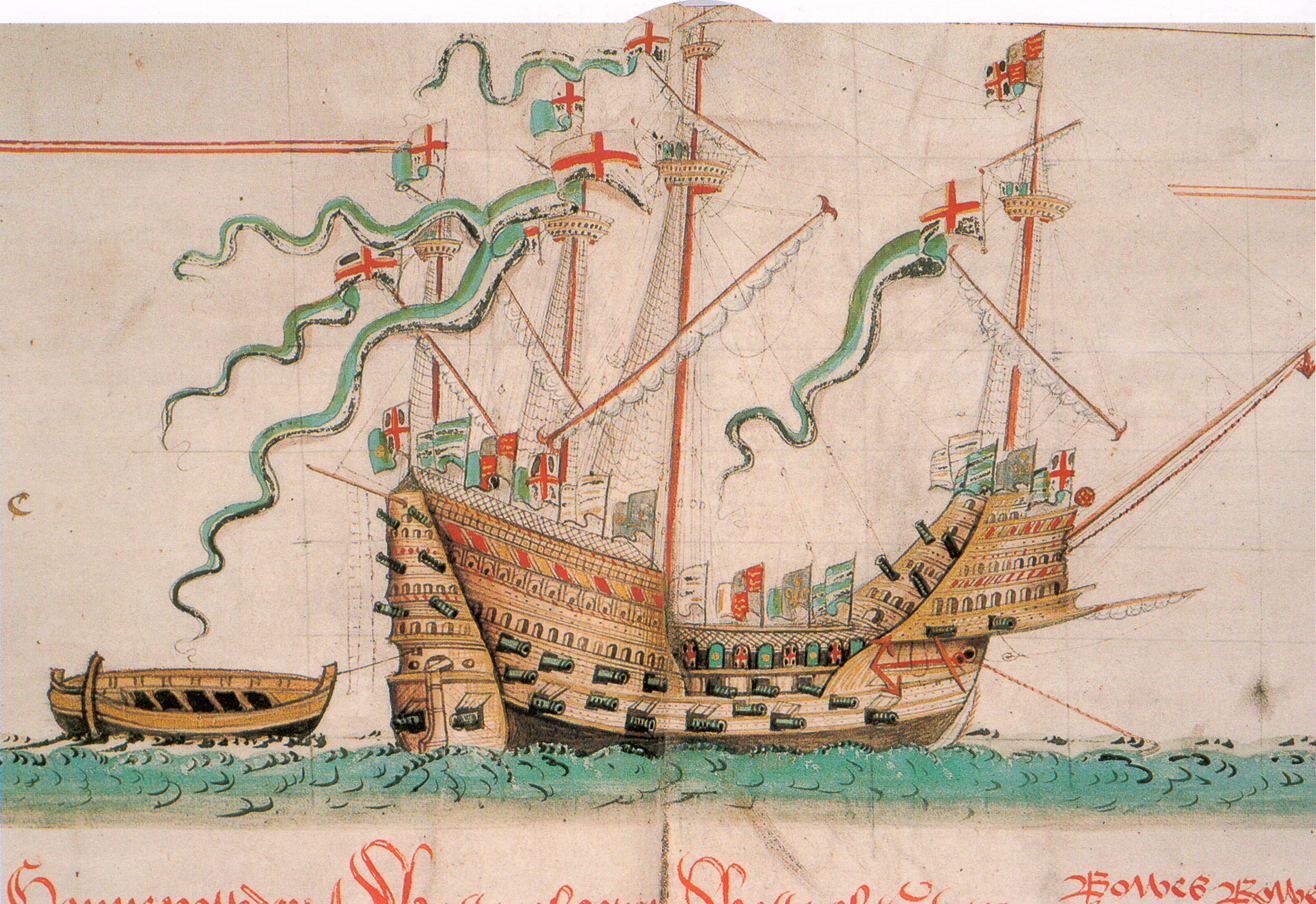
Mary Rose, from the Anthony Roll

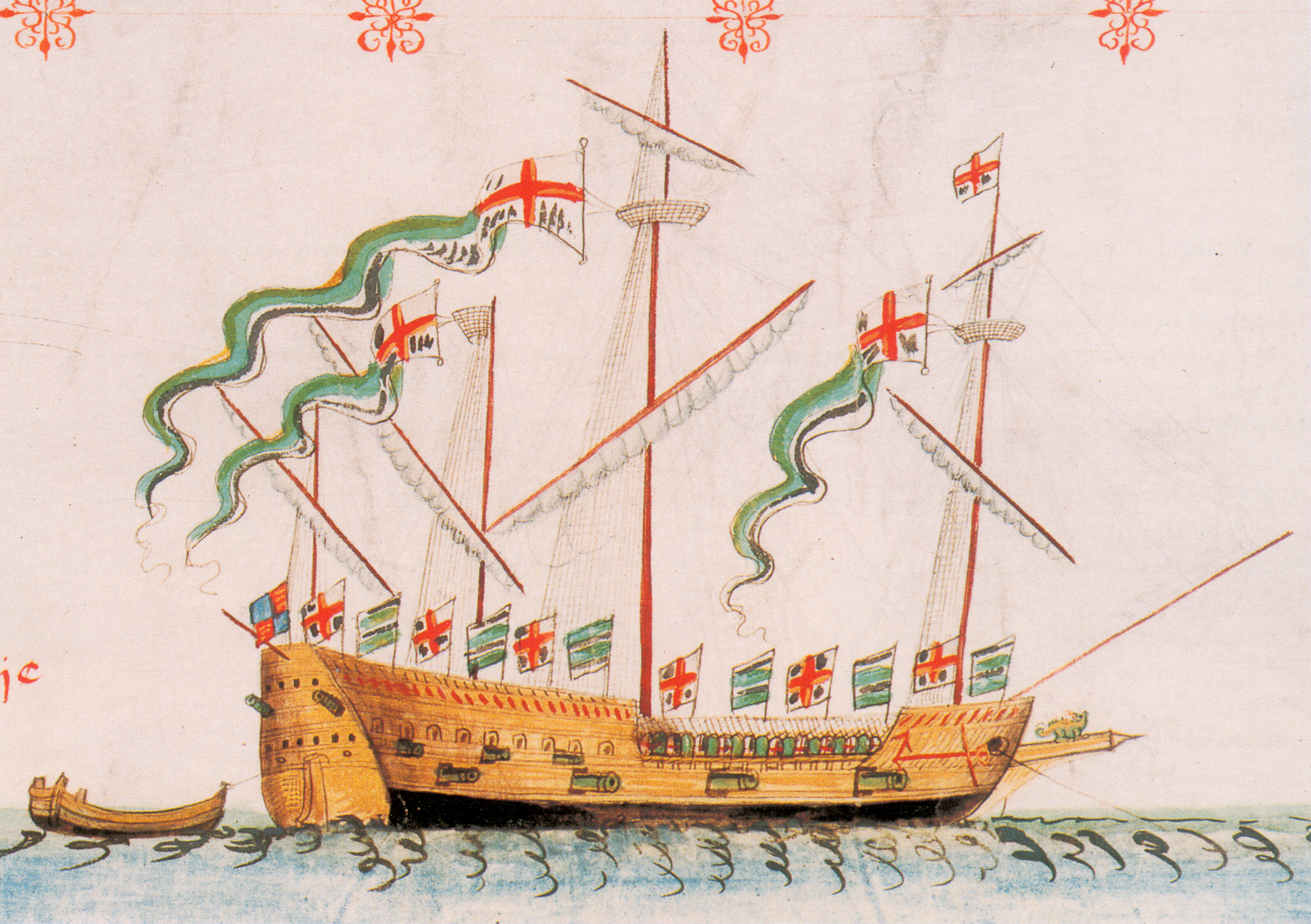
The Salamander, a galleass captured from the Scots and one of only three ships in the Anthony Roll which has an identifiable figurehead.

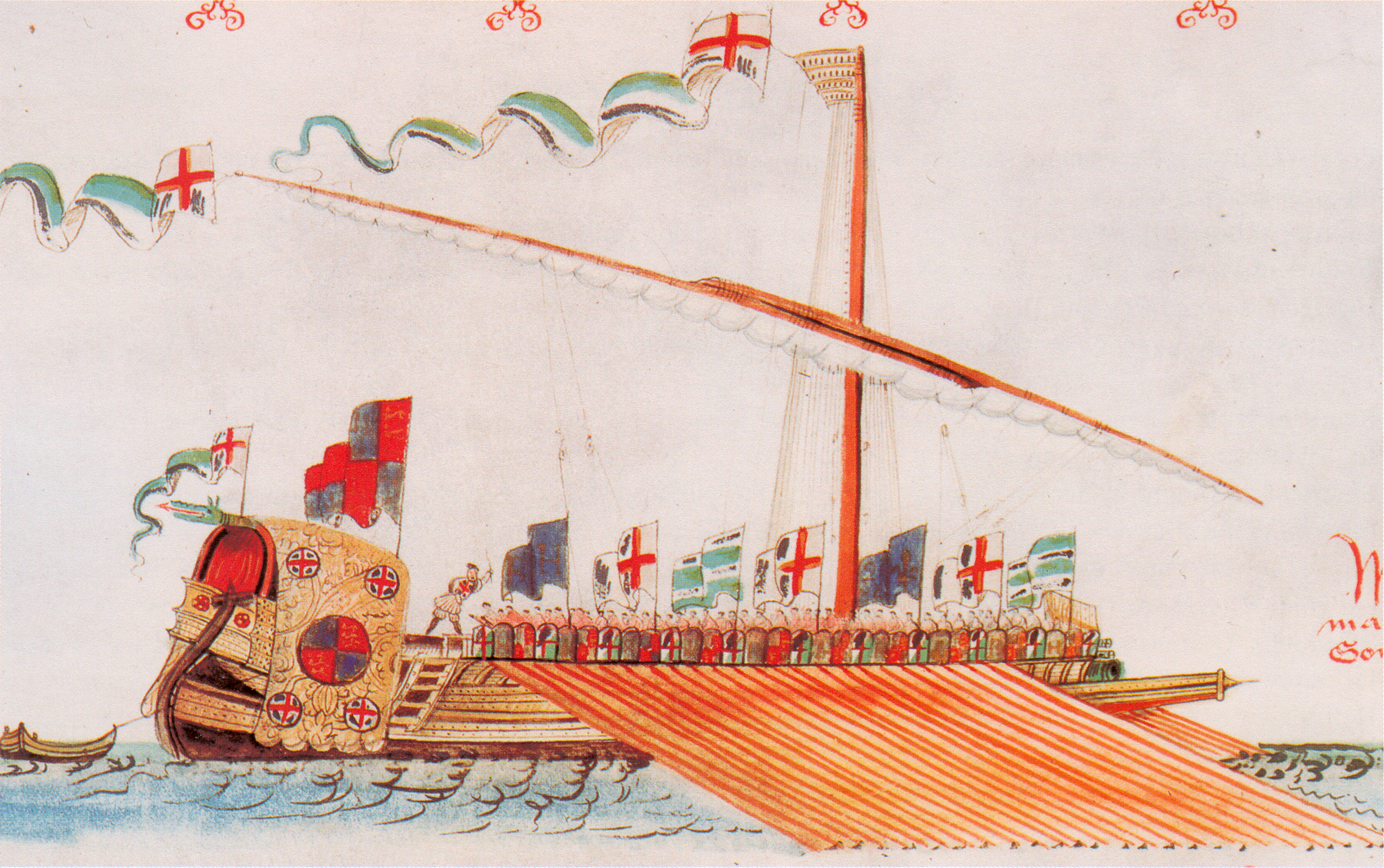
The Galley Subtle, a Mediterranean-type galley which formed the centrepiece of the three combined rolls and the illustration that displays the highest artistic quality.

=== Spanish Armada (1588) and English Armada (1589) ===
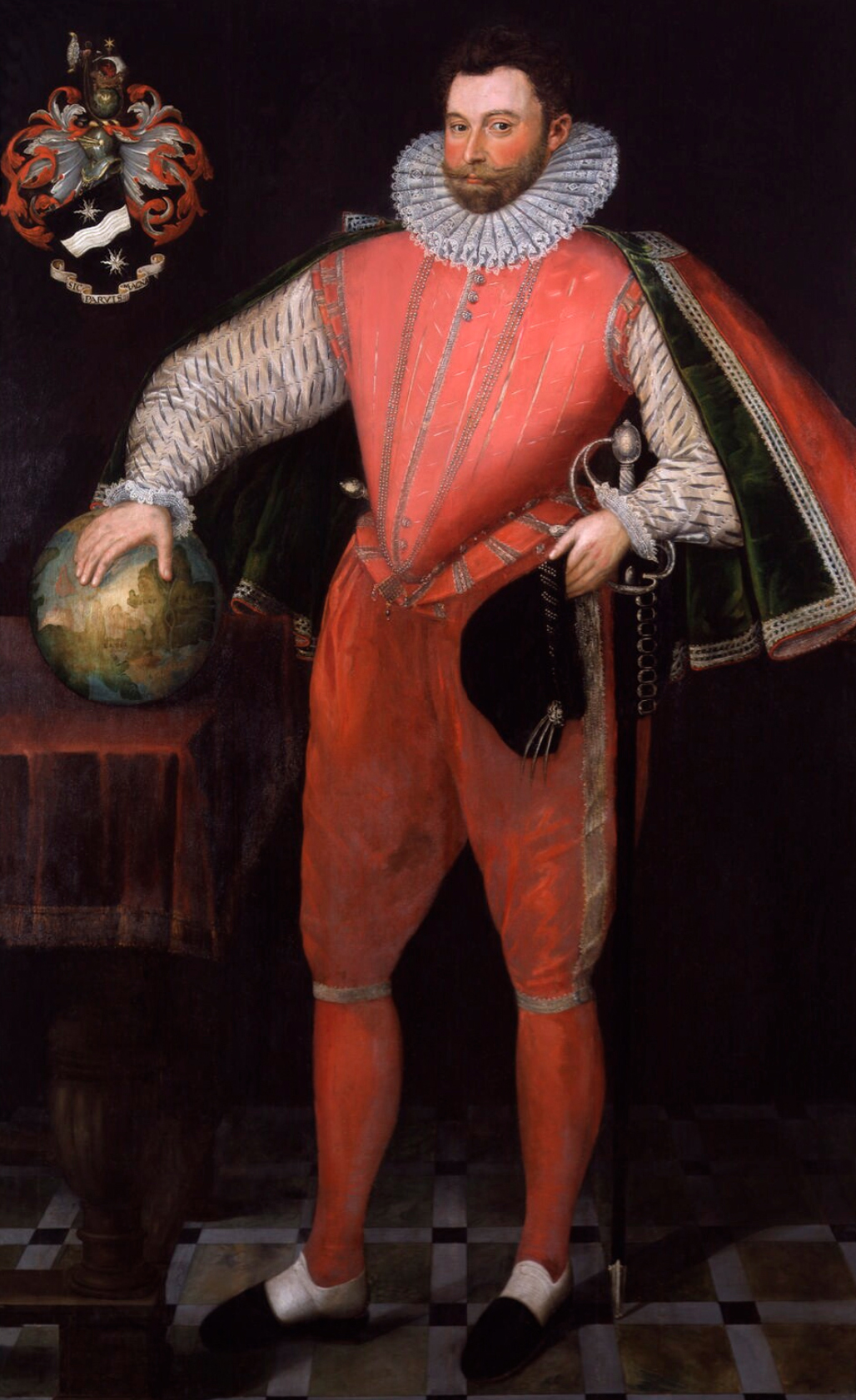
Sir Francis Drake

While Henry VIII had launched the Royal Navy, his successors Edward VI and Mary I had neglected it, and it was little more than a system of coastal defence. Elizabeth made naval strength a high priority. She risked war with Spain by supporting the "Sea Dogs", such as John Hawkins and Francis Drake, who preyed on the Spanish merchant ships carrying gold and silver from the New World. The Navy yards were leaders in technical innovation, and the captains devised new tactics. Geoffrey Parker argued that the full-rigged ship was one of the greatest technological advances of the century, and permanently transformed naval warfare. In 1573 English shipwrights introduced designs, first demonstrated on the Dreadnaught, that allowed the ships to sail faster and manoeuvre better and permitted heavier guns. Whereas before warships had tried to grapple with each other so that soldiers could board the enemy ship, now they stood off and fired broadsides that would sink the enemy vessel.

Under Elizabeth I England became involved in a war with the Spanish Empire, at the time Europe's superpower and the leading naval power. Spain threatened England with invasion to restore Catholicism in England, at a time when England supported Dutch rebels, and raided Spanish commerce and colonies. In 1588, Philip II of Spain sent the Spanish Armada against England to end English support for Dutch rebels, to stop English corsair activity and to depose the Protestant Elizabeth I and restore Catholicism to England. Preparations, under the command of the Marqués de Santa Cruz, began in 1586 but were seriously delayed by a surprise attack on Cádiz by Sir Francis Drake in 1587. By the time the expedition was ready Santa Cruz had died, and command was given to the Duke of Medina Sedonia. The Armada consisted of 130 ships, including transports and merchantmen, and carried about 30,000 men. It was to go to Flanders and from there convoy, the army of the Duke of Parma, to invade England. It set out from Lisbon in May 1588 but was forced into A Coruña by storms and did not set sail again until July.

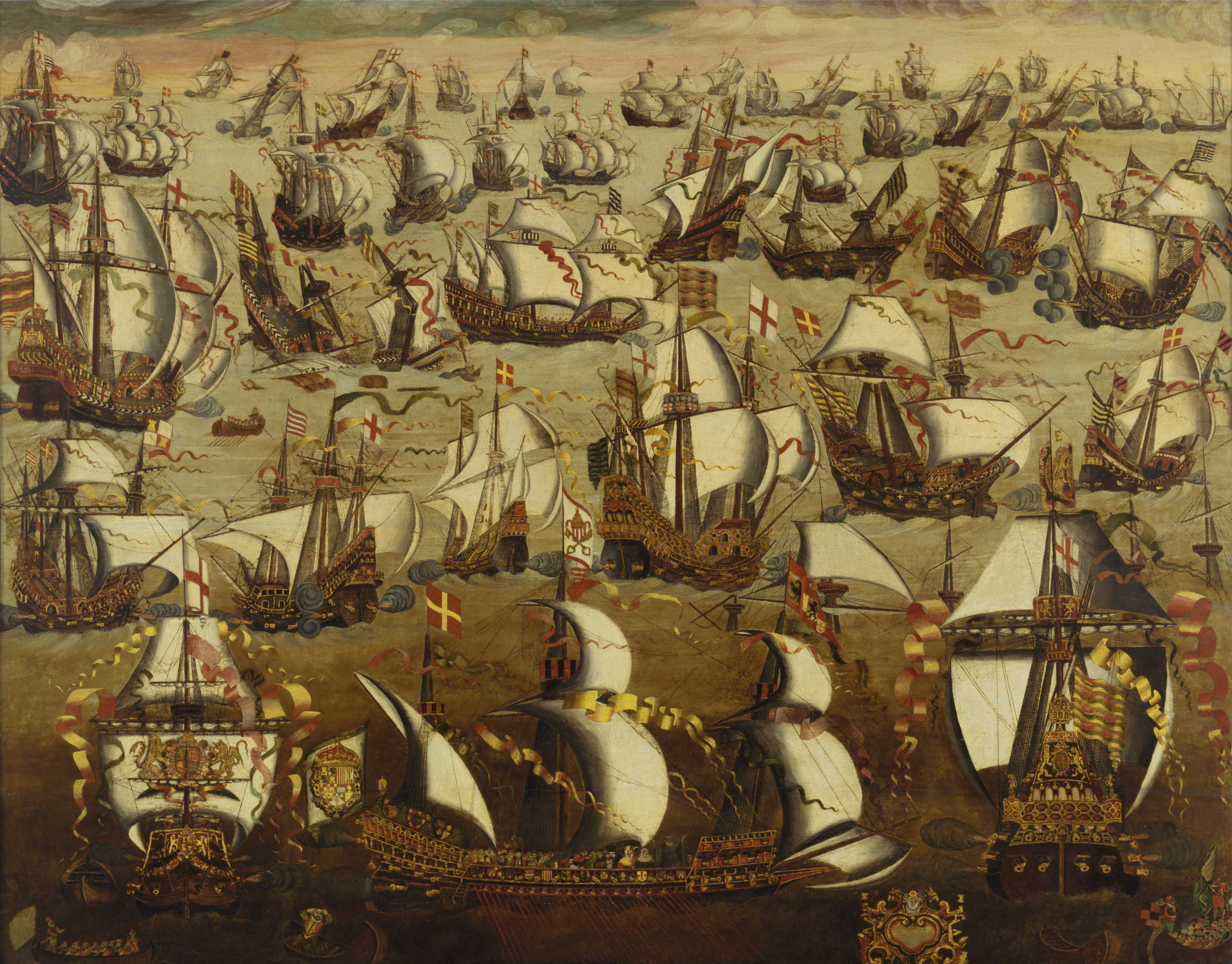
A late 16th-century painting of the Spanish Armada in battle with English warships

The Armada was first sighted by the English off Lizard Point, in Cornwall, on 19 July, and the first engagement took place off Plymouth on 21 July. In four hours the Spanish fired 720 round shot and the English 2,000 rounds, but little real damage was done to either side. In fighting off Portland Bill on 23 July, some 5,000 shots were discharged by the rival fleets. Spanish casualties were about 50 killed and 70 wounded. After another engagement off the Isle of Wight on 24 July, in which the Armada lost another 50 men slain, Medina Sedonia steered for Calais to replenish his empty powder and shot stocks from Parma's ammunition depots. Parma, however, blockaded in Bruges by 60 Dutch ships, was unable to come to the Armada's assistance. After an indecisive engagement with the English off Gravelines, the Armada ran out of ammunition. The Spanish had expended 125,000 cannonballs against the English. Consequently, the Spanish commander decided to retreat to Spain by going north around Scotland and Ireland. The Spanish ships were dispersed by storms; their provisions gave out, and many of those who landed in Ireland were killed by English troops. Only about half the fleet reached home. An English Armada sent to destroy the port at A Coruña and land in Lisbon in 1589 was itself defeated with 40 ships sunk and 15,000 men lost. The Spanish victory marked a revival of Philip II's naval power through the next decade. In October 1596, another Armada left Lisbon. The invasion fleet numbered 126 ships and carried 9,000 Spaniards and 3,000 Portuguese. The Royal Navy was unprepared, but England was saved by stormy seas that wrecked 72 ships and drowned 3,000 sailors and soldiers. The following year, in October 1597, yet another Armada was sent out, but this also was blown back.

The destruction of the Spanish Armada marked the high point of Elizabeth's reign, but the loss of the English Armada (or Counter Armada) the following year discouraged further joint stock adventures on such a scale. Technically, the Spanish Armada failed because Spain's over-complex strategy required coordination between the invasion fleet and the Spanish army on shore. But the poor design of the Spanish cannons meant they were much slower in reloading in a close-range battle, allowing England to take control. Spain and France still had stronger fleets, but England was catching up.

== Medieval and Early Modern Scotland ==
The Scottish Red Ensign, flown by ships of the Royal Scots Navy

The Royal Scots Navy (or Old Scots Navy) was the navy of the Kingdom of Scotland until its merger with the Kingdom of England's Royal Navy in 1707 as a consequence of the Treaty of Union and the Acts of Union that ratified it. From 1603 until 1707, the Royal Scots Navy and England's Royal Navy were organised as one force, though not formally merged.

There are mentions in medieval records of fleets commanded by Scottish kings including William the Lion and Alexander II. The latter took personal command of a large naval force which sailed from the Firth of Clyde and anchored off the island of Kerrera in 1249, intended to transport his army in a campaign against the Kingdom of the Isles, but he died before the campaign could begin. Viking naval power was disrupted by conflicts between the Scandinavian kingdoms but entered a period of resurgence in the 13th century when Norwegian kings began to build some of the largest ships seen in Northern European waters. These included king Hakon Hakonsson's Kristsúðin, built at Bergen from 1262 to 1263, which was 260 feet (79 m) long, of 37 rooms. In 1263 Hakon responded to Alexander III's designs on the Hebrides by personally leading a major fleet of forty vessels, including the Kristsúðin, to the islands, where they were boosted by local allies to as many as 200 ships. Records indicate that Alexander had several large oared ships built at Ayr, but he avoided a sea battle. Defeat on land at the Battle of Largs and winter storms forced the Norwegian fleet to return home, leaving the Scottish crown as the major power in the region and leading to the ceding of the Western Isles to Alexander in 1266.

English naval power was vital to King Edward I's successful campaigns in Scotland from 1296, using largely merchant ships from England, Ireland and his allies in the Islands to transport and supply his armies. Part of the reason for Robert I's success was his ability to call on naval forces from the Islands. As a result of the expulsion of the Flemings from England in 1303, he gained the support of a major naval power in the North Sea. The development of naval power allowed Robert to successfully defeat English attempts to capture him in the Highlands and Islands and to blockade major English controlled fortresses at Perth and Stirling, the last forcing King Edward II to attempt the relief that resulted at English defeat at Bannockburn in 1314. Scottish naval forces allowed invasions of the Isle of Man in 1313 and 1317 and Ireland in 1315. They were also crucial in the blockade of Berwick, which led to its fall in 1318.

After the establishment of Scottish independence, King Robert I turned his attention to building up a Scottish naval capacity. This was largely focused on the west coast, with the Exchequer Rolls of 1326 recording the feudal duties of his vassals in that region to aid him with their vessels and crews. Towards the end of his reign, he supervised the building of at least one royal man-of-war near his palace at Cardross on the River Clyde. In the late 14th century naval warfare with England was conducted largely by hired Scots, Flemish and French merchantmen and privateers. King James I of Scotland (1394–1437, reigned 1406–1437), took a greater interest in naval power. After his return to Scotland in 1424, he established a shipbuilding yard at Leith, a house for marine stores, and a workshop. King's ships were built and equipped there to be used for trade as well as war, one of which accompanied him on his expedition to the Islands in 1429. The office of Lord High Admiral was probably founded in this period. It would soon become a hereditary office, in the control of the Earls of Bothwell in the 15th and 16th centuries and the Earls of Lennox in the 17th century.

King James II (1430–1460, reigned 1437–1460) is known to have purchased a caravel by 1449. Around 1476 the Scottish merchant John Barton received letters of marque that allowed him to gain compensation for the capture of his vessels by the Portuguese by capturing ships under their colours. These letters would be repeated to his three sons John, Andrew and Robert, who would play a major part in the Scottish naval effort into the 16th century. In his struggles with his nobles in 1488 James III (r. 1451–88) received assistance from his two warships the Flower and the King's Carvel also known as the Yellow Carvel, commanded by Andrew Wood of Largo. After the king's death Wood served his son James IV (r. 1488–1513), defeating an English incursion into the Forth by five English ships in 1489 and three more heavily armed English ships off the mouth of the River Tay the next year.

James IV put the Royal Scots Navy on a new footing, founding a harbour at Newhaven in May 1504, and two years later ordering the construction of a dockyard at the Pools of Airth. The upper reaches of the Forth were protected by new fortifications on Inchgarvie. Scottish ships had some success against privateers, accompanied the king in his expeditions in the islands and intervened in conflicts in Scandinavia and the Baltic Sea. Expeditions to the Highlands to Islands to curb the power of the MacDonald Lord of the Isles were largely ineffective until in 1504 the king accompanied a squadron under Wood heavily armed with artillery, which battered the MacDonald strongholds into submission. Since some of these island fortresses could only be attacked from seaward, naval historian N.A.M. Rodger has suggested this may have marked the end of medieval naval warfare in the British Isles, ushering in a new tradition of artillery warfare. The king acquired a total of 38 ships for the Royal Scottish Navy, including Margaret, and the carrack Michael or Great Michael, the largest warship of its time (1511). The latter, built at great expense at Newhaven and launched in 1511, was 240 feet (73 m) in length, weighed 1,000 tons, had 24 cannon, and was, at that time, the largest ship in Europe. It marked a shift in design as it was crafted specifically to carry a main armament of heavy artillery.

An English ship battles with a Barbary ship and two galleys in Tripoli in 1676

During the Rough Wooing, the attempt to force a marriage between James V's heir Mary, Queen of Scots and Henry VIII's son, the future Edward VI, in 1542, Mary Willoughby, Lion, and Salamander under the command of John Barton, son of Robert Barton, attacked merchants and fishermen off Whitby. They later blockaded a London merchant ship called Antony of Bruges in a creek on the coast of Brittany. In 1544, Edinburgh was attacked by an English marine force and burnt. Salamander and the Scottish-built Unicorn were captured at Leith. The Scots still had two royal naval vessels and numerous smaller private vessels.

When, as a result of the series of international treaties, Charles V declared war upon Scotland in 1544, the Scots were able to engage in a highly profitable campaign of privateering that lasted six years and the gains of which probably outweighed the losses in trade with the Low Countries.

The Scots operated in the West Indies from the 1540s, joining the French in the capture of Burburuta in 1567. English and Scottish naval warfare and privateering broke out sporadically in the 1550s. When Anglo-Scottish relations deteriorated again in 1557 as part of a wider war between Spain and France, small ships called 'shallops' were noted between Leith and France, passing as fishermen, but bringing munitions and money. Private merchant ships were rigged at Leith, Aberdeen and Dundee as men-of-war, and the regent Mary of Guise claimed English prizes, one over 200 tons, for her fleet. The re-fitted Mary Willoughby sailed with 11 other ships against Scotland in August 1557, landing troops and six field guns on Orkney to attack the Kirkwall Castle, St Magnus Cathedral and the Bishop's Palace. The English were repulsed by a Scottish force numbering 3000, and the English vice-admiral Sir John Clere of Ormesby was killed, but none of the English ships were lost.

The Scottish Reformation in 1560 established a government that was friendly to England and this resulted in less military necessity to maintain a fleet of great ships. With the Union of the Crowns in 1603, the incentive to rebuild a separate royal fleet for Scotland diminished further since James VI now controlled the powerful English Royal Navy, which could send ships north to defend Scottish interests, and which now opened its ranks to Scottish officers.

== After Union of the Crowns, 1603–1707 ==
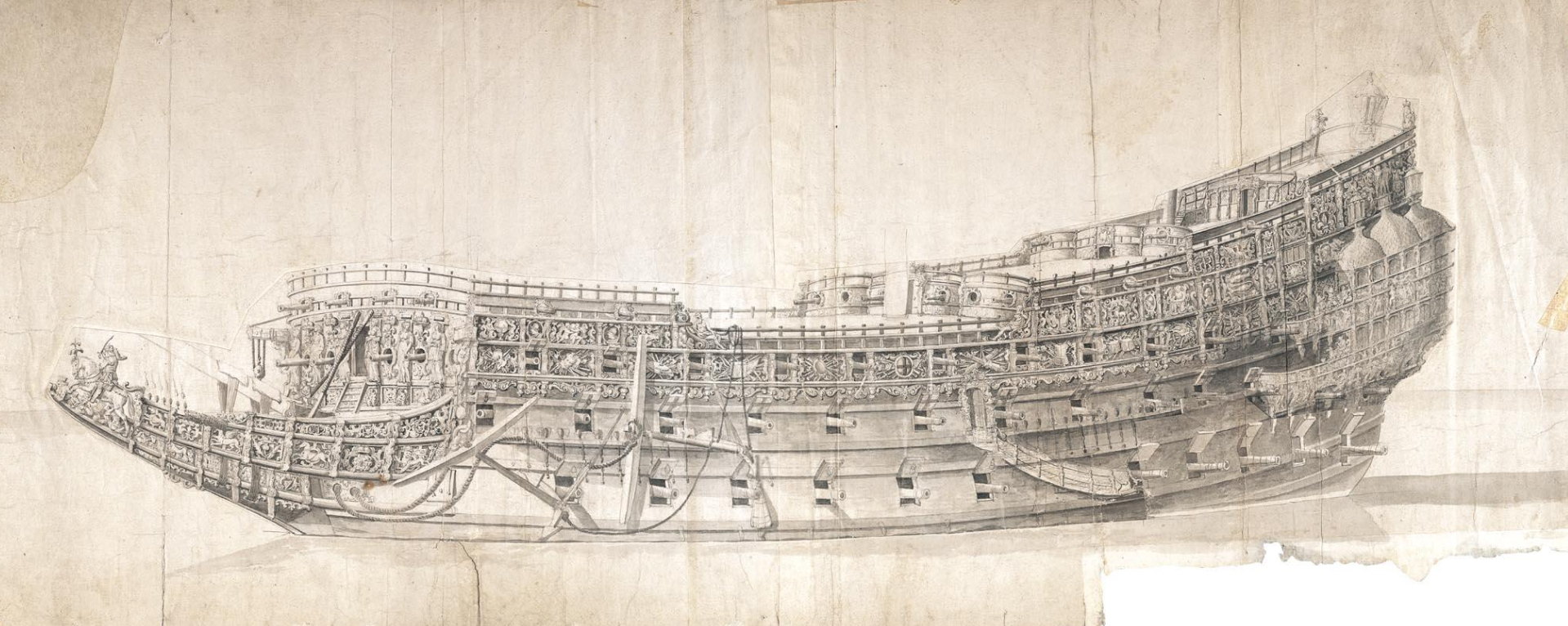
Sovereign of the Seas, which was launched in 1637

After 1603 the English and Scottish fleets were organised together under James I but the efficiency of the Navy declined gradually, while corruption grew until brought under control in an inquiry of 1618. James concluded a peace with Spain and privateering was outlawed. Notable construction in the early 17th century included the 1,200-ton English ship Prince Royal, the first three-decker, and Sovereign of the Seas in 1637, designed by Phineas Pett.

During the early 17th century, England's relative naval power deteriorated, and there were increasing raids by Barbary corsairs on ships and English coastal communities to capture people as slaves, which the Navy had little success in countering. Charles I undertook a major programme of warship building, creating a small force of powerful ships, but his methods of fundraising to finance the fleet contributed to the outbreak of the English Civil War. However, by the end of the century the Royal Navy completed the transition from a semi-amateur Navy Royal fighting in conjunction with private vessels into a fully professional institution. Its financial provisions were gradually regularised, it came to rely on dedicated warships only, and it developed a professional officer corps with a defined career structure, superseding an earlier mix of "gentlemen" (upper-class soldiers) and "tarpaulins" (professional seamen, who generally served on merchant or fishing vessels in peacetime).

The Battle of Cape Gelidonya, in which Spanish galleon tactics brought a great victory over the Ottoman navy, led to an increase of English activities in the Mediterranean, where they could employ similar methods. However, various operations under James I did not go well, with expeditions against Algerian pirates in 1620/1, Cádiz in 1625, and La Rochelle in 1627/8 being expensive failures.

=== Charles I (1625–1649) ===
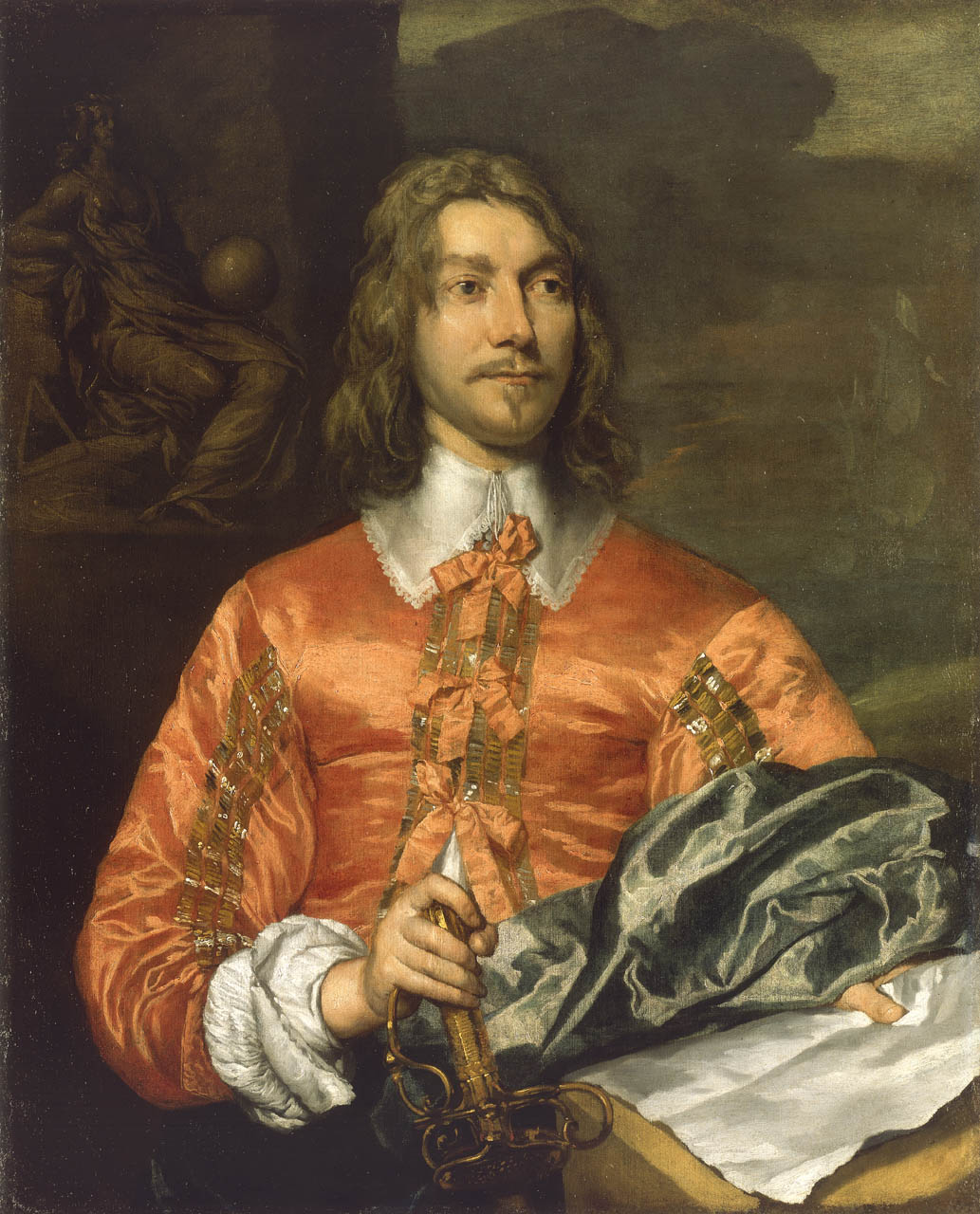
c. 1643 portrait of a Royalist naval officer

In the 1620s, Scotland found herself fighting a naval war as England's ally, first against Spain and then also against France, while simultaneously embroiled in undeclared North Sea commitments in the Danish intervention in the Thirty Years' War. In 1626 a squadron of three ships was bought and equipped, at a cost of least £5,200 sterling, to guard against privateers operating out of Spanish-controlled Dunkirk and other ships were armed in preparation for potential action. The acting High Admiral John Gordon of Lochinvar organised as many as three marque fleets of privateers. It was probably one of Lochinvar's marque fleets that was sent to support the English Royal Navy in defending Irish waters in 1626. The manufacture and design of naval guns was improved by John Browne in 1625. In 1627, the Royal Scots Navy and accompanying contingents of burgh privateers participated in the major expedition to Biscay. The Scots also returned to the West Indies, with Lochinvar taking French prizes and founding the colony of Charles Island on Floreana in the Galapagos Islands off Ecuador. In 1629, two squadrons of privateers led by Lochinvar and William Lord Alexander, sailed for Canada, taking part in the campaign that resulted in the capture of Quebec from the French, which was handed back after the subsequent peace.

Charles I levied "ship money" from 1634 and this unpopular tax was one of the main causes of the first English Civil War from 1642 to 1645. At the beginning of the war the navy, then consisting of 35 vessels, sided with Parliament. During the war the royalist side used a number of small ships to blockade ports and for supplying their own armies. These were afterwards combined into a single force. Charles had surrendered to the Scots and conspired with them to invade England during the second English Civil War of 1648–51. In 1648 part of the Parliamentary fleet mutinied and joined the Royalist side. However, the Royalist fleet was driven to Spain and destroyed during the Commonwealth period by Robert Blake.

=== Commonwealth (1649–1660) ===
The Interregnum saw a considerable expansion in the strength of the navy, both in number of ships and in internal importance within English policy. The execution of Charles I forced the rapid expansion of the navy, by multiplying England's actual and potential enemies, and many vessels were constructed from the 1650s onward under a reformed institution. The Commonwealth of England (as a republic), officially removed or changed most names and symbols (including heraldry) associated with royalty and/or the high church. This affected the Commonwealth Navy. As early as 1646, vessels were renamed, including Liberty (ex-Charles), Resolution (ex-Royal Prince), and George (ex-St George); new vessels were often given names associated with institutions or individual officials, including President, Speaker, Fairfax (after Thomas Fairfax), Monck (George Monck) and Richard (Richard Cromwell), or Parliamentary victories in the civil war, such as Worcester, Bristol, Gainsborough, Preston, Langport, Newbury, Martson Moor, Nantwich, Colchester, and Naseby. (The prefix "English ship" has normally been used of naval vessels before the late 17th century; "His Majesty's Ship" was not official usage at the time.) The new regime, isolated and threatened from all sides, dramatically expanded the Commonwealth Navy, which became the most powerful in the world.

The Commonwealth's introduction of Navigation Acts, providing that all merchant shipping to and from England or her colonies should be carried out by English ships, led to war with the Dutch Republic. In the early stages of this First Anglo-Dutch War (1652–1654), the superiority of the large, heavily armed English ships was offset by superior Dutch tactical organisation and the fighting was inconclusive. English tactical improvements resulted in a series of crushing victories in 1653 at Portland, the Gabbard and Scheveningen, bringing peace on favourable terms. This was the first war fought largely, on the English side, by purpose-built, state-owned warships. It was followed by a war with Spain, which saw the English conquest of Jamaica in 1655 and successful attacks on Spanish treasure fleets in 1656 and 1657, but also the devastation of English merchant shipping by the privateers of Dunkirk, until their home port was captured by Anglo-French forces in 1658.

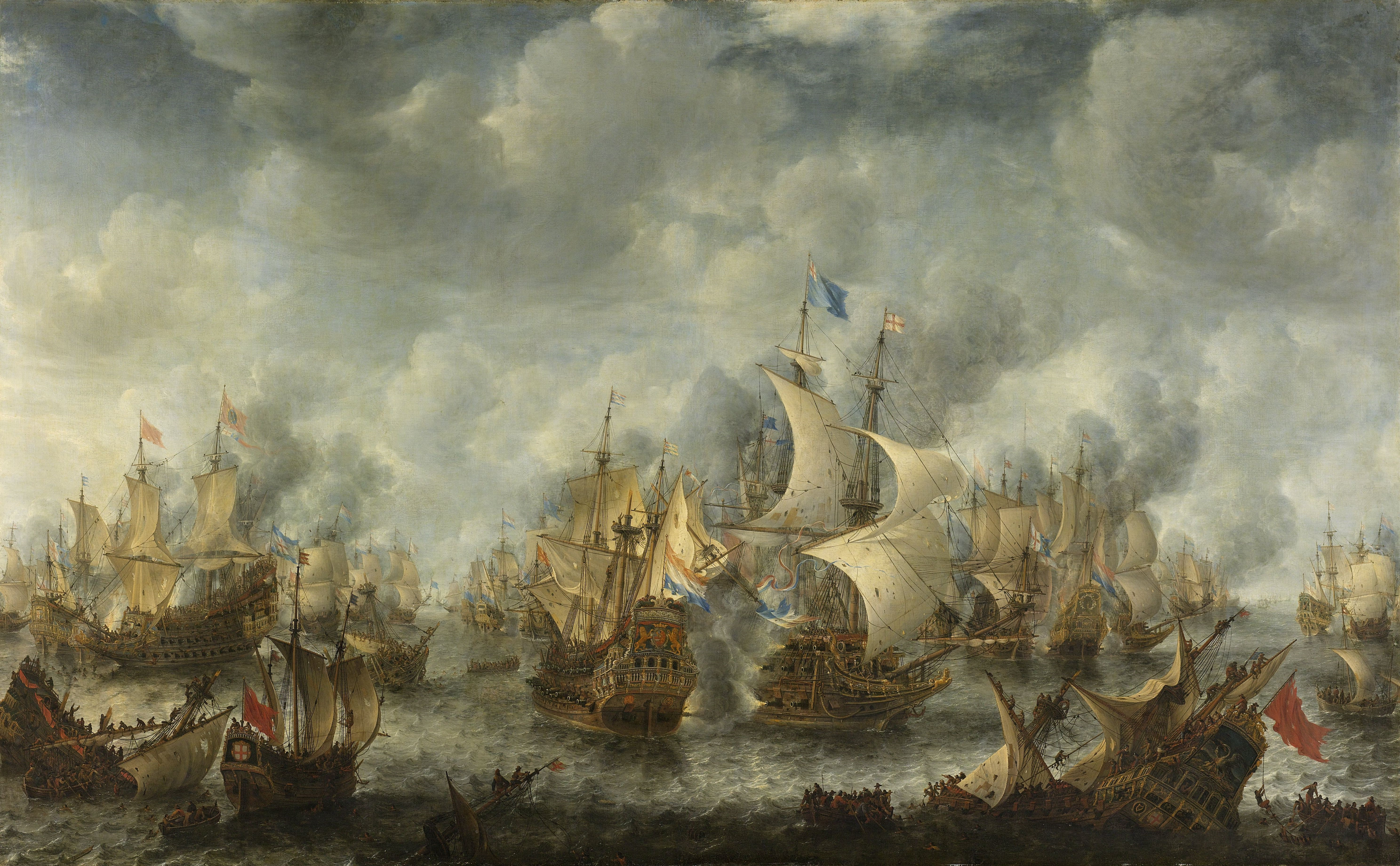
The Battle of Scheveningen, 10 August 1653

=== Restoration (1660–1688) ===
The Restoration of the English, Scottish, and Irish monarchies occurred in May 1660, and Charles II assumed the throne. The Restoration Monarchy inherited this large navy and continued the same policy of expansion, focusing on large ships in order to provide a strong defence under Charles II. At the start of the Restoration, Parliament listed forty ships of the Royal Navy (not of the Summer's Guard) with a complement of 3,695 sailors. One of his first acts was to officially name the Royal Navy, The prefix HMS was also officially attached to its vessels for the first time. Nevertheless, the navy remained a national institution, rather than the personal possession of the reigning monarch, as it had been before the civil war. The administration of the navy was greatly improved by Sir William Coventry and Samuel Pepys, both of whom began their service in 1660 with the Restoration. While it was Pepys's diary that made him the most famous of all naval bureaucrats, his nearly thirty years of administration were crucial in replacing the ad hoc processes of years past with regular programmes of supply, construction, pay, and so forth. He was responsible for introduction of the "Navy List" which fixed the order of promotion.

In 1664 the English captured New Amsterdam (later New York City) resulting in the Second Dutch War (1665–1667). In 1666 the Four Days Battle was a defeat for the English but the Dutch fleet was crushed a month later off Orfordness. In 1667 the Dutch mounted the Raid on the Medway, breaking into Chatham Dockyard and capturing or burning many of the Navy's largest ships at their moorings. The English were also defeated at Solebay in 1672. The experience of large-scale battle was instructive to the Navy; the Articles of War regularising the conduct of officers and seaman, and the "Fighting Instructions" establishing the line of battle, both date from this period. The influence and reforms of Samuel Pepys, the Chief Secretary to the Admiralty under both King Charles II and subsequently King James II, were important in the early professionalisation of the Royal Navy.

As a result of their defeat in the First Anglo-Dutch War, the Dutch transformed their navy, largely abandoning the use of militarised merchantmen and establishing a fleet composed mainly of heavily armed, purpose-built warships, as the English had done previously. Consequently, the Second Anglo-Dutch War (1665–1667) was a closely fought struggle between evenly matched opponents, with English victory at Lowestoft (1665) countered by Dutch triumph in the epic Four Days' Battle (1666). The deadlock was broken not by combat but by the superiority of Dutch public finance, as in 1667 Charles II was forced to lay up the fleet in port for lack of money to keep it at sea while negotiating for peace. Disaster followed as the Dutch fleet mounted the Raid on the Medway, breaking into Chatham Dockyard and capturing or burning many of the Navy's largest ships at their moorings. In the Third Anglo-Dutch War (1672–1674), Charles II allied with Louis XIV of France against the Dutch, but the combined Anglo-French fleet was fought to a standstill in a series of inconclusive battles, while the French invasion by land was warded off.

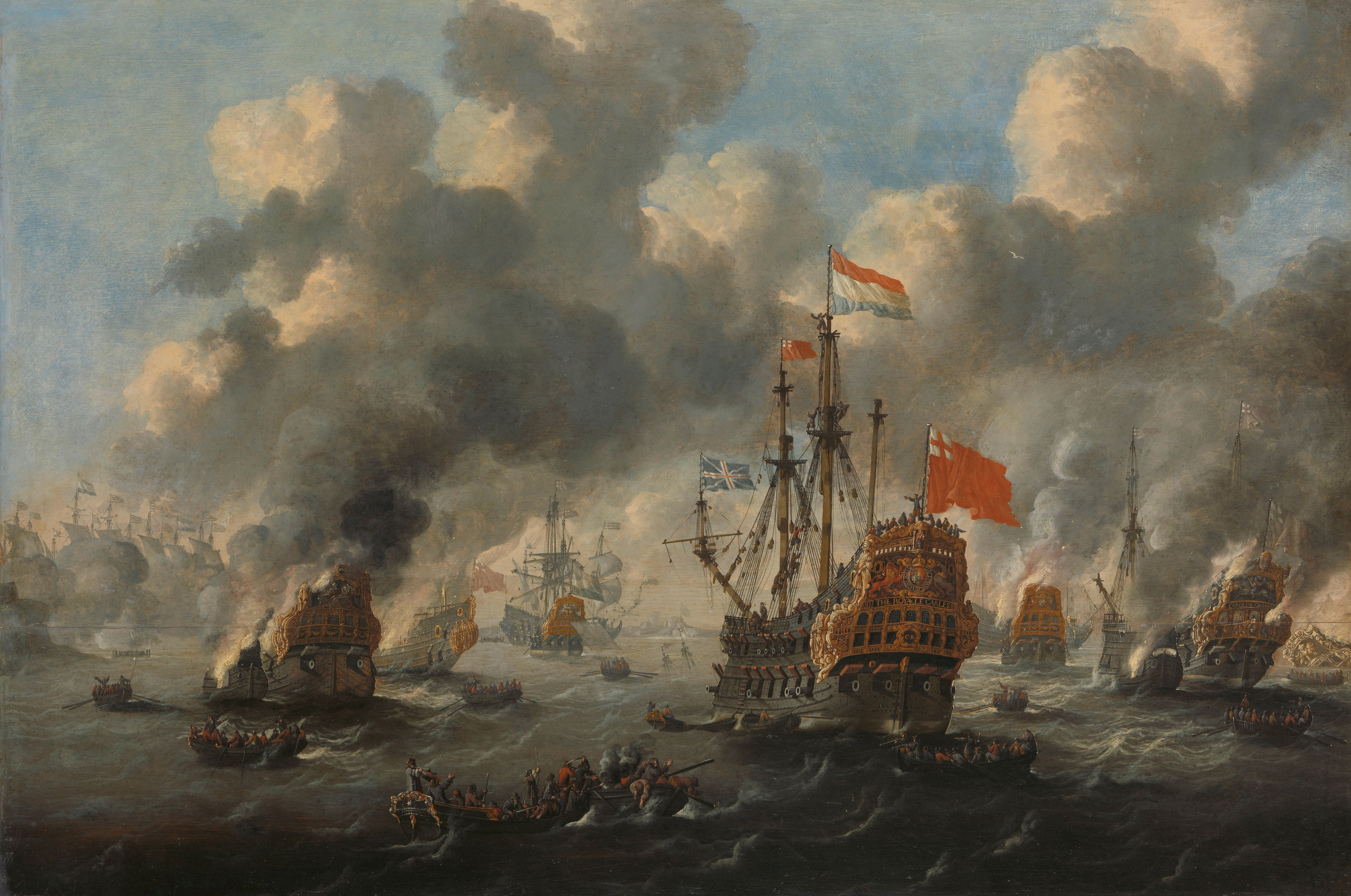
The Dutch Raid on the Medway in 1667 during the Second Anglo-Dutch War

During the 1670s and 1680s, the English Royal Navy succeeded in permanently ending the threat to English shipping from the Barbary corsairs, inflicting defeats which induced the Barbary states to conclude long-lasting peace treaties. Following the Glorious Revolution of 1688, England joined the European coalition against Louis XIV in the War of the Grand Alliance (1688–1697). Louis' recent shipbuilding programme had given France the largest navy in Europe. A combined Anglo-Dutch fleet was defeated at Beachy Head (1690), but victory at Barfleur-La Hogue (1692) was a turning-point, marking the end of France's brief pre-eminence at sea and the beginning of an enduring English, later British, supremacy. In 1683 the "Victualling Board" was set up which fixed the ration scales. In 1655 Blake routed the Barbary pirates and started a campaign against the Spanish in the Caribbean, capturing Jamaica.

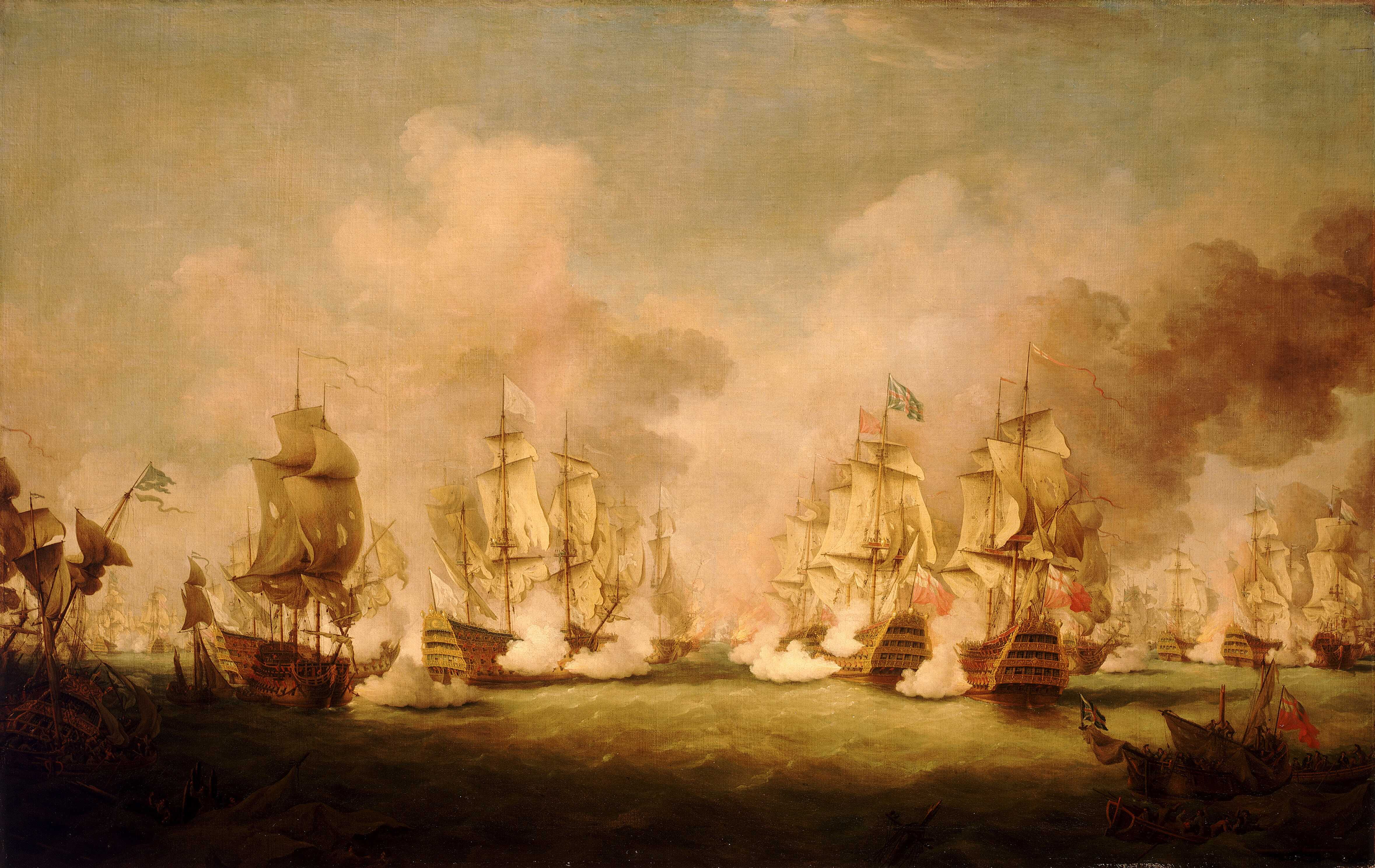
The Battle of Barfleur in 1692

=== Glorious Revolution 1688–1707 ===
The Glorious Revolution of 1688 rearranged the political map of Europe, and led to a series of wars with France that lasted well over a century. This was the classic Age of Sail; while the ships themselves evolved in only minor ways, technique and tactics were honed to a high degree, and the battles of the Napoleonic Wars entailed feats that would have been impossible for the fleets of the 17th century. Because of parliamentary opposition, James II fled the country. The landing of William III and the Glorious Revolution itself was a gigantic effort involving 100 warships and 400 transports carrying 11,000 infantry and 4,000 horses. The English or Scottish fleets failed to intecept the Dutch invasion fleet and Louis XIV declared war on the Dutch just days later, a conflict which became known as the War of the Grand Alliance. The English defeat at the Battle of Beachy Head of 1690 led to an improved version of the Fighting Instructions, and subsequent operations against French ports proved more successful, leading to decisive victory at La Hougue in 1692.

By 1697 the English Royal Navy had 323 warships, while Scotland was still dependent on merchantman and privateers. In the 1690s, two separate schemes for larger naval forces were put in motion. As usual, the larger part was played by the merchant community rather than the government. The first was the Darien Scheme to found a Scottish colony in Spanish controlled America. It was undertaken by the Company of Scotland, who created a fleet of five ships, including Caledonia and St Andrew, all built or chartered in Holland and Hamburg. It sailed to the Isthmus of Darien in 1698, but the venture failed and only one ship returned to Scotland. In the same period, it was decided to establish a professional navy for the protection of commerce in home waters during the Nine Years' War (1688–1697) with France, with three purpose-built warships bought from English shipbuilders in 1696. These were Royal William, a 32-gun fifth rate and two smaller ships, Royal Mary and Dumbarton Castle, each of 24 guns, generally described as frigates.

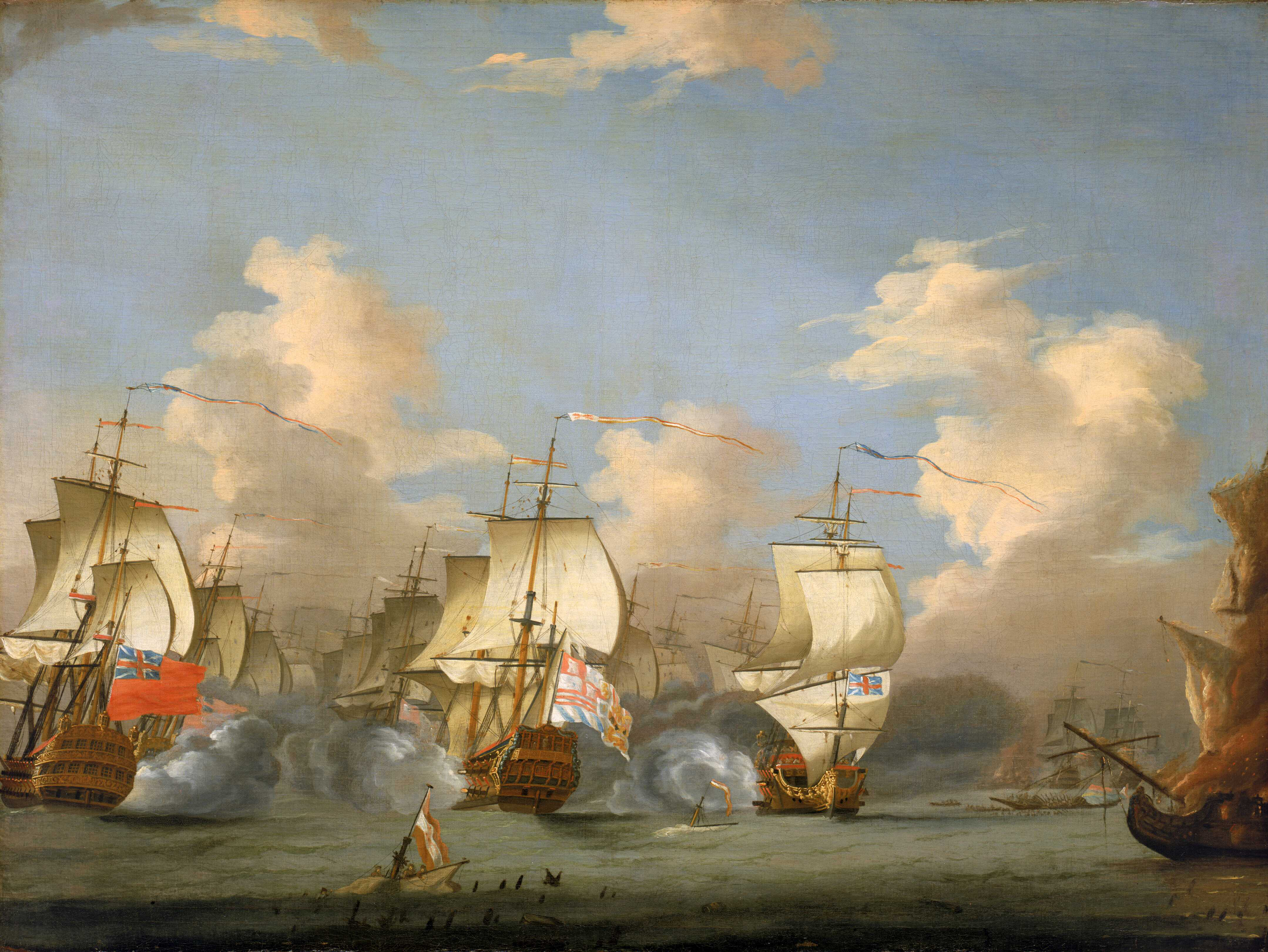
The Battle of Cape Passaro, 11 August 1718

Naval operations in the War of the Spanish Succession (1702–13) were with the Dutch against the Spanish and French. They were at first focused on the acquisition of a Mediterranean base, culminating in an alliance with Portugal and the 1704 capture of Gibraltar.

== Major battles of the English/Royal Navy ==
- 1213 Battle of Damme
- 1337 Battle of Cadzand
- 1338 Battle of Arnemuiden
- 1340 Battle of Sluys
- 1342 Battle of Brest
- 1350 Battle of Winchelsea
- 1372 Battle of La Rochelle
- 1387 Battle of Margate
- 1512 Battle of Saint-Mathieu
- 1545 Battle of the Solent
- 1585–1604 Anglo–Spanish War (1585)
- 1625 Cádiz Expedition (1625)
- 1627–1629 Anglo-French War (1627–1629)
- 1652–1654 First Anglo–Dutch War
- 1654–1660 Anglo-Spanish War (1654)
- 1665–1667 Second Anglo-Dutch War
- 1672–1674 Third Anglo-Dutch War
- 1688–1697 Nine Years' War
- 1701–1713 War of the Spanish Succession

== See also ==
- Articles of War (Royal Navy) superseded by the Armed Forces Act 2006
- History of the Royal Marines
- History of the Royal Naval Reserve
- List of ships and sailors of the Royal Navy
- Maritime history of the United Kingdom
- Naval history
