= English ship Constant Reformation =

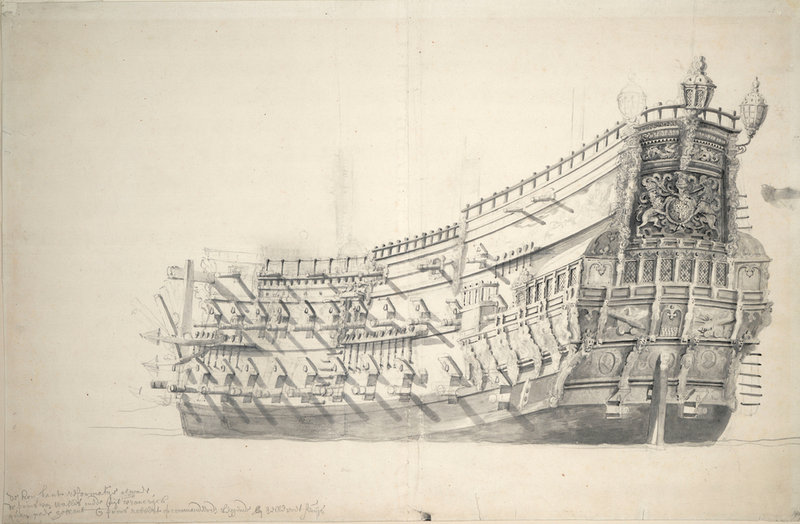
- English ship Constant Reformation (1619)

History

England
- Name: Constant Reformation
- Ordered: 20 April 1619
- Builder: William Burrell, Deptford Dockyard
- Launched: 1619
- Fate: Ran aground and wrecked on 30 September 1651, near Terceira Island in the Azores

General characteristics
- Class & type: 42-gun Great ship (or Second rate)
- Tons burthen: 71053/94 bm (nominally 742 tons)
- Length: 106 ft (32 m) (keel)
- Beam: 35 ft 6 in (10.82 m)
- Depth of hold: 15 ft (4.6 m)
- Sail plan: Full-rigged ship
- Armament: 42 guns of various weights of shot

Constant Reformation was a 42-gun great ship or Second rate of the English navy, built by William Burrell (Master Shipwright of the East India Company) at Deptford Dockyard and launched in 1619.

== Design and modification ==
The Constant Reformation was the first of the six "Great Ships" (or Second rates) to be designed and built at Deptford Dockyard for James I's navy by Burrell (as well as three Third rates and a Fourth rate). The other Second Rates were the Victory, Swiftsure, Saint Andrew, Saint George and Triumph. These ten vessels were all part of the fleet modernisation programme instituted by the 1618 Jacobean Commission of Enquiry. The first three ships were designed with a keel length of 103 ft and a beam of 34 ft, intended to be of 650 tons each, but the Constant Reformation as completed measured 106 ft on the keel and had a breadth of 35 ft 6 in. Her nominal tonnage was 742 "tons and tonnage", while her burthen tonnage was 71053/94 bm.

Like the other five, the Constant Reformation was built as a two-decked ship with 42 guns (although only 38 of these were carriage guns, the other four being swivel-mounted on the superstructure), but during Charles I's reign a spar deck was added over the upper deck, and later this was hardened to support a third gundeck, although there were no guns mounted in the middle part of this deck (with three pairs of gunports forward and four pairs aft of this unarmed section). There was no forecastle over this third deck. By 1651 she carried about 56 guns. Her original complement of 280 men rose to at least 300 by 1651.

== Career and Fate ==
The Constant Reformation first saw action in the English expedition to Algiers (1620–1621), then in the unsuccessful Cádiz expedition (1625), part of the Anglo-Spanish War (1625–1630).

In the First English Civil War from 1642 to 1646, Constant Reformation was the flagship of the Parliamentarian deputy commander, Vice-Admiral William Batten, before being taken over by Thomas Rainsborough when he was appointed commander in January 1648. His crew mutinied in May 1648 and with Batten acting as captain, the Constant Reformation was one of the ships that defected to the Royalists during the Second English Civil War in August 1648. Late in 1648 the ship, and wider Royalist fleet, came under the direct control of Prince Rupert of the Rhine who took the ship to Lisbon then along the south coast of Spain. While acting as a Royalist privateer, it ran aground near Terceira Island in the Azores and was lost on 30 September 1651, with some 300 men drowned.

== Sources ==
- Lavery, Brian (1983) The Ship of the Line – Volume 1: The development of the battlefleet 1650-1850. Conway Maritime Press. ISBN 0-85177-252-8.
- Winfield, Rif (2009) British Warships in the Age of Sail 1603-1714: Design, Construction, Careers and Fates. Seaforth Publishing. ISBN 978-1-84832-040-6.
