= English expedition to Algiers (1620–1621) =

1620–1621 military expedition

- Part of Corsair War (1620–1621)
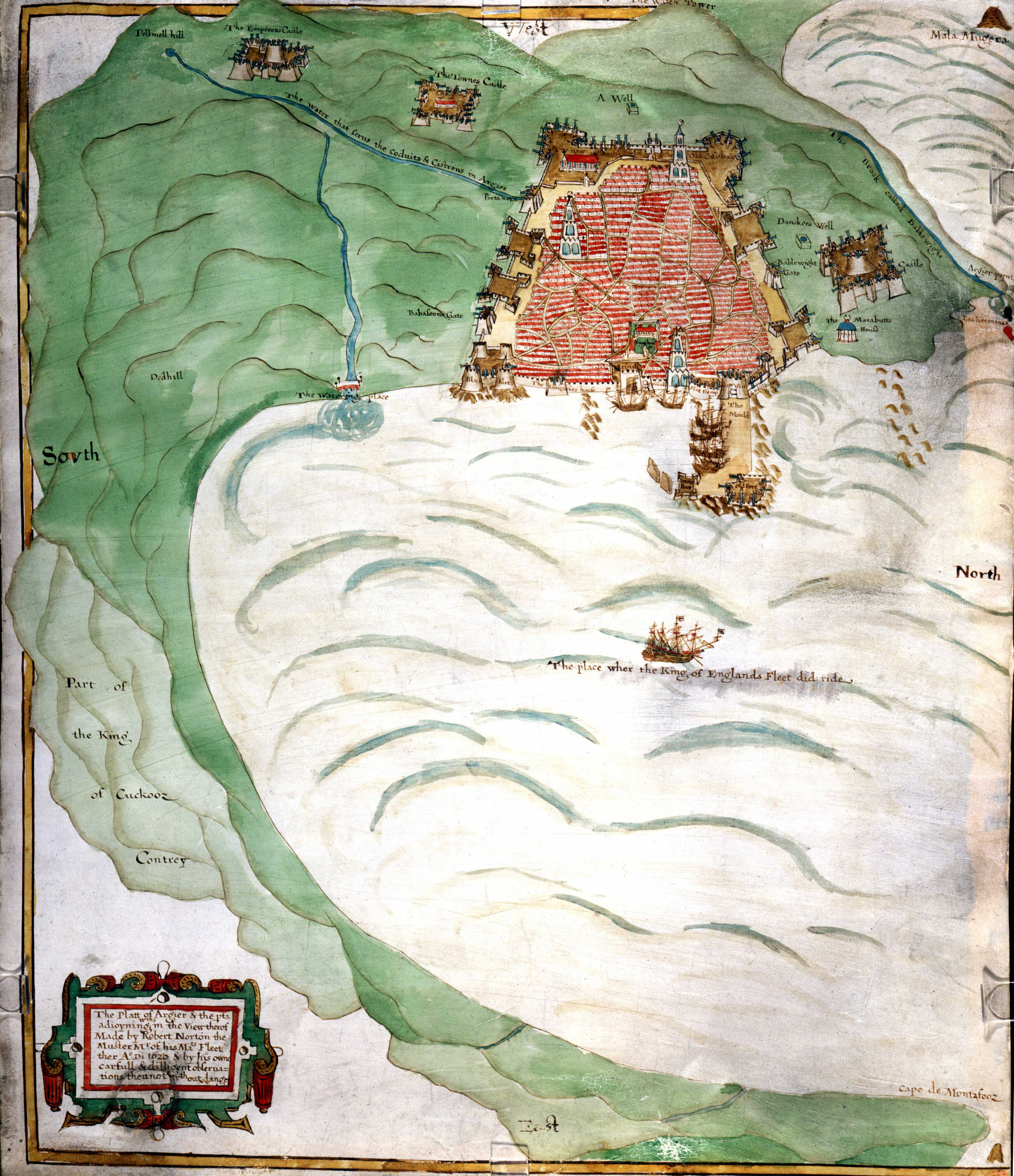
- Depiction of Algiers in 1620
Date	1620–1621
Location	Algiers
Result	Algerian victory

Belligerents
England	Algiers

Commanders and leaders
Mansell	Kassan Kaid Kussa

Strength
20 ships	Unknown

Casualties and losses
Unknown	Unknown

The English expedition to Algiers occurred between 1620 and 1621, it was a naval attack ordered by King James with the goal of ending Muslim piracy.

== Background ==
With the accession of James I (1603–1625) to power in England, Anglo-Algerian relations moved from peaceful diplomacy to maritime hostilities. An "opponent of Islam", he damaged relations with the Regency of Algiers by issuing privateering licenses to his subjects, enabling them to attack ships of the Barbary states. Although the English government had recalled privateering licenses in 1595 due to English privateers committing infractions and being prosecuted and sentenced in admiralty courts, they still had "a freer command over the Mediterranean, where Turkish and Algerian ships were seen as rightful prizes." In 1620, an English fleet under the command of Robert Mansell, supported by Richard Hawkins and Thomas Button, was sent to Algiers to put an end to the grips of the Barbary pirates on the trade route passing through the Strait of Gibraltar. After obtaining the release of 40 captives, following negotiations, in November 1620, Mansell took part in a second expedition in 1621.

== History ==
=== Expedition ===
On 27 November in the year 1620, Mansell arrived at Algiers with 20 ships and formally demanded that the Dey of Algiers surrender all of the English subjects and vessels they had. He also demanded the execution or capture of all of the pirates who had captured them. The Algerians pretended to show eagerness to comply with his demands and released some four-and-twenty captives. Mansell was aware that this was a small amount since the Algerians had captured 150 English vessels in the past six years, however he was not prepared to fight and sailed away.

On 21 May, he returned to Algiers and three days later launched his attack. The English launched several fire ships against the pirate ships, with flames being seen shooting up in no less than seven places amongst their rigging. The English were low on ammunition and the Algerians took advantage of this, eventually driving off Mansell's fleet.

== Aftermath ==
The expedition prompted a violent response by the Algerian pirates: they not only raided merchant ships in the Mediterranean, but extended their piracy to the British mainland along the English Channel. Years of privateering did England more damage than Algiers. James I furthered a treaty through the Sublime Porte, where he negotiated directly in Constantinople in 1622 with the Pasha of Algiers, who happened to be visiting there.

== English ships ==
Ship	Guns	Commander	Notes	Ref.
Lion	40	Admiral Sir Robert Mansell		
Vanguard	40	Vice-Admiral Sir Richard Hawkins		
Rainbow	40	Rear-Admiral Sir Thomas Button		
Constant Reformation	40	Captain Arthur Manwaring		
Antelope	34	Captain Sir Henry Palmer		
Convertine	36	Captain Thomas Love		
Mercury	20		Joined 26 February 1621	
Spy	18		Joined 26 February 1621	
Golden Phoenix	24		Hired merchant ship	
Samuel	22		Hired merchant ship	
Marygold	21		Hired merchant ship	
Zouche Phoenix	26		Hired merchant ship	
Barbary	18		Hired merchant ship	
Centurion	22		Hired merchant ship	
Primrose	18		Hired merchant ship	
Hercules	24		Hired merchant ship	
Neptune	21		Hired merchant ship	
Bonaventure	23		Hired merchant ship	
Restore	12		Hired merchant ship	
Marmaduke	12		Hired merchant ship	
