= List of ships and sailors of the Royal Navy =

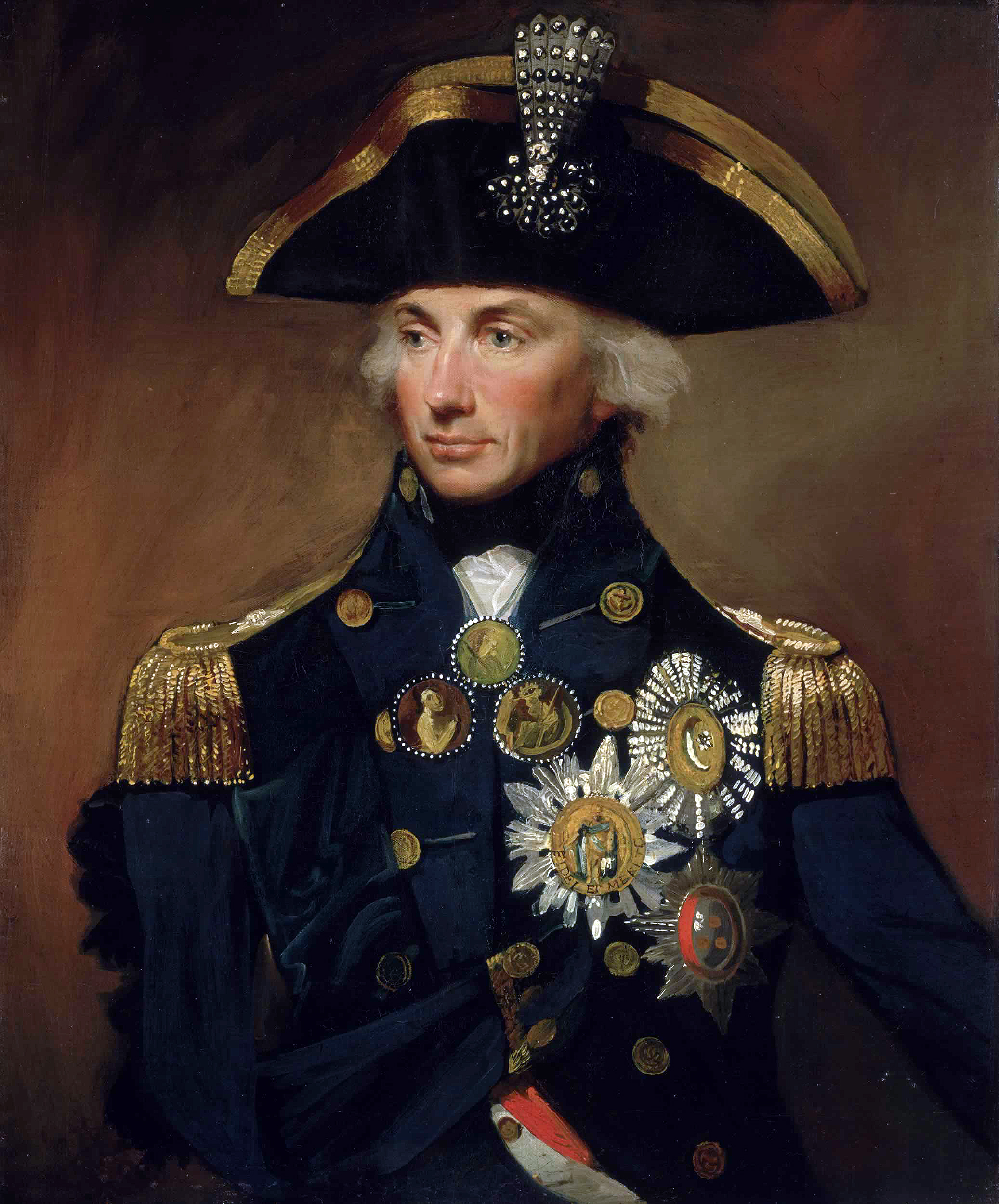
Portrait of Sir Horatio Nelson

This page is a list of famous ships and sailors of the Royal Navy. The list is composed of famous sailors of the Royal Navy e.g. Horatio Nelson. The list also includes people who are famous and have served with the Royal Navy at some point e.g. Alec Guinness. This list also includes ships that have become famous in their own right, e.g. Mary Rose.

== Notable ships ==
- Mary Rose: sank in 1545 off Portsmouth, in the Battle of the Solent.
- Golden Hind: flagship of Sir Francis Drake's circumnavigation and raid on Spanish shipping.
- Ark Royal: flagship of English Fleet against the Spanish Armada. The last Ark Royal was an Invincible-class aircraft carrier that saw action in the 2003 Iraq conflict.
- Revenge: actively engaged Spanish Armada; later became the subject of a poem by Lord Tennyson detailing her heroic fight against a large Spanish force in 1591.
- Endeavour: Royal Navy research vessel commanded by Lieutenant James Cook on his first voyage of discovery.
- Bounty: scene of the famous mutiny.
- Victory: Nelson's flagship. This ship is still officially in service and is the world's oldest commissioned warship and the flagship of the First Sea Lord.
- Beagle: carried Charles Darwin on his voyage.
- Warrior: Britain's first iron hulled, armoured battleship.
- Dreadnought: first "all big-gun" battleship.
- Warspite: fought at Jutland and through the Second World War.
- Hood: battlecruiser destroyed by the Bismarck.
- Vanguard: last battleship built for the Royal Navy & also ran aground in Portsmouth Harbour.
- Dreadnought: first British nuclear-powered submarine.
- Resolution: first British strategic ballistic missile submarine.
- Invincible: light aircraft carrier.
- Intrepid: end of the Falklands War signed aboard.
- Conqueror: The first nuclear-powered submarine to sink an enemy ship.

== Notable sailors ==
In approximate chronological order.

- Sir Humphrey Gilbert
- Sir Martin Frobisher
- Sir Francis Drake
- Robert Blake
- George Monck, 1st Duke of Albemarle
- James, Duke of York (later James II)
- William Penn
- Edward Montagu, 1st Earl of Sandwich
- George Anson, 1st Baron Anson
- Edward Hawke, 1st Baron Hawke
- John Benbow
- Edward Boscawen
- George Rodney, 1st Baron Rodney
- Richard Howe, 1st Earl Howe
- Samuel Barrington
- Samuel Hood, 1st Viscount Hood
- Richard Kempenfelt
- John Jervis, 1st Earl of St Vincent
- James Cook
- Erasmus Gower
- James Saumarez, 1st Baron de Saumarez
- Edward Pellew, 1st Viscount Exmouth
- Horatio Nelson, 1st Viscount Nelson
- The Prince William (later William IV)
- Sir Thomas Hardy, 1st Baronet
- Sir George Cockburn, 10th Baronet
- Cuthbert Collingwood, 1st Baron Collingwood
- Admiral Sir James Stirling
- Sir Sidney Smith
- Thomas Cochrane, 10th Earl of Dundonald
- Sir James Vashon
- George Vancouver
- William Bligh
- Sir John Franklin
- Charles Robert Malden
- Jackie Fisher, 1st Baron Fisher
- Robert Falcon Scott
- John Jellicoe, 1st Earl Jellicoe
- David Beatty, 1st Earl Beatty
- William Boyle, 12th Earl of Cork
- Andrew Cunningham, 1st Viscount Cunningham of Hyndhope
- James Somerville
- Bertram Ramsay
- Max Horton
- Philip Vian
- Prince Albert of York (later George VI) served as midshipman during World War I.
- Louis Mountbatten, 1st Earl Mountbatten of Burma
- Frederic John Walker
- Sir John "Sandy" Woodward

== Famous people ==
- Anthony Bate, English actor, possibly best known for his role as Oliver Lacon in the BBC television adaptations of the John le Carré novels Tinker, Tailor, Soldier, Spy and Smiley's People, served with the Royal Navy Volunteer Reserve in 1945–47.
- Peter Bull, English character actor, served as an RNVR lieutenant commander during World War II, awarded the DSC.
- James Callaghan, Prime Minister of the United Kingdom from 1976 to 1979, was conscripted in 1942 as an Ordinary Seaman, and was promoted to Lieutenant in April 1944.
- Sean Connery, actor, enlisted into the Royal Navy in 1946, and served as an anti-aircraft gunner before receiving a medical discharge in 1949.
- Harry H. Corbett, actor famous for Steptoe and Son, served in the Royal Marines during the latter part of World War II.
- Ian Fleming, author of the James Bond novels, served in the Naval Intelligence Division during World War II.
- William Golding, novelist and winner of the Nobel Prize for Literature, served as a lieutenant and was present (on board a destroyer) at the sinking of the Bismarck.
- John Gregson, actor, conscripted to serve on minesweepers in the Royal Navy during World War II. Used this experience playing the Captain of HMS Exeter, in the 1956 film The Battle of the River Plate.
- Alec Guinness, actor, served during World War II, initially as a rating, but later commissioned in 1941. He commanded a landing craft taking part in the invasion of Sicily and Elba and later ferried supplies to the Yugoslav partisans.
- Jack Gwillim, served in the Navy for 20 years rising to the rank of commander, but after being invalided out in 1946 he became a noted character actor.
- Michael Havers, Baron Havers, QC and Attorney General, served as a 19-year-old midshipman on Sirius in Force Q during World War II.
- Michael Hordern, actor, served on Illustrious in "Operation Ironclad" (the 1942 Battle of Madagascar) and later as a Lt.-Cdr in the office of the First Sea Lord.
- James Robertson Justice, joined the Royal Naval Volunteer Reserve, but after sustaining an injury in 1943 (thought to be shrapnel from a German shell), he was pensioned off.
- Sir Ludovic Kennedy, journalist, broadcaster and author served in the Royal Navy during World War II. His father commanded HMS Rawalpindi, the P&O armed merchant ship in her ill-fated encounter with the powerful German battleships Scharnhorst and Gneisenau in 1939.
- Laurence Olivier, actor, served in the Fleet Air Arm during World War II, rising to the rank of lieutenant.
- Peter O'Toole, actor, served as a radioman during his national service in 1950–52.
- Patrick Macnee, actor, served during World War II, with the rank of lieutenant.
- Nicholas Monsarrat, author, served as a RNVR lieutenant commander during World War II.
- Kenneth More actor, RNVR lieutenant, on board Aurora in Force Q during World War II.
- Prince Philip, Duke of Edinburgh served during and after World War II. He was mentioned in dispatches for his actions at the Battle of Cape Matapan and later commanded the frigate HMS Magpie. He gave up his naval career when his wife became Queen.
- Jon Pertwee, actor, best known for his portrayal of the Third Doctor in Doctor Who, served during World War II, as an radioman, and was transferred off the Hood just before it was sunk to become an officer, and served in the security division.
- Michael Redgrave, English stage and film actor, director, manager and author, served in Illustrious during World War II.
- Ralph Richardson, actor, served as a lieutenant commander during World War II.
- Nevil Shute, author and engineer, served as an RNVR lieutenant commander working on weapons development during World War II.
- Patrick Troughton, actor, best known for his portrayal of the Second Doctor in Doctor Who, served in Coastal Forces during World War II, rising to the rank of lieutenant, and commanding a motor gun boat.
- Godfrey Winn, a British journalist known as a columnist, and also a writer and actor. Trained at HMS Ganges. His book PQ17 was an account of his experiences on Convoy PQ 17 during the Second World War, serving in HMS Pozarica. See also 'Home from the Sea' published in 1944.

== See also ==
- Royal Navy
