= Winchelsea Court Hall =

Municipal building in Winchelsea, East Sussex, England

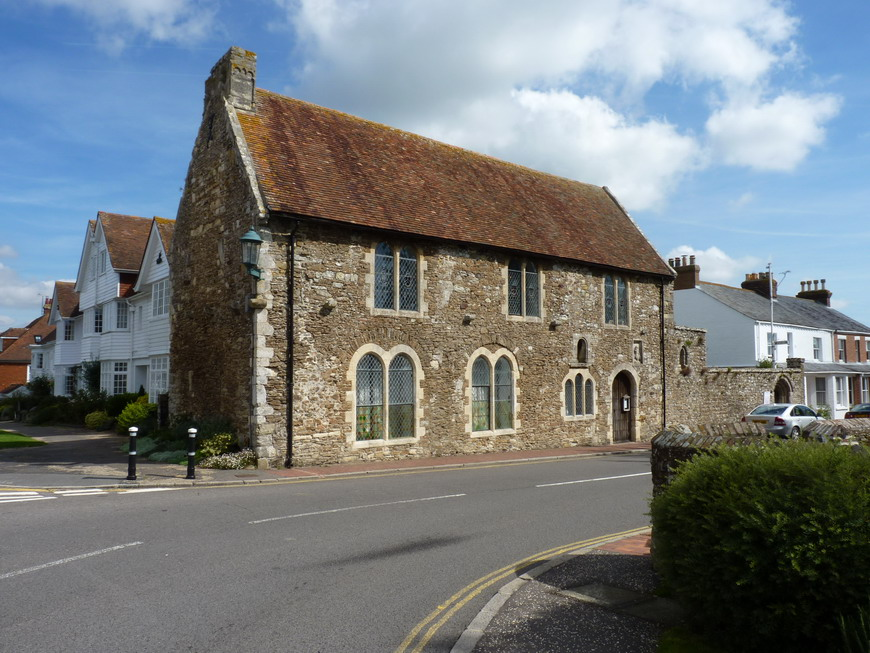
- Winchelsea Court Hall

- Shown in East Sussex
- 50.9248°N 0.7085°E
- Location: High Street, Winchelsea

History
- Built: c.1294

Site notes
- Architectural style: Medieval style

Listed Building – Grade I
- Official name: The Court Hall Town Museum
- Designated: 3 August 1961
- Reference no.: 1234513

Winchelsea Court Hall, formerly known as the Water Bailiff's Prison, is a municipal building in the High Street in Winchelsea, East Sussex, England. The structure, which is used as a museum, is a Grade I listed building.

== History ==
The first municipal building in Winchelsea was an ancient town hall in the Monday Market Square, just to the west of the Greyfriars Monastery, which was completed in the late 13th century.

The current building was commissioned as a private house for the Admiral of the Cinque Ports Fleet, Gervase Alard. It was designed in the medieval style, built in rubble masonry and was completed around the time that Alard became the first mayor of the town in 1294. The design involved an asymmetrical main frontage facing onto the High Street. The first two bays on the left on the ground floor and all three bays on the first floor were fenestrated by mullioned windows. The right-hand bay contained an arched doorway with voussoirs and, to the left of the doorway, there was a small tripartite window.

King Henry VII granted ownership of the building to Sir Edward Guildford following his appointment as bailiff of the town in 1506. The building was then held by subsequent bailiffs for the duration of their period in office. A lock-up for the incarceration of petty criminals was established on the ground floor, and a courtroom, which featured a crown post roof, was created on the first floor. The building was subsequently extended to the east, but that extension was demolished in 1666.

Winchelsea had a small electorate and a dominant patron, William Vane, 1st Duke of Cleveland, which meant it was recognised by the UK Parliament as a rotten borough. Its right to elect members of parliament was removed by the Reform Act 1832.

Despite objections from the local magistrates, the lock-up closed in 1879, and the ground floor was subsequently used as community event space. The borough council, which had met in the courtroom on the first floor, was abolished under the Municipal Corporations Act 1883. The actress, Dame Ellen Terry, established a stage school in the courtroom in the late 19th century.

== Museum ==
Since 1950, the courtroom has accommodated a small museum: one of the first accessions to the collection was a set of photographs of Winchelsea which were presented by Hastings Corporation. Subsequent accessions included artifacts associated with the Cinque Ports and archaeological specimens. Mayors of Winchelsea continue to be installed at a mayor-making ceremony which is held in the court hall on Easter Monday each year.

== See also ==
- Grade I listed buildings in East Sussex
- Winchelsea Court Hall Museum
