= L'Enfant du Régiment =

Painting by John Everett Millais

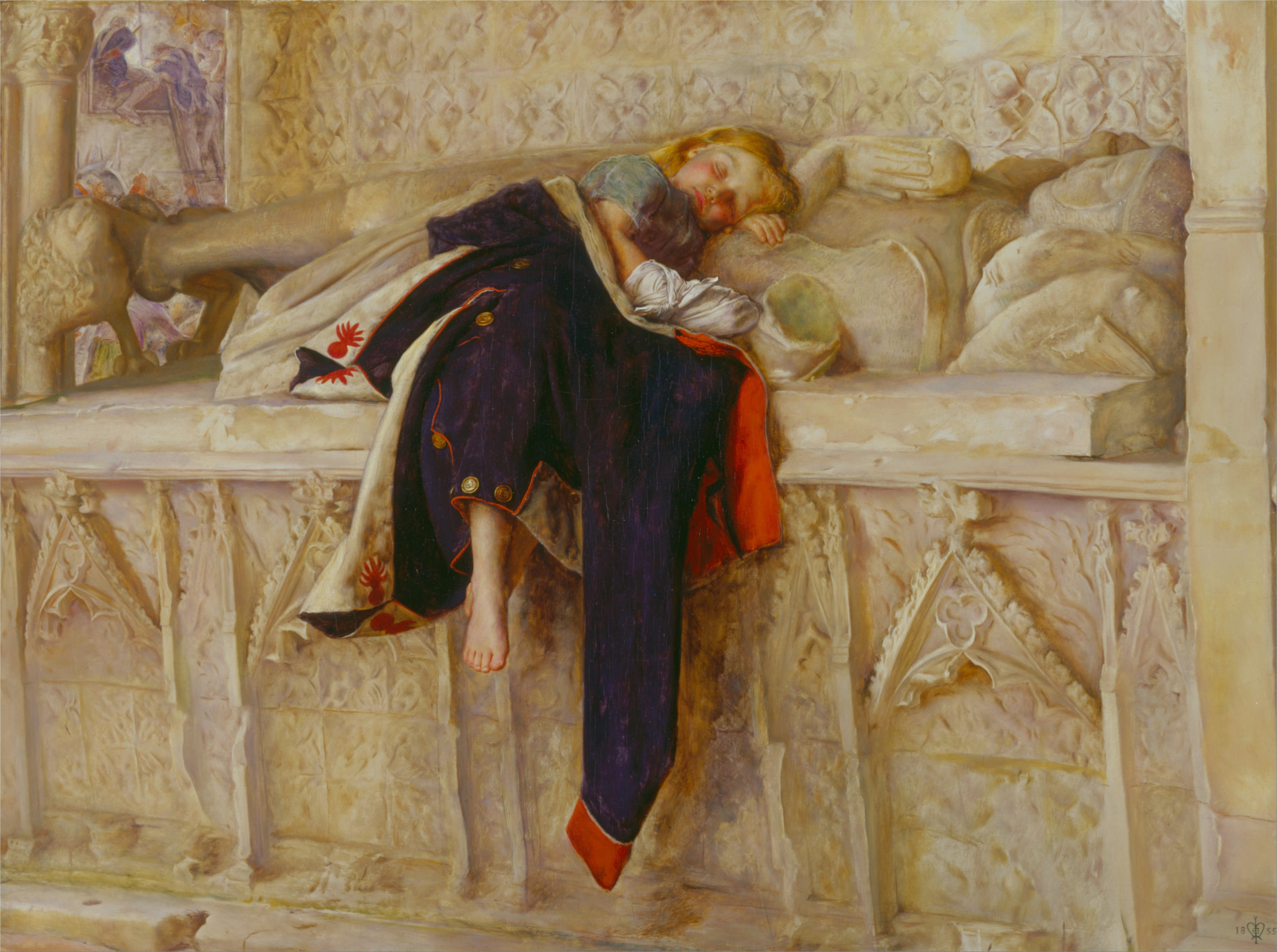
- Artist: John Everett Millais
- Year: 1854–55
- Type: Oil on paper, laid on canvas, mounted on board
- Dimensions: 45.1 cm × 61 cm (17.8 in × 24 in)
- Location: Yale Center for British Art, New Haven, Connecticut

L'Enfant du Régiment (The Child of the Regiment) or A Random Shot is an 1854–55 oil painting by the English artist John Everett Millais. In it, a young girl with a bandaged arm sleeps under a regimental jacket on the stone tomb of a medieval knight in a church, undisturbed by the soldiers in the background who are firing out of one of the windows.

== The painting ==
Millais based his painting on the 1840 popular opera La fille du régiment ("The Daughter of the Regiment") by Gaetano Donizetti. The young girl, Marie, is the daughter of an aristocratic Englishwoman, the Marchioness of Birkenfield, and a French officer fighting in the Napoleonic Wars. After her father's death, Marie is adopted by the officers of his regiment. She has been accidentally wounded during the fighting, and is sleeping on a tomb.

Millais painted the background of the church probably between 18 October and 22 November 1854, on-site in Winchelsea in East Sussex where he used the 14th-century tomb of Gervase Alard (1270–1340) in the church of St Thomas the Martyr as source material. The girl was added the following year, when Millais was in Perth in Scotland. It is thought that the model was Isabella Nicol, who also modelled for The Blind Girl and Autumn Leaves (both 1856).

The painting was first exhibited at Royal Academy Exhibition of 1856, under the title of L'Enfant du Régiment. It was also known as The Random Shot during Millais' lifetime, and the title is thought to have been inspired by the 1848 oil painting A Random Shot by the British artist Edwin Landseer.

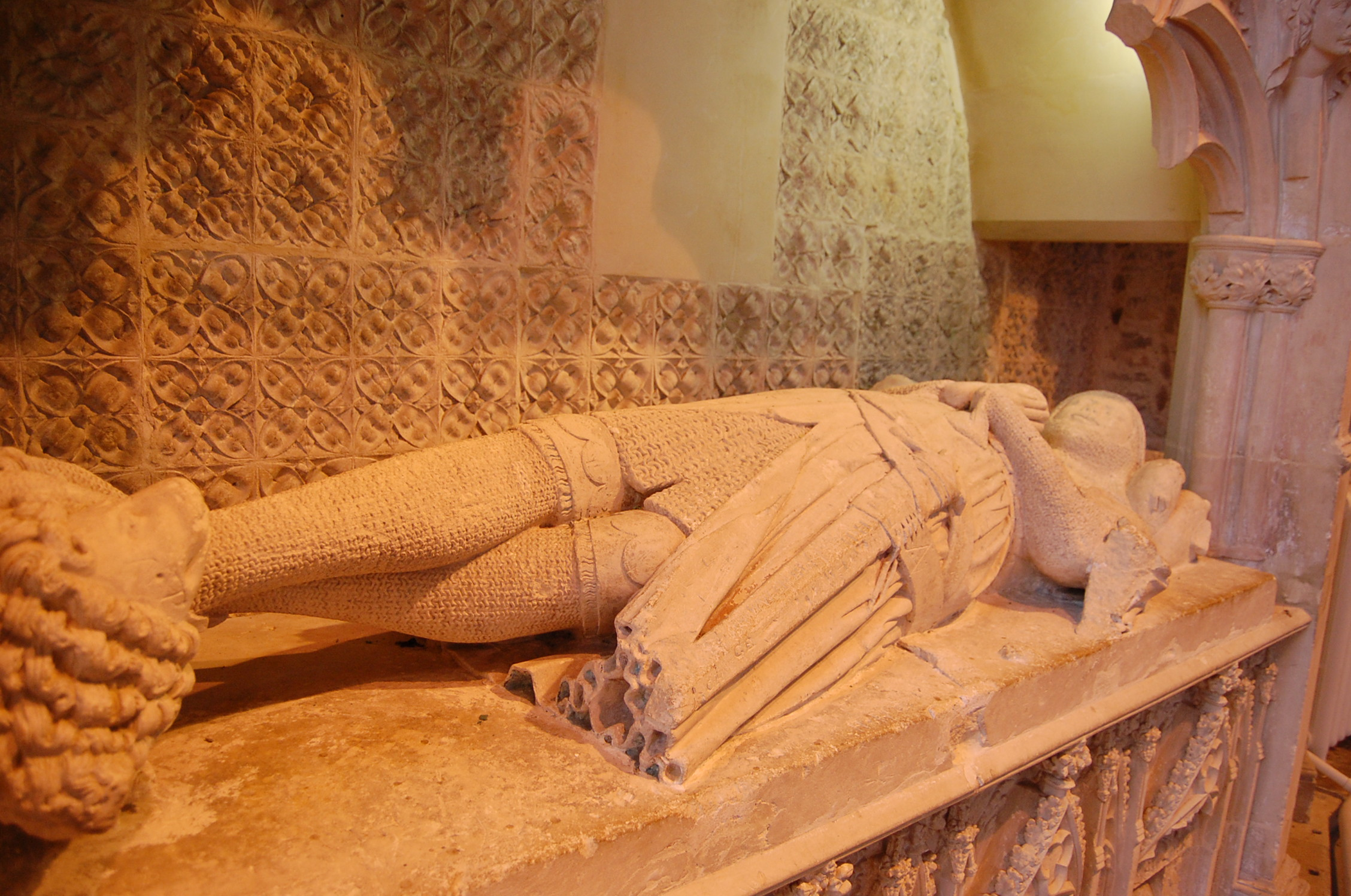
The tomb of Gervase Alard (1270–1340) in the church of St Thomas the Martyr in Winchelsea, East Sussex, used by Millais as a source for his painting L'Enfant du Régiment.

The painting was first sold to B. G. Windus. It featured in a special Winter Exhibition at the Royal Academy, London, held between January and March 1898, which featured many collected works of the late Millais. At the time it was the property of Thomas H. Miller, Esq., who had bought it from Windus before 30 April 1856.

The painting is now in the collection of Yale Center for British Art, New Haven, Connecticut, accession number B1981.4.

== See also ==
- List of paintings by John Everett Millais
