= Peter Bard =

English Knight and naval officer

Admiral Sir Peter Bard
- Born: England
- Died: England
- Military career
- Allegiance: Kingdom of England
- Branch: Navy Royal
- Service years: 1314-1339
- Rank: Admiral
- Units: Cinque Ports Fleet (1335-1336); Western Fleet (1338-1339)
- Commands: Admiral of the Cinque Port Fleet; Vice-Admiral of the West; Admiral of the West

Admiral Sir Peter Bard was an English Knight and naval officer who held a number of important commands of the Navy Royal from 1314 to 1336. and Admiral of the West from 1314 to 1315 and again from 1338 to 1339. Vice-Admiral of the West in 1337. and Admiral of the Fleet of the Cinque Ports from 1335 to 1336.

== Career ==
Bard was an important English naval commander in the first half of the 14th century. In 1314 was appointed Admiral of the West until 1315 and took part in King Edward II's campaign to Scotland in 1314 in a large ship La Beate Marie. From 1335 to 1336 he was appointed Admiral of the Cinque Port Fleet. In 1337 he was appointed Vice-Admiral of the West under Admiral of the West Bartholomew de Burghersh, 1st Baron Burghersh and assigned the duties of an under admiral. In 1338 he succeeded de Burghersh as Admiral of the West commanding the Western Fleet and the administration of the Western Admiralty until 1339. Prior to 1414 the English Navy was divided geographically into regional administrations until they were gradually absorbed into a single Admiralty Office covering all of England.

== Bibliography ==
- Cushway, Graham (2011). Edward III and the War at Sea: The English Navy, 1327-1377. Woodbridge, United Kingdom: Boydell Press. ISBN 9781843836216.
- Haydn, Joseph (1851). The Book of Dignities: Containing Lists of the Official Personages of the British Empire ... from the Earliest Periods to the Present Time ... Together with the Sovereigns and Rulers of Europe, from the Foundation of Their Respective States; the Peerage of England and Great Britain ... London: Longmans, Brown, Green and Longmans.
- Rodger, N.A.M. (2004). The safeguard of the sea : a naval history of Britain. 660 to 1649. New York: W.W. Norton. ISBN 9780140297249.
