= Gervase Alard =

English knight and naval commander

Sir Gervase Alard
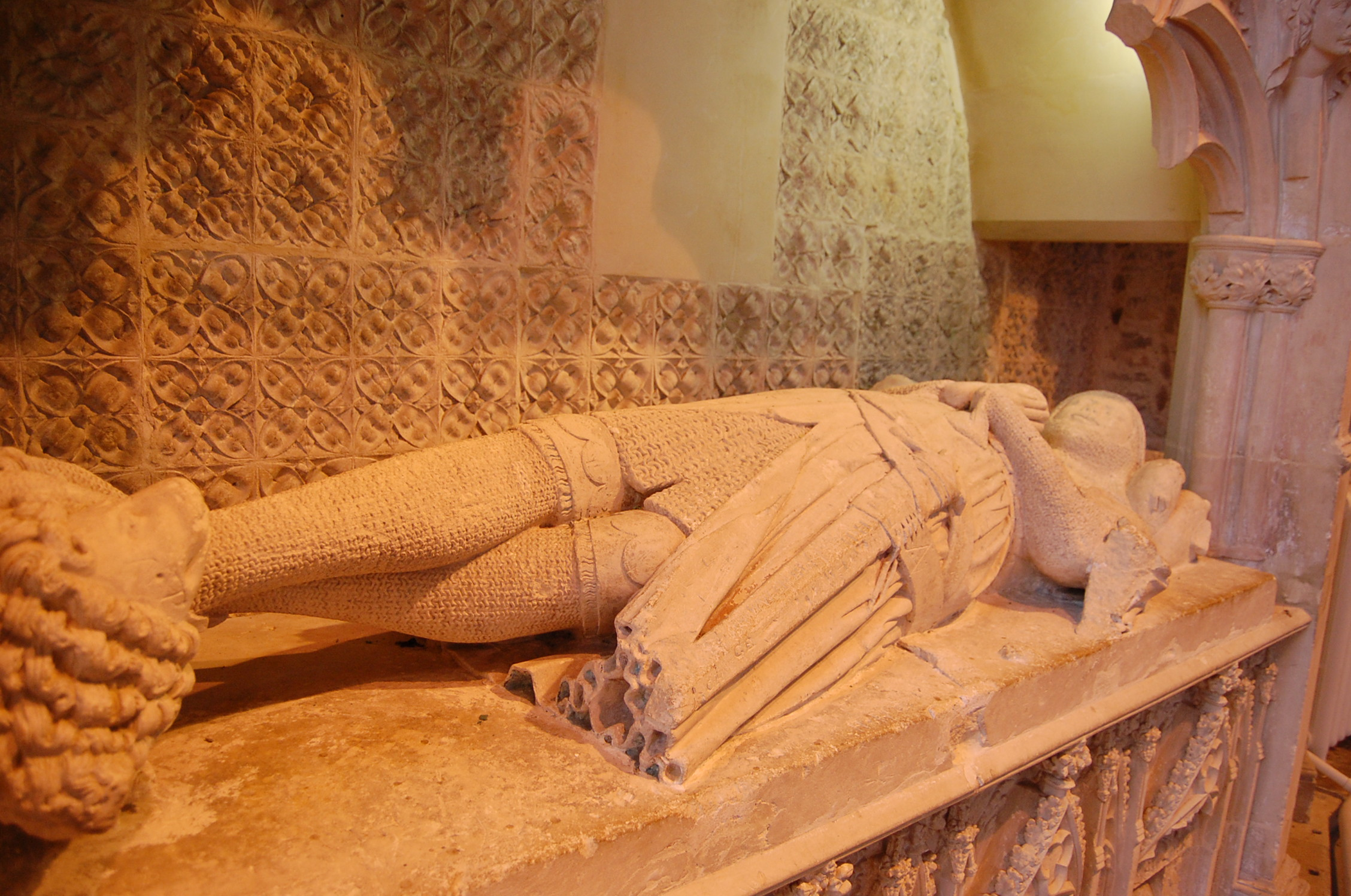
- The tomb of Gervase Alard (1270–1340) in the church of St Thomas the Martyr in Winchelsea, East Sussex
- Born: 1270; Winchelsea, East Sussex, England
- Died: 1340 (aged 69–70); Winchelsea, East Sussex, England
- Burial place: St. Thomas Church, Winchelsea, East Sussex, England
- Military career
- Allegiance: England
- Branch: Royal Navy
- Service years: 1296-1340
- Rank: Admiral
- Commands: Admiral of the Cinque Ports Fleet; Admiral of the Irish Sea; Admiral of the Western Fleet

Admiral Sir Gervase Alard, Bart. (1270–1340), was an English knight and naval commander who was appointed Admiral of the Cinque Ports Fleet and Admiral of the Western Fleet of the English Navy who served under King's Edward I, Edward II and Edward III of England from 1296 to 1340. He is known as the first serving naval officer to be granted a commission to the rank of Admiral of an English fleet in 1303.

== Naval career ==
Gervase Alard was born in Winchelsea, East Sussex, England in 1270 and came from a seafaring family and was deemed a master mariner he served as a knight of King Edward I. In 1294 he was appointed as the first Mayor of Winchelsea. His first service in the navy came when he took part in Edward I naval campaigns in Scotland from 1300 to 1306.

On 25 September 1300 Alard was first appointed as an Admiral of the Cinque Ports by Edward I of England confirmed by a royal writ that outlined the position as an administrative office until 3 February 1303. On 4 February 1303 he became the first serving English naval officer to be granted a royal commission to the rank of Admiral of an English Fleet and appointed Captain and Admiral of the Fleet of the Cinque Ports. He remained in command of the Cinque Ports fleet until 1304. Additionally he was also appointed Admiral of the Irish Sea in 1304 a post he held until 1305.

In July 1306, he was granted two further commissions, being appointed Admiral of the Western Fleet and reappointed Admiral of the Cinque Ports. He held both offices simultaneously until 1314.

== Family ==
Gervase Alard is thought to be the son of Thomas Alard when he was granted the town of New Winchelsea for life by the King in November 1306 in succession to him. In addition he was father to Stephen Alard, who later became Admiral of the Cinque Ports and the Western Fleet.

== In popular culture ==
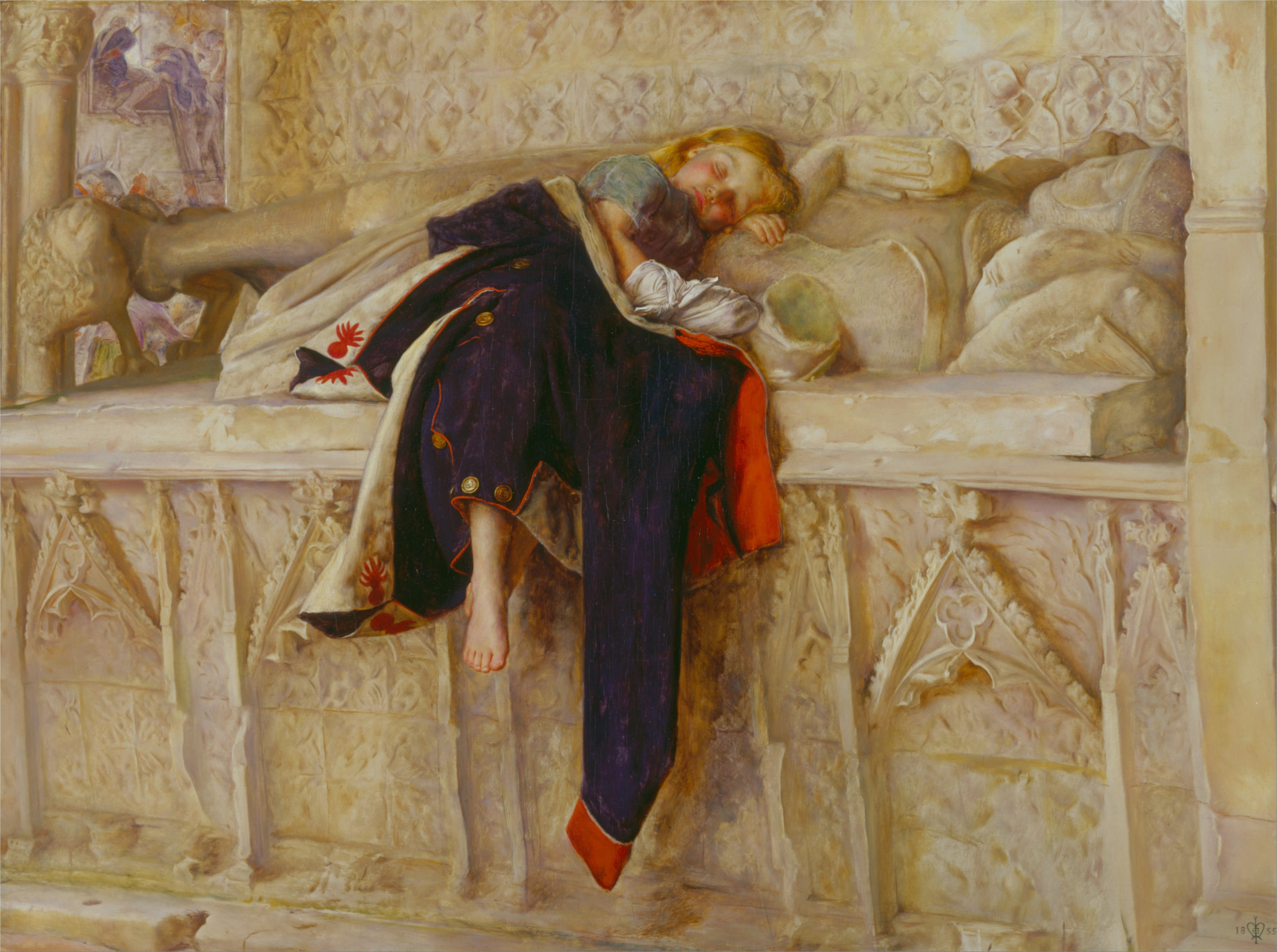
L'Enfant du Régiment by John Everett Millais, 1854–55. Yale Center for British Art, New Haven, Connecticut.

In 1854 English artist John Everett Millais used Alard's tomb in the church of St Thomas the Martyr in Winchelsea, East Sussex as the basis for his 1854–55 painting, L'Enfant du Régiment.
