= Winchelsea Court Hall Museum =

Museum in Winchelsea

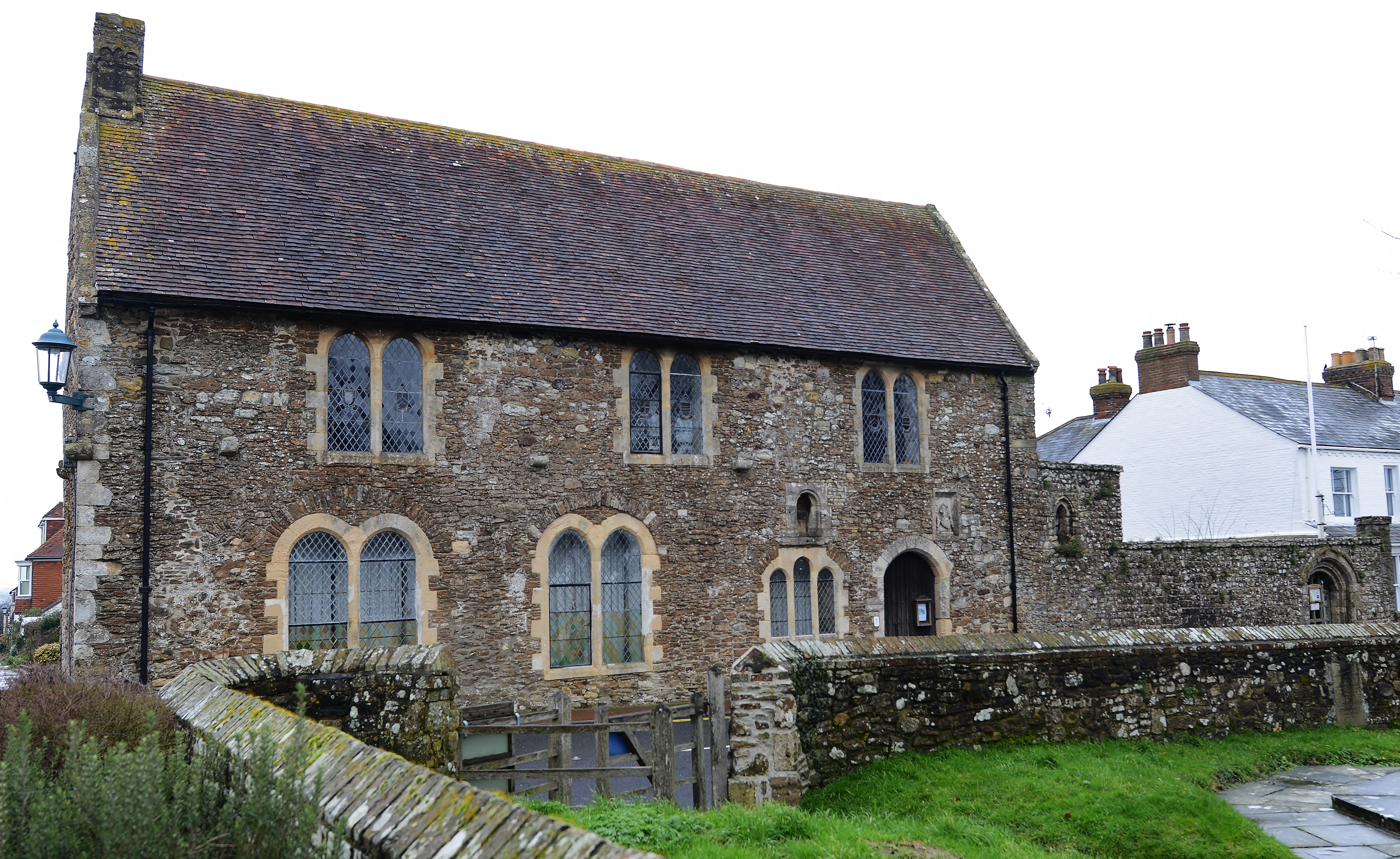
- The Court Hall building that houses the museum
- Established: 1950
- Location: High Street, Winchelsea, East Sussex TN36 4EA, England
- Coordinates: 50.92483°N 0.70849°E
- Type: Local museum
- Website: winchelsea.com/museum

Winchelsea Court Hall Museum is a local museum in Winchelsea, East Sussex, southern England.

The Winchelsea Court Hall is one of the oldest buildings in the town, although it was extensively restored in the 19th century. The crown-post roof dates from the 15th century, with a medieval chimney. The museum itself is housed on the first floor of the building in the courtroom.

The museum presents the history of the town of Winchelsea, including maps, models, pottery, and other displays. There are wall panels listing mayors of the town from 1295 onwards.

The museum was established in 1950. One of the first accessions for the museum collection was a set of photographs of Winchelsea, presented by Hastings Corporation. Subsequent accessions have included artefacts associated with the Cinque Ports and archaeological items.

== See also ==
- Winchelsea Court Hall
