= The Armoury, Winchelsea =

Armoury
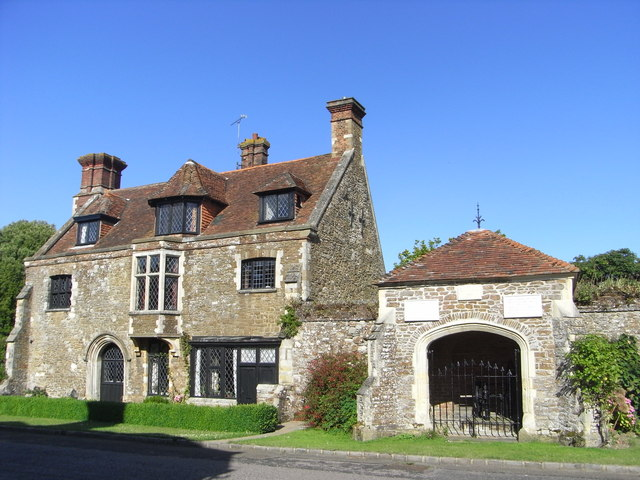
- Armoury, Winchelsea
- Interactive map of the Armoury area

General information
- Location: Winchelsea, England
- Coordinates: 50°55′30.4″N 0°42′36.7″E

Listed Building – Grade II*
- Feature: The Armoury
- Designated: 3 August 1961
- Reference no.: 1234432

The Armoury is a Grade II* listed building in Winchelsea, East Sussex England.

== History and architecture ==
The Armoury is a medieval building on Castle Street in Winchelsea. The vaulted cellar beneath the house dates from around 1300. The west end dates from the 14th century and the east end from the 15th century. It was much altered in the 18th century and later.

For a time it was the Bear Inn, a public house. It was during the Napoleonic Wars when the Duke of Wellington's army was quartered in the town that it became known as the Armoury. It was later home to the weavers of the English Linen Company and then occupied by John Sharp who built a large brick oven against the north wall of the house to bake bread with flour ground at St Leonard’s Mill. In 1898 the property was for sale, and advertised in the Sussex Agricultural Express on 23 April 1898 as

All that Freehold House, Shop, and Premises in Castle-street, containing baker’s shop, entrance hall, parlour, living-room, small study, pantry, large bakehouse with seven-bushel oven, cellar and four bedrooms, and four garrets and two small rooms, shut off and unused; garden with wood lodge, van lodge and stable, with loft over, and piggery adjoining. Water is laid on.

From 1898 to 1939 it was the home of Miss (Julia) Maud Peel, an artist. Her great-great-grandfather, Jonathan Peel 1752-1834 and Sir Robert Peel, 1st Baronet were both sons of Robert Parsley Peel, so she was related to Sir Robert Peel, twice Prime Minister of the United Kingdom.

Cellars in the garden which are Grade II listed were excavated in 1929–30.

It was advertised for sale in 1966. It was bought by a Dutch couple in 1977 for £42,250. It was advertised for sale again in 1988 with a guide price of £550,000. The property was put up for sale again in 1992 at an asking price of £350,000.
