= Strand House, Winchelsea =

- Old Poor Houses

- Location within East Sussex
- 50°55′33″N 0°42′48″E
- Type: Sussex hall house
- Location: Winchelsea
- OS grid reference: TQ 90747 17530

History
- Built: 1425

Site notes
- Area: East Sussex
- Architectural style: Timber framed

Listed Building – Grade II
- Official name: The Strand House
- Designated: 3 August 1961
- Reference no.: 1234818

Strand House was the Parish Workhouse of the Sussex town of Winchelsea known as the "Old Poor Houses". It was located on The Strand.

== Winchelsea ==
In the 13th century, old Winchelsea was one of England's most prosperous ports, particularly involved in the wine trade from Gascony but was lost to the sea. The new town of Winchelsea was laid out in 1283 in the form of a continental bastides town as a commercial centre for the importing of wine. The port was moved to the area of flat land, below the cliffs along the Strand. It was a river port, at the mouth of the River Brede which flowed out into a large lagoon, protected by a sandbar from the open waters of the Channel. The port connected with the town by a road that went up Strand Hill, through Strand Gate to the market place. The returning route went through the Landgate or Pipewell Gate, down Ferry Hill and into the port area.

== History ==
Strand House was built just behind the port area at its eastern end at the foot of Strand Hill. It is thought to be located behind the Fish Market and re-used parts of stone walls from earlier store houses in the Quay area. A substantial farmhouse was built using the remains of these stone walls in 1425, (Note: Previous owners statement of dendrochronology performed in 1985) probably by the church to farm the land in front of the house as the port declined and the sea retreated. A small second house, now known as "The Crow's Nest" stood behind Strand House and was constructed as a timber framed Sussex Hall house. If the house was owned by the church it is likely that it came into use as the town's workhouse after the town's decline in 1530 due to the silting up of the port and river. By 1565 the town was reduced to only 109 households when in the 14th century it had numbered in excess of 500 households.

The earliest known written record of Strand House is in a parliamentary report of 1777 which recorded a parish Workhouse in use at Rye with accommodation for 60 inmates; Brede with the capacity for 30; Iden that was able to house 20; and Winchelsea—St Thomas the Apostle with facilities for 24 inmates.

There is a collection of written correspondence relating to the workhouse in the Sussex Records Society archives dating from the early 19th century. An example is give below: "PAR 511/35/1/21 1 Sep 1823 Letter from William Watson, Rye to the overseers of Winchelsea John West (the bearer hereof) having informed me that he has made application to be appointed master of the poorhouse at Winchelsea and that it is necessary for him to produce testimonials of his good conduct, I beg to say that I believe him to be a sober, honest and civil man and very trustworthy. I have known his wife also many years and believe her to be a steady, honest, industrious woman".

In 1834, the Poor Law Amendment Act came into force and the Rye Poor Law Union was formed on 27 July 1835. Its operation was overseen by an elected Board of Guardians, 18 in number, representing its 12 constituent parishes. Initially, Rye Union made use of existing parish workhouse accommodation at Rye, Northiam and Brede. Former parish workhouses at Beckley, Brede, Icklesham, Playden, Udimore and Winchelsea were sold off in the late 1830s and construction of a new purpose-built workhouse for 436 inmates began in 1843 with the first admissions taking place in 1845. The Rye Union was located on a hill behind the town of Rye on the site of the current Rye Memorial Hospital.

At this point, Strand House was sold as a farm, consisting of Strand House, Crow's Nest Cottage, Appletree Wick and the Old Malthouse; census returns for 1841 through to 1901 show that it remained as a farm throughout the remainder of the century. In 1922, the property was bought by two sisters who disposed of the outlying buildings to leave the property as just Strand House and the Crows Nest. They opened the houses as a guest house and it remains as one to current times.

== Construction ==
Strand House was built in about 1425. The two-storey timber-framed building's east wall has plaster infilling and exposed timber whereas the ground floor on north front is constructed with red brick and has tile hung above. Stone rubble was used to build the east front of the south wing and the ground floor of the south front, which has tile hung above. It has casement windows, a 17th-century chimney stack, a tiled roof and attic. There is a dormer plus three windows.

Set in the grounds of Strand House is the jointly occupied two-storey timber-framed Crows Nest Cottage, built c. the 17th century or earlier. It adjoins Strand House on the west. It has plaster infilling, a tiled roof and casement windows. Weatherboarding was used to re-face the north front. The house is a "House with an Open Hall" and consists of two bays 7.90 by 4.80 metres (25.9 by 15.7 feet) and is in contracted form, incorporating a single bayed hall at one end with an overshot cross-passage and a standard servants area at the other. It shows a good example of close-studding, which was decorative framing used on the street-facing side of the building while the less decorative large panel framing was used on rear elevations. It was introduced into this part of Sussex from 1430 and became common from 1450.

== Depictions in art and literature ==
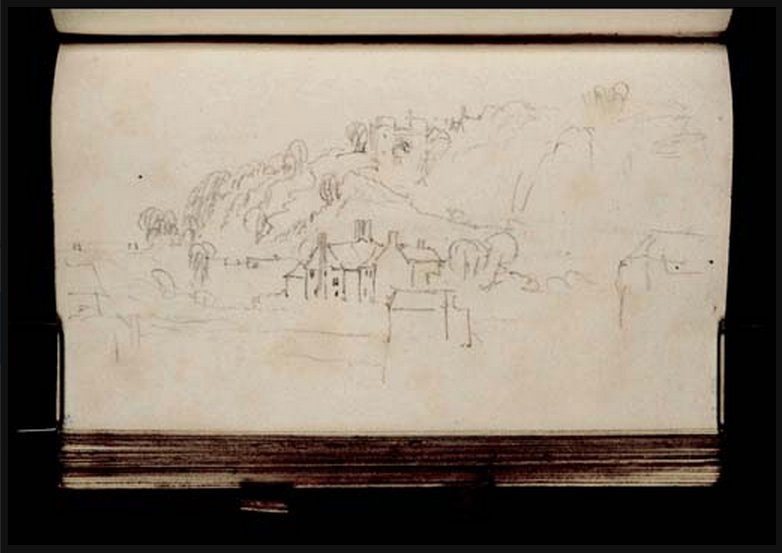
Winchelsea; the Workhouse and Strand Gate

Winchelsea, Sussex, Soldiers on the March c.1828

Strand House is included in the sketchbook of William Turner lodged in the Tate Gallery, under reference D10519 "from Richmond Hill; Hastings to Margate Sketchbook" [Finberg CXL], "Winchelsea; the Workhouse and Strand Gate". Artist: Joseph Mallord William Turner 1775–1851. Date: c.1816-19. Classification: on paper, unique Medium: Graphite on paper Dimensions: support: 155 x 95 mm.

The painting that resulted from this sketch is called "Winchelsea, Sussex, Soldiers on the March c.1828" and depicts a column of soldiers marching up Strand Hill with a group of camp followers seated in the foreground. Soldiers had been stationed in Winchelsea during the Napoleonic Wars to help guard the coast and along the Royal Military Canal which runs along the marshes below the town. The area was also a haunt of smugglers and coastguards often called on the soldiers for support in dealing with them. Turner would have seen the soldiers garrisoned in Winchelsea when he passed through the town in 1816 on his sketching tour.
