= Winchelsea =

Town in East Sussex, England

Coordinates: 50.9251°N 0.7088°E

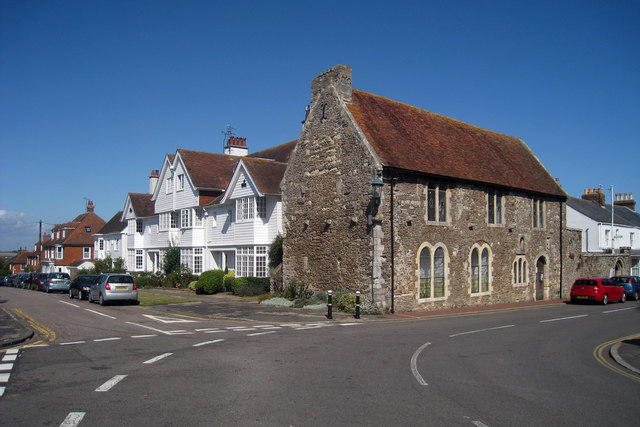
- The Court Hall, High Street

- Location within East Sussex
- Population: 600
- OS grid reference: TQ9017
  - London: 54 mi (87 km) NW
- Civil parish: Icklesham
- District: Rother
- Shire county: East Sussex
- Region: South East
- Country: England
- Sovereign state: United Kingdom
- Post town: WINCHELSEA
- Postcode district: TN36
- Dialling code: 01797
- Police: Sussex
- Fire: East Sussex
- Ambulance: South East Coast
- UK Parliament: Hastings and Rye
- Website: https://www.winchelsea.com

Winchelsea (/ˈwɪntʃəlsi/) is a town in the county of East Sussex, England, located between the High Weald and the Romney Marsh, approximately two miles (three kilometres) southwest of Rye and seven miles (eleven kilometres) north east of Hastings. The current town, which was founded in 1288, replaced an earlier town of the same name, known as Old Winchelsea, that was lost to coastal erosion in the late medieval period. Winchelsea is part of the civil parish of Icklesham.

The mayor of Winchelsea is chosen each year from amongst the members of the corporation, who are known as freemen, rather than being elected by public vote. New freemen are themselves chosen by existing members of the corporation. Thus, in its current form, the corporation is effectively a relic of Winchelsea's days as a 'rotten borough' (when Winchelsea elected two MPs but the number of voters was restricted to about a dozen, sometimes fewer). The corporation lost its remaining civil and judicial powers in 1886 but was preserved as a charity by an Act of Parliament to maintain the membership of the Cinque Port Confederation. The mayor and corporation in Winchelsea now have a largely ceremonial role, together with responsibility for the ongoing care and maintenance of the main listed ancient monuments in the town and the Winchelsea Court Hall Museum.

== Name ==
The name Winchelsea probably derives from the Old English wincelēg meaning 'island on the corner', referring to the town's position on a raised piece of land on a river bend.

The name Winchelsea may be derived from the colloquial word 'qwent' that refers to the marshland behind the town and the Saxon word 'chesil' meaning shingle beach or embankment.

== History ==
=== Old Winchelsea ===
The original town, Old Winchelsea, was on a massive shingle bank that protected the confluence of the estuaries of the Rivers Brede, Rother and Tillingham and provided a sheltered anchorage called the Camber. The old town was recorded as Winceleseia in 1130 and Old Wynchchelse in 1321. The Normans used to call the place Wincenesel.

After the Norman Conquest, Winchelsea was of great importance in cross-Channel trade (acting in particular as an entrepôt for London) and as a naval base. In the 13th century, it became famous in the wine trade from Gascony. Old Winchelsea likely reached the height of its prosperity and influence around the year 1200. According to the Pipe Roll of 1204, an important royal tax record, Winchelsea ranked as the tenth most important port in England and the third on the southeast coast, behind London and Southampton. The town's merchants reportedly paid £62.2s.4d into the royal treasury, compared to only £10.13s.5d for neighbouring Rye. There may have been, in the 1260s, over 700 houses, two churches and over 50 inns and taverns, thus implying a population of thousands of people at the time.

Beginning in the 1230s, severe storms repeatedly ravaged Old Winchelsea. By the 1240s, the shingle barrier upon which the town sat was under significant stress, and the town began to receive annual funds to strengthen or repair its sea defences. Around 1250, the barrier was breached permanently, and tides began to run all the way to Appledore, eight miles to the north. In 1271, a storm reportedly washed "a great part" of the church of St. Thomas away, and a decade later, the situation had deteriorated sufficiently for Edward I to order the town's relocation to higher ground. Eventually, a series of three storms in 1287 and 1288 flooded and destroyed the town entirely.

=== New Winchelsea ===
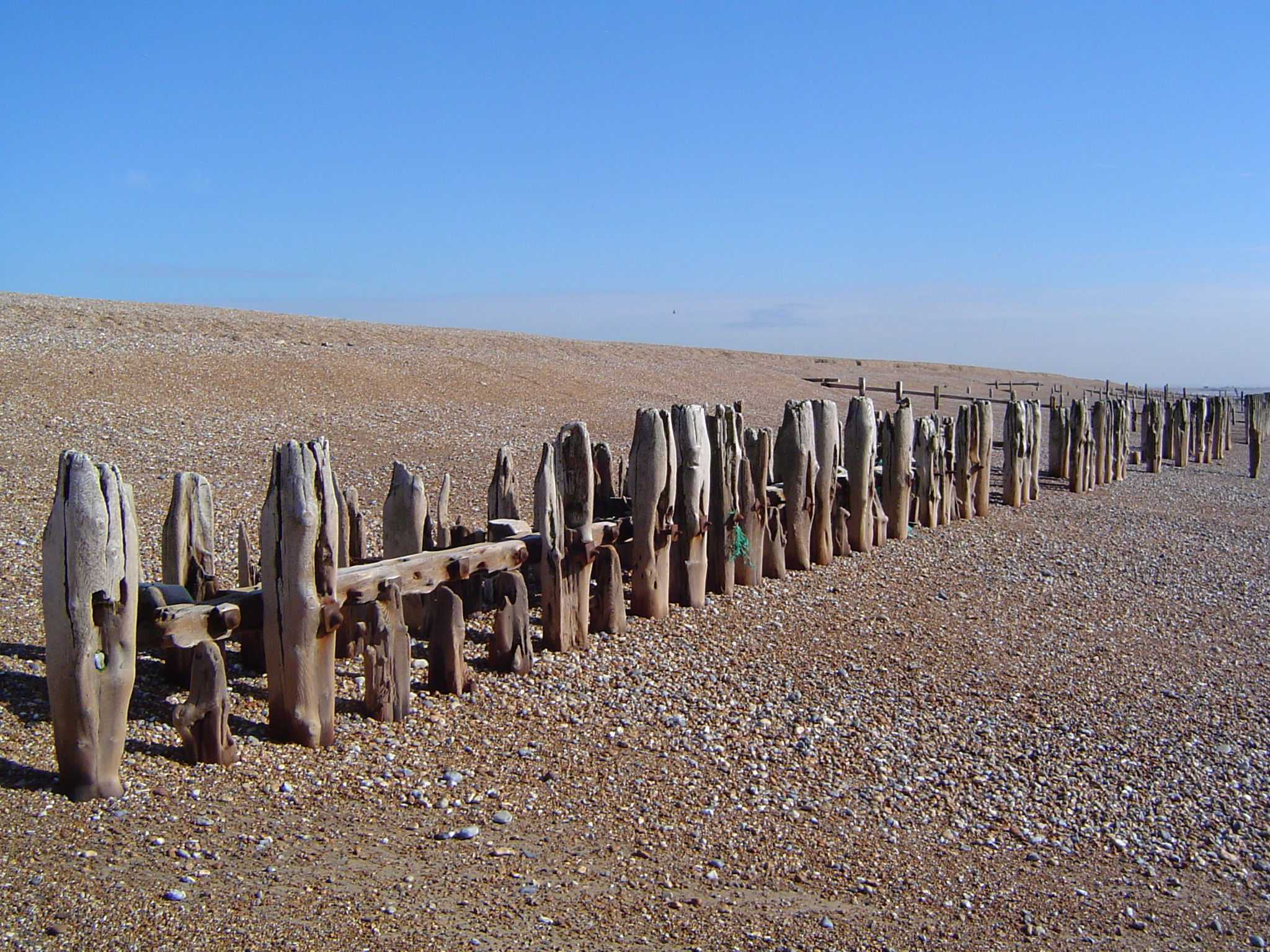
Sea defences, near Winchelsea

In the late 13th century, the old town's population moved to the town's present location. In 1281 Edward I granted a charter for a planned town, based on a grid layout, to be built on higher ground on the western edge of Romney Marsh and Camber Sands. The site of the new town was originally the location of a hamlet and manor known as Iham. The names of the town planners are recorded as Henry le Waleys and Thomas Alard. The new town inherited the title of "Antient Town" from Old Winchelsea and retained its affiliation to the Cinque Ports confederation together with Rye and the five head-ports.

The town had a tidal harbour on the River Brede. It flourished until the middle of the 14th century, with the height of its economic prosperity coming in the first thirty or forty years after its founding. Originally, the town specialised in exporting goods, especially wool, to the continent, constituting around 70% of exports from the Cinque Ports in the first decade of the 14th century. However, by the end of the 1320s, the balance of trade had improved, and the value of the town's imports surpassed that of its exports. In particular, the town was heavily involved in the wine trade, as both an importation and transshipment hub. In 1328, Winchelsea was the second leading port in southeast England for wine imports and ninth overall. To this day, there are extensive wine cellars in Winchelsea that may still be visited.

The town's decline occurred in two separate stages, the first due primarily to the Black Death and repeated French attacks during the Hundred Years' War, and the second, starting in the late 14th century, due to the growing impracticality of its harbour. It is likely that the town was attacked for the first time by the French in February 1326. By 1346, 94 properties were abandoned, and in 1358, shortly after the arrival of the Black Death, this rose to 184, or nearly 25% of the originally 802 planned plots. By 1366, after additional French attacks, 385 properties, or nearly half the original total, were reported to be "waste, burnt, and uninhabited," and by the late 1370s, Chichester surpassed Winchelsea as the most important port in Sussex.

Starting in the late 14th century, Winchelsea entered the second phase of its decline as its harbour became progressively more inaccessible for ships. While the natural silting-up of the river was the definitive factor in the town's decline, historian David Martin claims the more significant factor initially was the broader shift in Channel commerce to using ships over 200 tons, which Winchelsea harbour could not support. Nevertheless, until as late as 1490s, Winchelsea remained one of the most important ports on the southeast coast, ahead of Rye, and was likely the third most populous town in Sussex, behind Chichester and Lewes. While in 1524 the town still counted four ships and 15 sailors, this was reduced to reportedly no ships or boats of any kind by 1561. By 1575, the population had fallen so far that only 60 houses remained inhabited.

Some of the more notable events during the Hundred Years' War to affect Winchelsea included the Castilian attack on Gravesend and the 1350 Battle of Les Espagnols sur Mer, which was fought nearby. In 1360 the town was sacked and burnt by a French expeditionary force, sent in an unsuccessful attempt to retrieve their King John II of France captured at the Battle of Poitiers four years earlier. The town was formerly Host to the ancient Winchelsea Streete Game, which reputedly originated from 1377, when the town was besieged by the French. The earliest written reference occurs in Holinshed's Chronicles of 1587. The game was by tradition played on Boxing Day, and centred on Castle Street.

Camber Castle was built by Henry VIII in the early 16th century halfway between Winchelsea and Rye to guard the approach to the Camber. Much of the stone used in its construction may have been taken from the demolition of the Franciscan monastery of Greyfriars. In the 1500s, Winchelsea hosted a small community of Huguenots.

Winchelsea retains its medieval setting on a hill surrounded by largely empty marsh, the original layout of the planned town and the largest collection of medieval wine cellars in the country with the possible exception of Norwich and Southampton. It also retains three of the four town gates and several original buildings, including the parish church, which is dedicated to St Thomas the Martyr. Another church, St Leonard's, was later the site of a windmill, which was blown down in the Great Storm of 1987. Some of the original 13th/14th-century fortifications can still be seen at the Strand Gate and Pipewell or Ferry Gate. The scale of the original plan for New Winchelsea can be judged by the site of the "New Gate", over half a mile outside the current town.

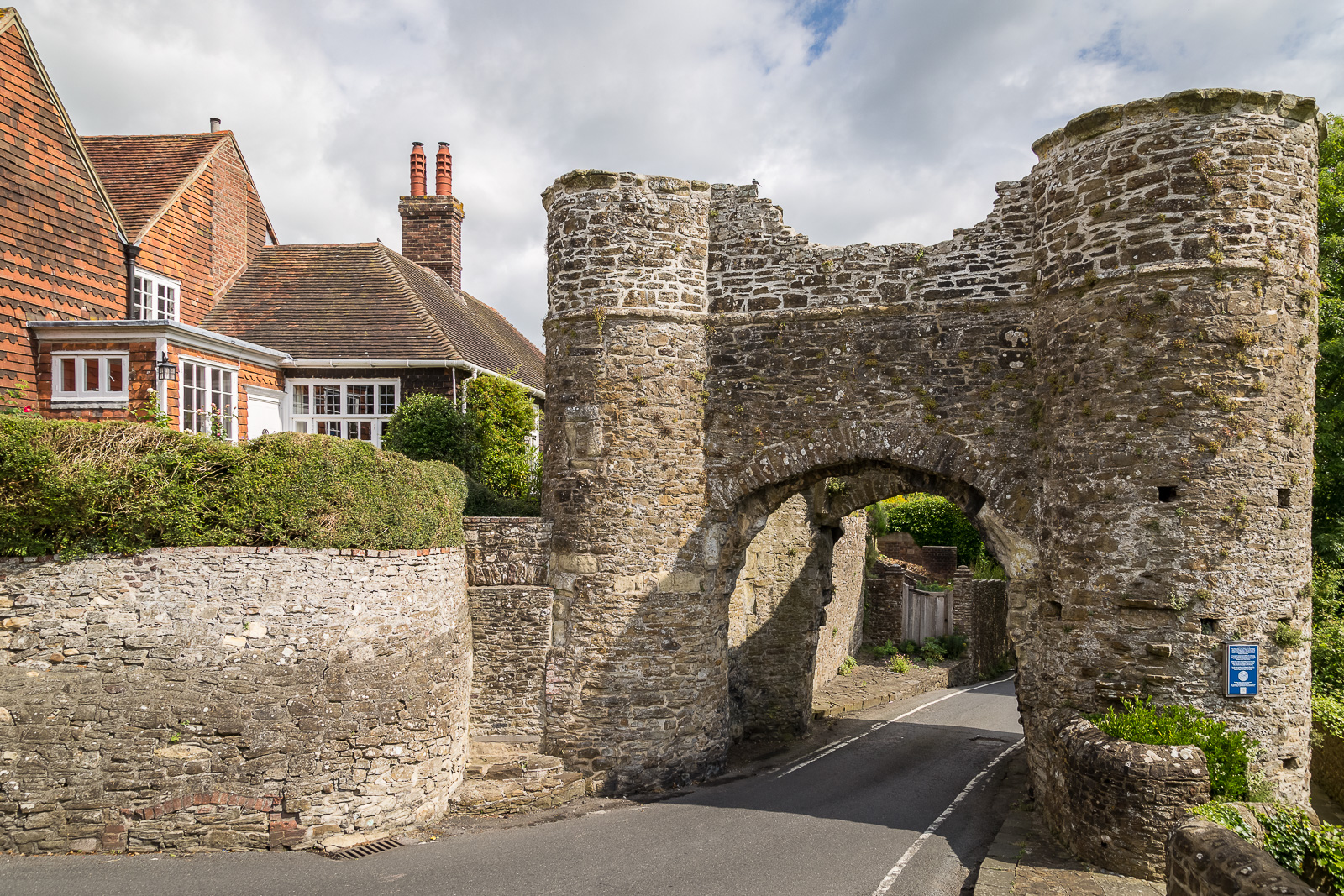
The Strand Gate

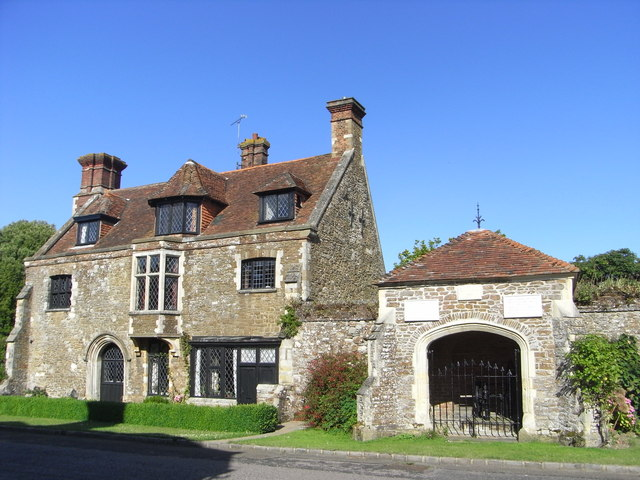
The Armoury, Winchelsea

Across the road from the churchyard stands the Court Hall, one of Winchelsea's oldest buildings, the lower floor once being the gaol. The first floor is now a museum, full of relics of the history of Winchelsea, the Corporation, and a model of the town. Nearby is the town well, dug in 1851 to save water being carried up the hill. It is thought to be 80 feet deep. At the foot of Strand Hill stands the town workhouse Strand House just behind the port area of Winchelsea which runs along the river bank on the far side of the main road. This area contains the remains of several old buildings, such as the Old Malt House and Appletree Wick while Strand House itself was built around 1425 according to dendrochronology. These buildings made up the workhouse of the parish of Winchelsea being known as "The Old Poor Houses". The area was a subject of archaeological investigation in 2013 which found the remains of the medieval wharf and a medieval boat next to the Bridge Inn.

Winchelsea stands on the main south coast road, the A259. The Royal Military Canal built in the early 19th century as a defence-line against the highly anticipated invasion by Napoleon Bonaparte passes the eastern side of the town and connects to the river Brede.

The town lends its name to the nearby seaside village of Winchelsea Beach.

== Parish church of St Thomas the Martyr ==
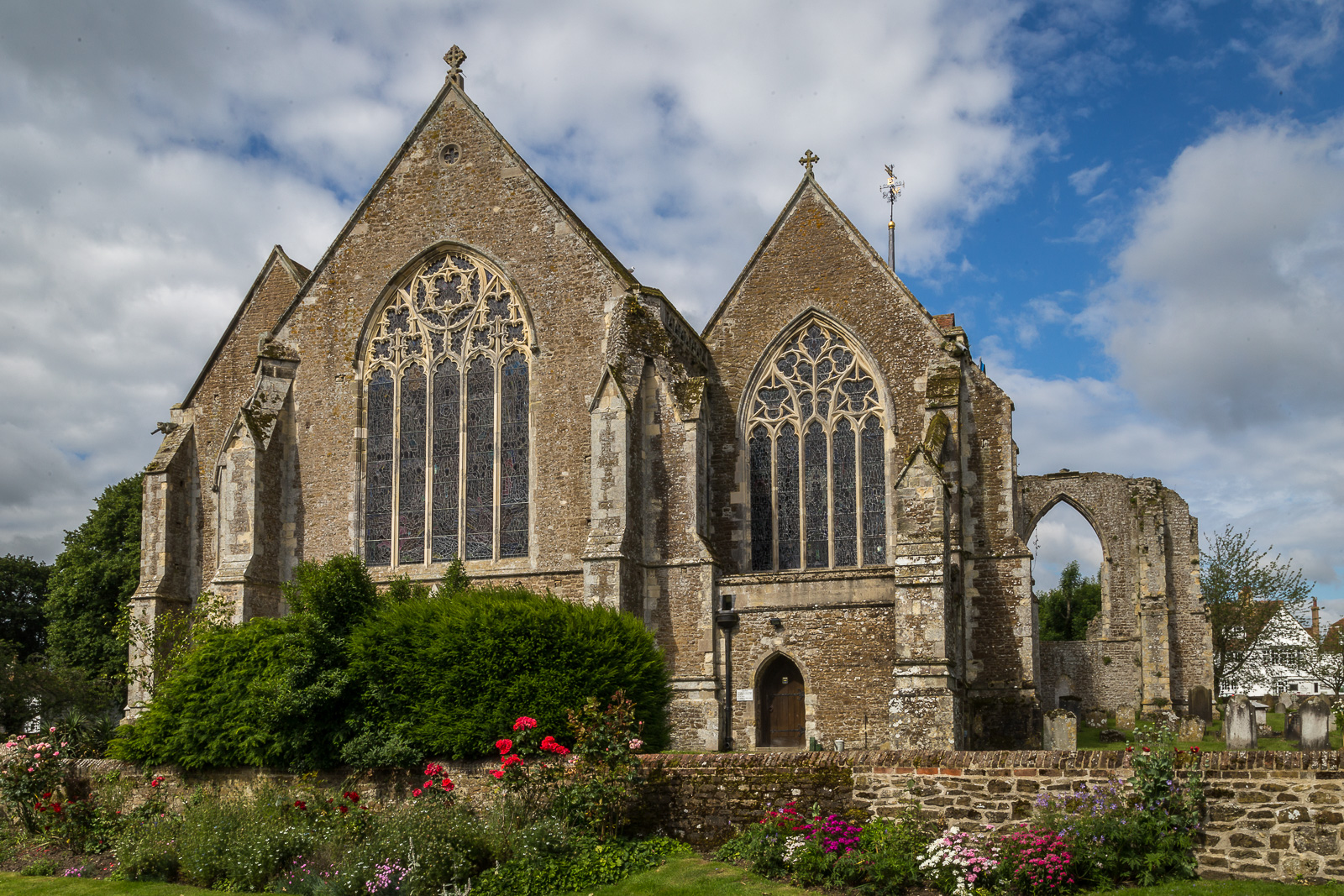
The Church of St Thomas the Martyr from the east

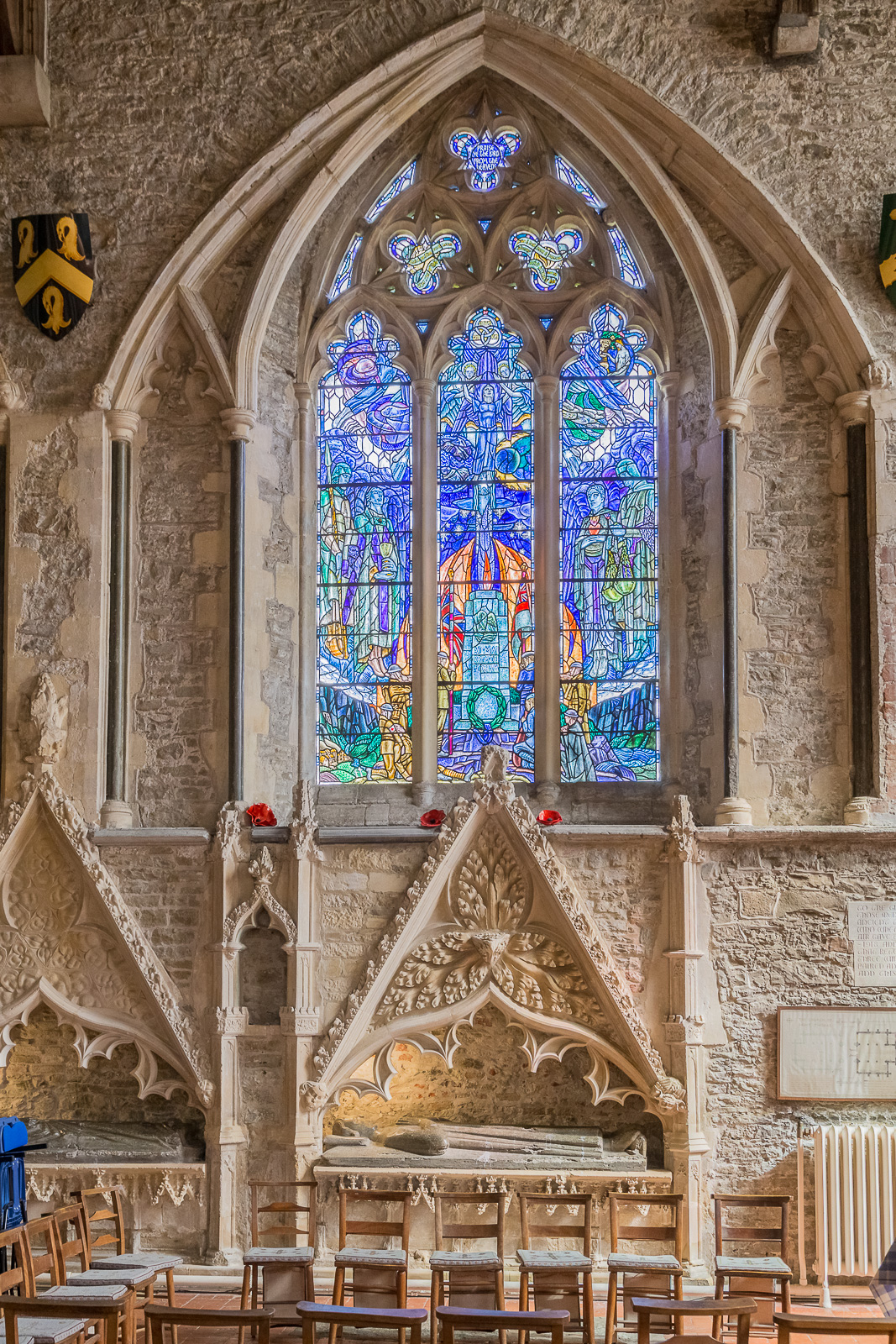
The Church of St Thomas the Martyr – stained glass window in the north aisle by Douglas Strachan

After the flood of 1287, work started almost immediately on a Gothic church, with a chancel and choir, side chapels, tower, transepts and nave, though only the chancel and chapels remain in use. The transepts are in ruins and there is nothing to be seen of the nave. By the start of the 19th century, the church had become so dilapidated it was "almost unfit for public worship". In 1850, the church was restored from dilapidation.

The stained glass windows by Douglas Strachan were installed as a memorial to the men of the town who gave their lives in the First World War, and in thanksgiving for those who returned safely home. The windows in the south aisle on the themes of Land, Air and Fire, and Sea are some of the finest stained glass of the twentieth century in Britain. They were presented to the church by Robert Younger, Baron Blanesburgh and dedicated in 1933 by the Archbishop of Canterbury. The altar and retable in the Lady Chapel were also presented by Lord Blanesborough as was the organ above the west porch.

The windows on the south aisle were also designed by Strachan, including the window over the sedilia in the south wall commemorating the heroism of the crew of the Rye lifeboat, the Mary Stanford, who lost their lives during a storm in 1928.

The clock on the north side of the tower was overhauled in 1977 and again in 1998, when the dial was repainted.

== Governance ==
In 2006 a group of local residents requested Rother District Council to review the parishing arrangements of Icklesham, with a view to creating a separate Winchelsea Parish. The Parish of Winchelsea Action Group submitted a petition in favour from 228 electors. Other survey and polling evidence suggest the residents of Winchelsea are in favour by a majority of up to 2–1, but that the remainder of Icklesham parish was against the idea by a wide margin. In the May 2007 parish council elections, the proposal for a separate parish council was the key issue. The three candidates supporting a separate parish for Winchelsea were elected by a clear majority in a record turnout of some 66% and the two opposing candidates (including a member of the Corporation and former councillor) were defeated.

== Transport ==
Winchelsea railway station is located 3/4 mile (1.2 kilometres) to the north in the Brede valley, on the Marshlink line between Ashford International and Hastings.

The A259 road, a major road from Hastings to Folkestone, runs around the edge of the village. Stagecoach Group run a bus service from Hastings to Rye via Winchelsea.

== Notable people ==
- Vera Atkins (1908–2000), squadron leader of Special Operations Executive F Section, Col. Maurice Buckmaster's assistant at SOE, lived in Winchelsea after the Second World War.
- Joseph Conrad (1857–1924), writer, lived for a time in a farmhouse called 'The Pent' as subtenant to Ford Madox Ford.
- Ford Madox Ford (1873–1939), writer, moved to Winchelsea in 1901.
- Henry Irving (1838–1905), actor, lived with Ellen Terry in a summer house in Winchelsea from 1892.
- John Harris (c. 1666–1719), author and editor, was rector of Winchelsea.
- Rod Hull (1935–1999), puppeteer, lived and died in Winchelsea.
- Spike Milligan (1918–2002), comedian, writer, musician, poet, playwright, soldier and actor, lived near Winchelsea, and is buried in the churchyard of St Thomas's, Winchelsea.
- Maud Peel (1844–1939) artist
- Eric Slater (1896–1963), artist and printmaker, lived in Winchelsea.
- Sir Melford Stevenson (1902–1987), barrister and High Court Judge, lived in Winchelsea 1953–1987. His ashes are buried in the churchyard.
- Ellen Terry (1847–1928), actress, bought and lived in a summer house called Tower Cottage in Winchelsea, beginning in 1892.
- William Makepeace Thackeray (1811–1863), novelist, lived in Winchelsea for a time, and set his unfinished novel Denis Duval there.

== See also ==
- List of former members of parliament
- Mayor of Winchelsea
