= Cinque Ports Fleet =

- Active: 1260 - 1588
- Allegiance: Kingdom of England
- Branch: Navy Royal
- Type: Fleet
- Role: Convoy Protection, Expeditionary Force, Transportation, Patrol
- Garrison/HQ: Dover, England

The Cinque Ports Fleet was the a temporary formation of ships supplied to the crown from the Confederation of the Cinque Ports for particular naval expeditions during particular campaigns of the Kingdom of England from 1260 to 1558.

The fleet was commanded by the Admiral of Cinque Ports Fleet also known as the Admiral-in-Chief of the Fleet.

== History ==
The Cinque Port Fleet was a collective of ships owned by the Confederation of the Cinque Ports that was commanded by the Warden of the Cinque Ports later called the Lord Warden of the Cinque Ports, he was one of the Wardens of the Coast during the Middle Ages. It was one of two naval forces that could be drawn upon by the Monarch of England during times of crisis during Middle Ages. The cinque port fleet was not owned by the King therefore he had to avail of the services of the cinque ports in return for payment. However it was regarded as the primary Royal Fleet of maritime England until at least the beginning of the 15th century. In addition there was a second smaller naval force available to the monarch consisting of ships directly owned by him known as the King's Ships or the Royal Squadron.

== In command ==
=== Admiral of the Cinque Port Fleet ===
Incomplete list of post holders:

1. 1300: Gervase Alard
2. 1306: Gervase Alard
3. 1314: Sir William de Creye
4. 1316–1317: Sir Nicholas Kyriel
5. 1322–1323: Sir Robert Battayle
6. 1332: Sir Waresius de Valoignes
7. 1333–1335: Sir William Clinton, Earl of Huntingdon
8. 1335–1336: Sir John Cobham, 2nd Baron Cobham and Sir Peter Bard (joint)
9. 1340–1343: William Clinton, Earl of Huntingdon
10. 1343: Sir Walter Manny, 1st Baron Manny

== Bibliography ==
1. Clowes, Sir William Laird (1897). The Royal Navy: A History From the Earliest Times to the Present. Vol. I. London: Sampson Low, Marston and Company.
2. Haydn, Joseph (1851). The Book of Dignities: Containing Lists of the Official Personages of the British Empire ... from the Earliest Periods to the Present Time ... Together with the Sovereigns and Rulers of Europe, from the Foundation of Their Respective States; the Peerage of England and Great Britain ... London: Longmans, Brown, Green and Longmans.
3. O'Neill, Sean (3 April 2002). "Cinque ports mourn the loss of a cherished Lord Warden". The Daily Telegraph Newspaper. London, England. Retrieved 2 October 2019.
4. Rose, Susan (2013). England's Medieval Navy 1066-1509: Ships, Men & Warfare. Barnsley, England: Seaforth Publishing. ISBN 9781848321373.
