= Maud Peel =

(Julia) Maud Peel (1843–1939) was an English artist.

== Life ==
She was born in London in 1843 and baptised at St Mary on Paddington Green Church on 15 December 1844, the daughter of Jonathan Peel (1806–85), Barrister at Law, and his wife, Mary née Wilde (1812-1876). Her great-great-grandfather, Jonathan Peel (1752-1834) and Sir Robert Peel, 1st Baronet were both sons of Robert Parsley Peel, so she was related to Robert Peel, twice Prime Minister of the United Kingdom.

In 1851 she was living at Knowlmere Manor, Newton-in-Bowland, Lancashire. By 1861 she was at 7 Norfolk Crescent, Paddington, and in 1871 and 1881 back at Knowlmere Manor.

Although in 1901 she was in the census as at the home of her cousin Hester Ann Curteis Peel at Heronden, Tenterden, Kent, she had purchased The Armoury, Winchelsea Sussex in the late 1890s and she owned it until her death on 8 February 1939, aged 95.

== Career ==
Early exhibitions include ‘’The Way Through The Wood’ in 1879 and "Brook at Yorkshire" at the Irish Fine Art Society in Dublin in 1880, and the Liverpool Ladies Art Society in 1884 where she exhibited some studies of flowers.

In 1885 she enrolled at the new art school in Bushey, Hertfordshire, set up by Hubert von Herkomer and in 1893 she was tutored by Charles Lasar in Walberswick, Suffolk. Her picture of "Waterloo Bridge, Evening" was exhibited at the Dudley Gallery Art Society in 1893 and "The River, Walberswick" and "The Hamlet at Evening, Walberswick" which were exhibited in 1895. In 1899 she exhibited drawings including two sunset sketches, one of St Peter's, Rome near the Ponte Molle, and the other of Badbury Rings, Dorset.
