= Greyfriars, Winchelsea =

Grade I listed building in Rother, United Kingdom

Coordinates: 50.9218°N 0.7103°E

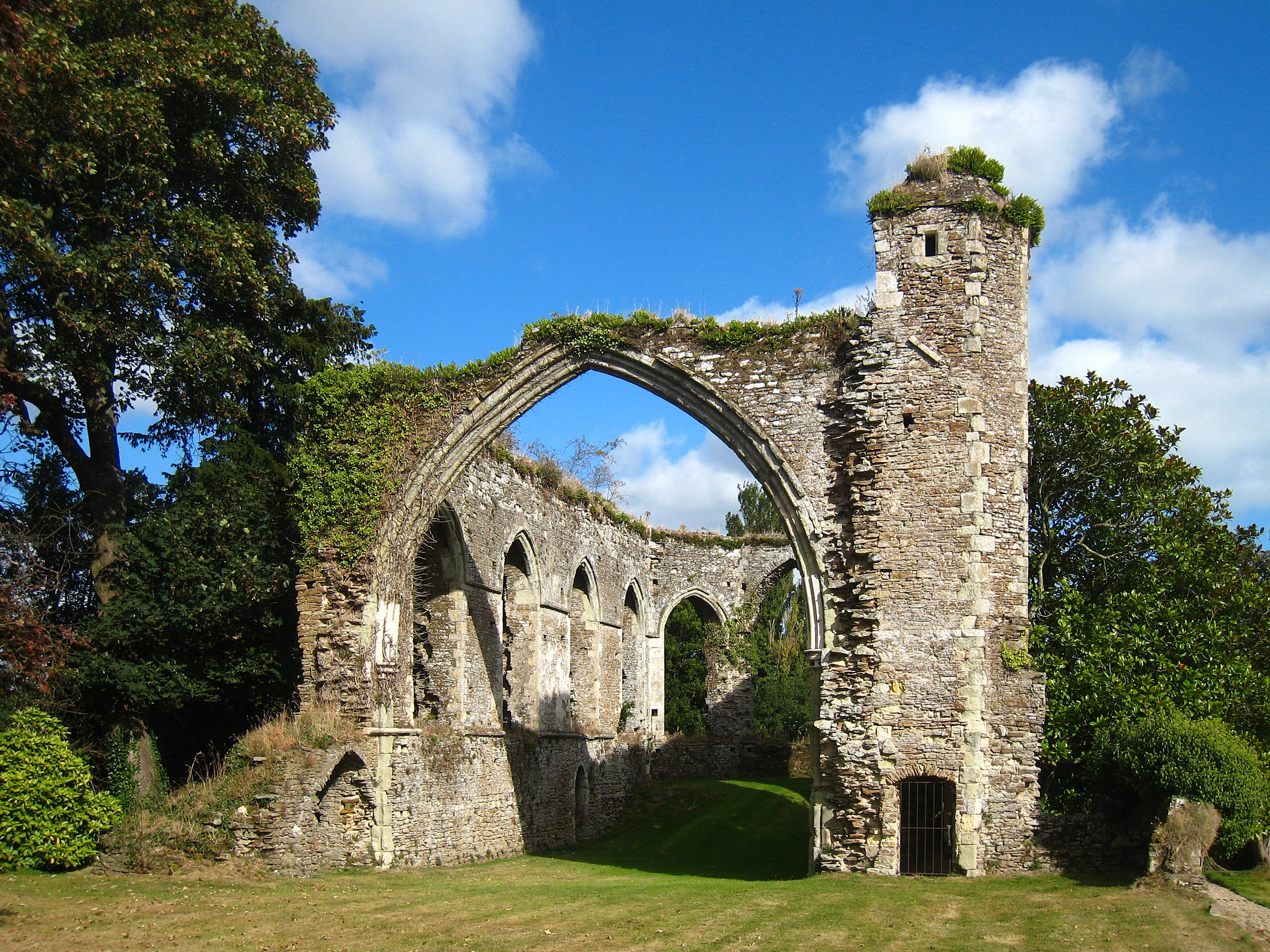
The ruined church at Greyfriars

Greyfriars is a country estate in Winchelsea, East Sussex, England. It contains a ruined medieval monastery and church and a 19th-century house.

== History ==
A house for the Order of Friars Minor was established in Winchelsea Old Town by 1242. The friary moved to its current location in 1285, after the order purchased 28 acres (11 ha) from John Bone of Wickham, on the site of the new town. It became an important site as Winchelsea flourished as a port in the Middle Ages, but usage declined after the mid-14th century. It was sold during the Dissolution of the Monasteries in 1538 in a state of disrepair, and was used as a barn for some years afterwards. It was listed as a scheduled monument in 1915, and is one of the best surviving instances of Franciscan architecture in England.

The surviving remains include a full-height choir, a portion of the north aisle's east wall, and a section of the south wall. A doorway was added onto the north wall around the 17th century. The friary church's chancel, constructed around 1310–1320, has also partially survived.

The country house was built in 1819 by Richard Stileman in a Gothic style. It replaced an earlier lodging house on the same site. The house is on the southern edge of the town, adjacent to the friary. In the late 20th century, ownership passed to East Sussex County Council who used it as a day care centre, before being sold to private hands in 2000. In 2015, it was put on the market for £4.5 million. It was Grade II listed in 1987.

== Cultural references ==
The house is referred to in a never-finished William Makepeace Thackeray novel as the home of the Weston brothers, a group of highwaymen.
