= Wakefield by-election =

Wakefield by-election may refer to:

== Australia ==
- 1909 Wakefield by-election, following the death of the Speaker, Frederick Holder
- 1938 Wakefield by-election, following the death of Charles Hawker

== United Kingdom ==
- 1874 Wakefield by-election, following the voided election of Edward Green
- 1932 Wakefield by-election, following the death of George Hillman
- 1954 Wakefield by-election, following the death of Arthur Greenwood
- 2022 Wakefield by-election, following the resignation of Imran Ahmad Khan
