= Edward Brotherton, 1st Baron Brotherton =

British politician (1856 – 1930)

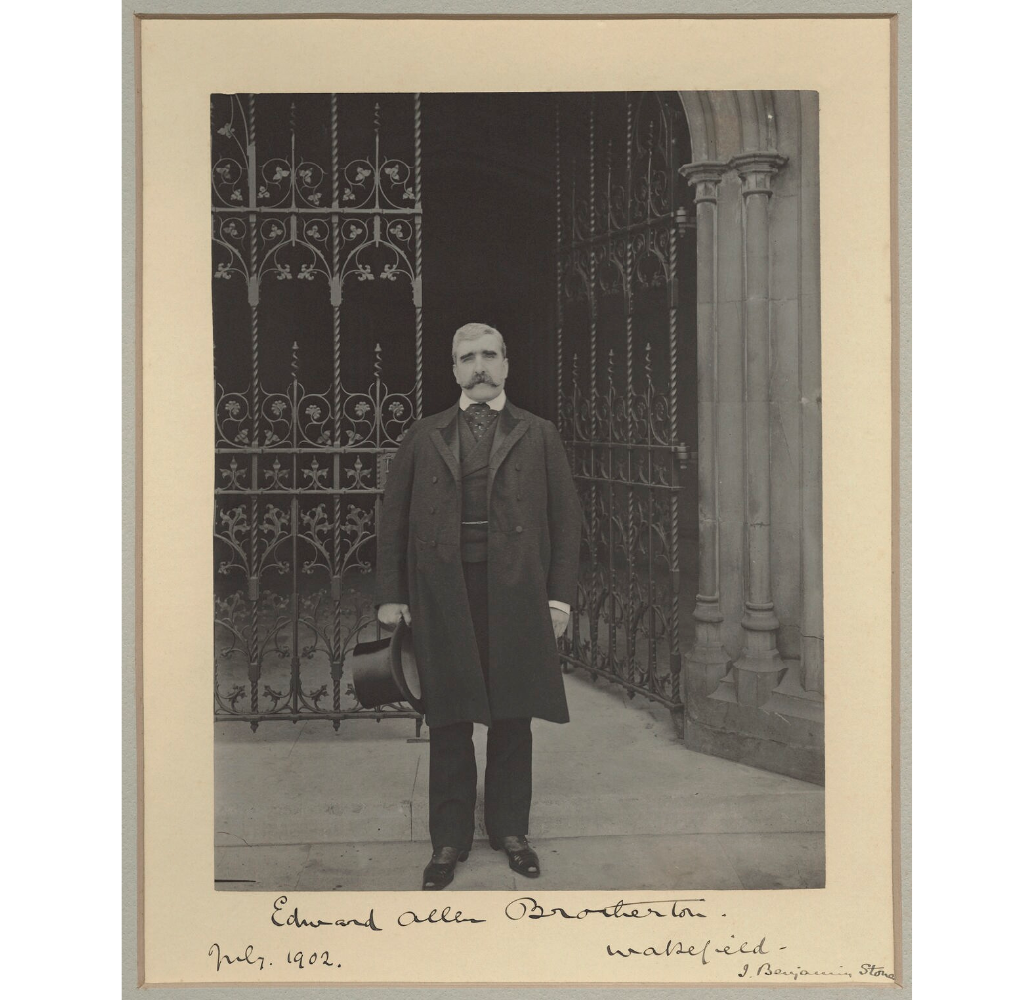
Edward Brotherton photographed in 1902 after his election as MP for Wakefield

Edward Allen Brotherton, 1st Baron Brotherton, JP, DL (1 April 1856 – 21 October 1930), known as Sir Edward Brotherton, Bt, between 1918 and 1929, was an industrialist in Wakefield, West Riding of Yorkshire, England and a benefactor to the University of Leeds and other causes. He was also a Conservative Party politician, and sat in the House of Commons between 1902 and 1922.

== Early life and education ==
Edward Allen Brotherton was born 1 April 1856 at 2 Tiverton Place, Ardwick Green, Manchester to Theophilus Brotherton, a yarn agent, and Sarah née O'Donnell. He was also related to educational reformer Edward Brotherton and to the first MP for Salford, Joseph Brotherton.

At 16, Brotherton signed up to be a ship’s boy on a freighter leaving Liverpool. A storm and a leak in the ship led to a frightening 14 hours before the ship could be brought back to Birkenhead. Brotherton made his way back to Manchester and did not go to sea again. He became a junior clerk with D.V. Steward and Co. of Manchester, manufacturers of sulphate of ammonia. He rose to become manager of the company, studying in the evenings at Owens College in Manchester. At this time, he also attended evening classes in chemistry taught by Henry Roscoe at Owens College, Manchester. At 19 he began work at a chemical works in Wakefield, West Yorkshire.

== Business career ==
When he was 22, he founded a business in Wakefield with the Dyson brothers. Brotherton decided to focus on making chemical processes more efficient and economical, and in three years he had earned enough money to buy out the Dysons. Brotherton & Co. was born. The first of Brotherton’s nine factories was based in Wakefield. Brotherton & Co’s business was the distillation and purification of ammonia liquor and later, the distillation of coal-tar. The company manufactured ammonium sulphate, taking advantage of plentiful supplies of ammoniacal liquor produced by the local coal and gas industry and supplied ammonia to the textile industry and for use in the extraction of gold.

In 1889 Brotherton's partnership with the Dyson brothers ended and he continued the business alone under the name Brotherton and Co. The company would go on to become one of the largest private chemical companies in the country expanding into coal tar distillation and manufacturing products such as pitch, TNT and creosote during the First World War. The business also moved from headquarters in Wakefield to City Chambers, Leeds. Brotherton's nephew Charles Ratcliffe, husband of Dorothy Una Ratcliffe, later succeeded his uncle as head of the business and took the name Brotherton. The company continued after Brotherton's death until 1957 when it was acquired by British Chrome and Chemicals. The company later traded under various names such as Brotherton Chemicals Ltd, Brotherton Speciality Products Ltd and Brotherton Esseco Ltd.

== Political career ==
Brotherton was Conservative MP for Wakefield from 1902 to 1910 and again from 1918 to 1922, he became very attached to the town; winning his first seat in parliament under the slogan "a Wakefield man for Wakefield" - despite being from Manchester. He was first elected at a by-election in March 1902, after his predecessor Lord Milton (subsequently the 7th Earl Fitzwilliam) inherited a peerage and became a member of the House of Lords.

Brotherton was elected as Alderman/Councillor for Leeds City from 1911 to 1915 and was Lord Mayor of Leeds in 1913–14. He was also an Alderman of Wakefield from 1901. He had a keen sense of public duty and acted as the Mayor of Wakefield (1902-1903), the Lord Mayor of Leeds (1913-1914), and Member of Parliament for Wakefield (1902-1910, 1918-1920). At the beginning of the First World War he raised and equipped the 15th battalion of the West Yorkshire Regiment, known as “The Leeds Pals”, and became its Honorary Colonel.

During the time Brotherton served as Lord Mayor of Leeds, his niece, Dorothy Una Ratcliffe, took the role of Lady Mayoress. As Lord Mayor he raised the West Yorkshire Regiment (Leeds Pals) at his own expense, in return receiving the title of Honorary Colonel.

== Collecting ==
During his lifetime Brotherton amassed a collection including books, manuscripts and letters.

Brotherton and his niece Dorothy visited auction houses and bookshops across the country but soon realised they did not have the specialist knowledge or understanding of commercial values to build up a great library. In 1923 Lord Brotherton engaged the help of John Alexander Symington, the son of a local second-hand book seller John Simpson Symington. Lord Brotherton had visited Symington Senior’s bookshop, and on inquiring who was behind a scrapbook compilation entitled Old Leeds, he was introduced to the owner’s son. Brotherton took a liking to the young Symington and appointed him as his personal librarian, with Dorothy’s approval. They bought items at an incredible rate. By 1930, the year of Lord Brotherton’s death, the collection contained over 35,000 printed books and pamphlets, 4,000 deeds, 30,000 letters and 400 other manuscripts. They looked out for specific items they wanted to buy as well as purchasing whole libraries when they came up at auction. In 1926 Brotherton published a catalogue of the highlights of the collection. Brotherton enjoyed showing his treasures to visitors to his home and welcomed many scholars to his private library.

== Brotherton Library ==
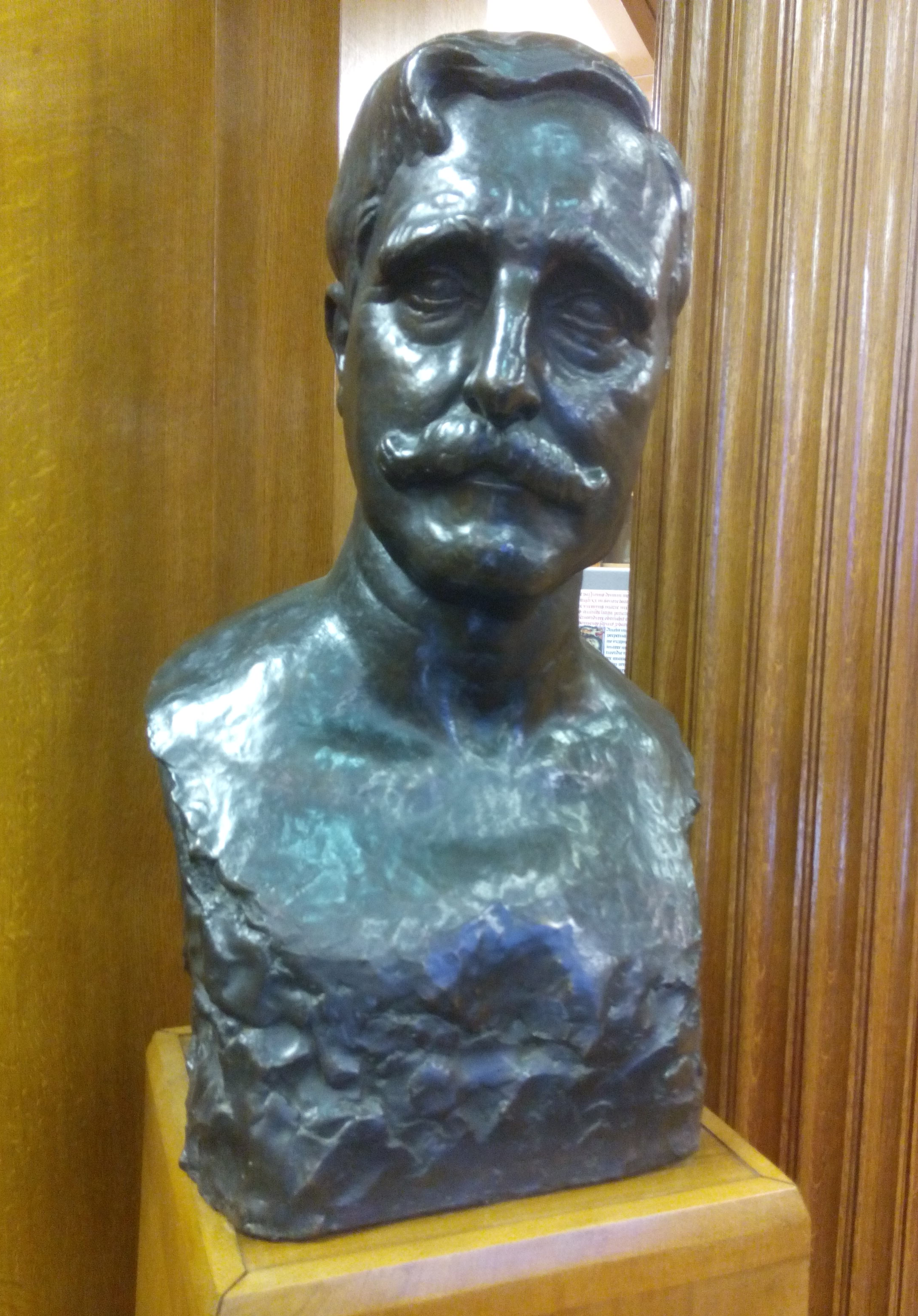
A bust of Edward Allen Brotherton, 1st Baron Brotherton, on display in the Brotherton Library, University of Leeds.

In the 1920s the University of Leeds had significant storage issues with its own collection of books. The library had outgrown its accommodation situated under the Great Hall, and books were scattered in around fifty different locations across the campus. In 1927 Brotherton donated £100,000 to the University of Leeds for a new library. On 24 June 1930, in one of his last public acts, he laid the foundation stone for the building, at the same time announcing that he would bequeath his collection of books and manuscripts to the university.

In a public declaration at the laying of the foundation stone he stated: '

As one who has spent the greater part of his life in Yorkshire, I am proud of our County; as a citizen of Leeds, I am proud of the city, and I believe in giving our young people the best chance to make its future even better than its past. I like to think that all students will have the opportunity to wander freely through the rooms of a great library. But a great library in a great University is a trust for the Nation at large, and should not be looked upon as exclusively available for its own students. I hope that in the course of time, this library building may be rich enough in books of all kinds to attract scholars from all parts of Great Britain and from countries abroad. It is my intention that this collection shall be housed in the new Library, and be held by the University in perpetual trust for the nation. It is my desire that access to the books shall be accorded to all properly accredited persons.

The Brotherton Library opened in 1936 and still houses his collection which includes 35,000 books, 400 manuscripts, 4,000 deeds and 30,000 letters. On his death Brotherton's will also revealed a further bequest of £100,000 to the university.

Brotherton’s significant donations to the new University included the endowment of a Chair in Bacteriology in 1922.

Today the Brotherton Circle honours the generosity of alumni and friends who include a gift to the University of Leeds in their will.

== Marriage and child ==
On 24 June 1882 Brotherton married Mary Jane Brookes, daughter of artist and designer Warwick Brookes. They lived together for only one year. Mary gave birth in May 1883, but her baby did not survive, and Mary died shortly after, in June. Brotherton never remarried and had no children, but he kept in contact with Mary's family for the rest of his life.

== Honours ==
Brotherton was created a Baronet, of Wakefield in the West Riding of the County of York, in 1918. He was raised to the peerage as Baron Brotherton of Wakefield in the County of York in 1929 for "political, public and charitable causes". As he had no son, both titles became extinct upon his death.

Escutcheon of the Brotherton baronets of Wakefield

== Death ==
Brotherton spent his later years at Roundhay Hall, Leeds (now Spire Leeds Hospital) and Kirkham Hall, Yorkshire where he died on 21 October 1930 at the age of 74. His burial at Lawnswood Cemetery, Leeds on 24 October 1930 was attended only by the male members of his family, at his stipulation.

In Dorothy Una Ratcliffe's statement to the Council of the University of Leeds concerning the Brotherton Library in 1933, she recalled her uncle's dying wish that his collection would occupy rooms in the University's new library and be held as a "trust for the Nation at large".

Parliament of the United Kingdom
Preceded by Viscount Milton	Member of Parliament for Wakefield; 1902–1910	Succeeded by Arthur Harold Marshall
Preceded by Arthur Harold Marshall	Member of Parliament for Wakefield; 1918–1922	Succeeded by Robert Ellis
Peerage of the United Kingdom
New creation	Baron Brotherton; 1929–1930	Extinct
Baronetage of the United Kingdom
New creation	Baronet (of Wakefield); 1918–1930	Extinct
