= Orr-Ewing baronets =

Set index for Orr-Ewing baronets

There have been two baronetcies created for members of the Orr-Ewing family, both in the Baronetage of the United Kingdom. As of 2026 both creations are extant.

- Orr-Ewing baronets of Ballikinrain and Lennoxbank (1886)
- Orr-Ewing baronets of Hendon (1963)
