= Green baronets of Wakefield (1886) =

Escutcheon of the Green baronets of Wakefield

The Green baronetcy, of Wakefield in the County of York, and of Ken Hill in the parish of Snettisham in the County of Norfolk, was created in the Baronetage of the United Kingdom on 5 March 1886 for Edward Green, Member of Parliament for Wakefield in 1874 and from 1888 to 1892.

The 2nd Baronet became involved in the Royal Baccarat Scandal of 1890. The 4th Baronet was a Deputy Lieutenant and High Sheriff of Norfolk in 1973, and a member of the Norfolk County Council.

== Green baronets, of Wakefield (1886) ==
- Sir Edward Green, 1st Baronet (1831–1923)
- Sir Edward Lycett Green, 2nd Baronet (1860–1940)
- Sir Edward Arthur Lycett Green, 3rd Baronet (1886–1941)
- Sir Edward Stephen Lycett Green, 4th Baronet (1910–1996)
- Sir Simon Lycett Green, 5th Baronet (1912–2003)
- Sir Edward Patrick Lycett Green, 6th Baronet (born 1950)

== Notes ==
Baronetage of the United Kingdom
Preceded by Brooks baronets	Green baronets of Wakefield; 5 March 1886	Succeeded by Paget baronets
