= John Charlesworth (politician) =

British politician and businessman

John Charlesworth JP

Member of Parliament for Wakefield
- In office 27 March 1857 – 28 April 1859

Personal details
- Born: 1815 Chapelthorpe Hall, Yorkshire
- Died: 21 March 1880 (aged 65) Chapelthorpe Hall, Yorkshire
- Party: Conservative
- Education: St John's College, Cambridge
- Occupation: Colliery owner

John Charlesworth Dodgson Charlesworth (1815 – 21 March 1880) was a British colliery owner and member of parliament for Wakefield between 1857 and 1859. Defeated by his Liberal opponent, William Henry Leatham at the 1859 general election both he and Leatham were subsequently found to have conducted extensive bribery during the campaign.

== Early life ==
Charlesworth was the son of John Dodgson Charlesworth of Chapelthorpe, Sandal, Wakefield. Baptised 20 August 1815, he was educated at Sedbergh School and St John's College, Cambridge, graduating from St John's with a BA in 1837 and an MA in 1840. In the 1841 census he is described as a coal master and residing in Chapelthorpe. By 1855 he had been appointed as a magistrate, moved to Woolgreaves Hall, and had purchased the shooting lodge at Grinton Lodge.

== Political career ==
Charlesworth was adopted as the Conservative candidate for Wakefield for the 1857 general election and in the absence of any other candidate, he was elected unopposed. Not a frequent speaker in the House of Commons, he spoke only three times in the two years he was an MP.

=== 1859 general election and subsequent corruption inquiry ===
At the 1859 he was re-adopted as the Conservative candidate but was on this occasion opposed by a Liberal candidate, William Henry Leatham. The polling was very close and when the result was announced Leatham won by three votes, 406 to 403. Following Leatham's victory, supporters of Charlesworth petitioned Parliament for the election to be declared void. Parliament's General Committee on Elections reported on 27 July that the election was void and that Leatham was, via his agents, guilty of bribery. The committee also resolved "That there is reason to believe that corrupt practices have extensively prevailed at the last election for the Borough of Wakefield". As a result of this finding a Commission was established to look into the alleged corruption. The Commission sat for three weeks between October and December 1859 and found that not only had Leatham conducted bribery on a large scale but so had Charlesworth. Leatham was found to have spent at least £3,900 and Charlesworth at least £4,150 on bribing voters. Charlesworth was also held to have hired several prize fighters for the dual purposes of exerting an improper influence on the election and causing intimidation to voters supporting Leatham. Between them, the two candidates bribed 142 of the 866 electors of the borough. No criminal proceedings followed but it ended Charlesworth's political career and the borough of Wakefield did not elect another MP until 1862.

== Later life ==
On 14 April 1847 at St Mary and St Cuthbert, Chester-le-Street, he married Sarah, daughter of Walker Featherstonhaugh. They had two sons, John Edward (born 1848) and Albany Hawke (1854–1914) and three daughters, Gertrude (born 1842), Catherine Sarah (born 1849) and Bertha Stobart (born 1851).

On the death of his father, Charlesworth inherited Chapelthorpe Hall and continued to live there, managing his colliery business until his death in 1880.

Parliament of the United Kingdom
Preceded by George Sandars	Member of Parliament for Wakefield; 1857 – 1859	Succeeded by William Henry Leatham
