= Paget baronets of Cranmore Hall (1886) =

Escutcheon of the Paget baronets of Cranmore Hall

The Paget baronetcy, of Cranmore Hall in the parish of East Cranmore in the County of Somerset, was created in the Baronetage of the United Kingdom on 6 March 1886 for the politician Richard Paget. He was Member of Parliament for East Somerset from 1865 to 1868, for Mid Somerset from 1868 to 1885 and for Wells from 1885 to 1895. The 2nd Baronet was married to Lady Muriel Paget.

== Paget baronets, of Cranmore Hall (1886) ==
- Sir Richard Horner Paget, 1st Baronet (1832–1908)
- Sir Richard Arthur Surtees Paget, 2nd Baronet (1869–1955)
- Sir John Starr Paget, 3rd Baronet (1914–1992)
- Sir Richard Herbert Paget, 4th Baronet (born 1957)

The heir presumptive is the present holder's brother David Vernon John Paget (born 1959).

== Extended family ==
Through his daughter Sylvia, Lady Chancellor (wife of Sir Christopher Chancellor) and her son John, the 2nd Baronet was great-grandfather to the actress Anna Chancellor.{

== Sources ==
- Mosley, Charles, ed. (2003). Burke's Peerage, Baronetage & Knighthood (107 ed.). Burke's Peerage & Gentry. p. 96. ISBN 0-9711966-2-1.

Baronetage of the United Kingdom
Preceded by Green baronets	Paget baronets of Cranmore Hall; 6 March 1886	Succeeded by Orr-Ewing baronets
