= George Sherwood (British politician) =

George Henry Sherwood (1878 – 10 October 1935) was a British Labour Party politician.

The son of a miner, Sherwood became a railway employee, and was Mayor of Wakefield.

He was elected at the 1923 general election as the Member of Parliament for Wakefield, but defeated in 1924. He regained the seat in 1929, but was defeated again in 1931.

Parliament of the United Kingdom
Preceded by Geoffrey Ellis	Member of Parliament for Wakefield; 1923 – 1924	Succeeded by Geoffrey Ellis
Preceded by Geoffrey Ellis	Member of Parliament for Wakefield; 1929 – 1931	Succeeded by George Hillman
