= 1902 Wakefield by-election =

UK Parliamentary by-election

The 1902 Wakefield by-election was a parliamentary by-election held on 25 March 1902 for the British House of Commons constituency of Wakefield. It was caused by the elevation to the peerage of the sitting member William Wentworth-Fitzwilliam, of the Conservative Party. The candidates were Edward Brotherton (Conservative) and Philip Snowden (Labour).

The by-election was won by Edward Brotherton of the Conservative Party.

== Result ==
1902 Wakefield by-election
Party	Candidate	Votes	%	±%
Conservative	Edward Brotherton	2,960	59.9	N/A
Labour Repr. Cmte.	Philip Snowden	1,979	40.1	New
Majority		981	19.8	N/A
Turnout		4,939	80.9	N/A
Registered electors		6,103		
Conservative hold		Swing	N/A	
