= Bishop Ullathorne Catholic School =

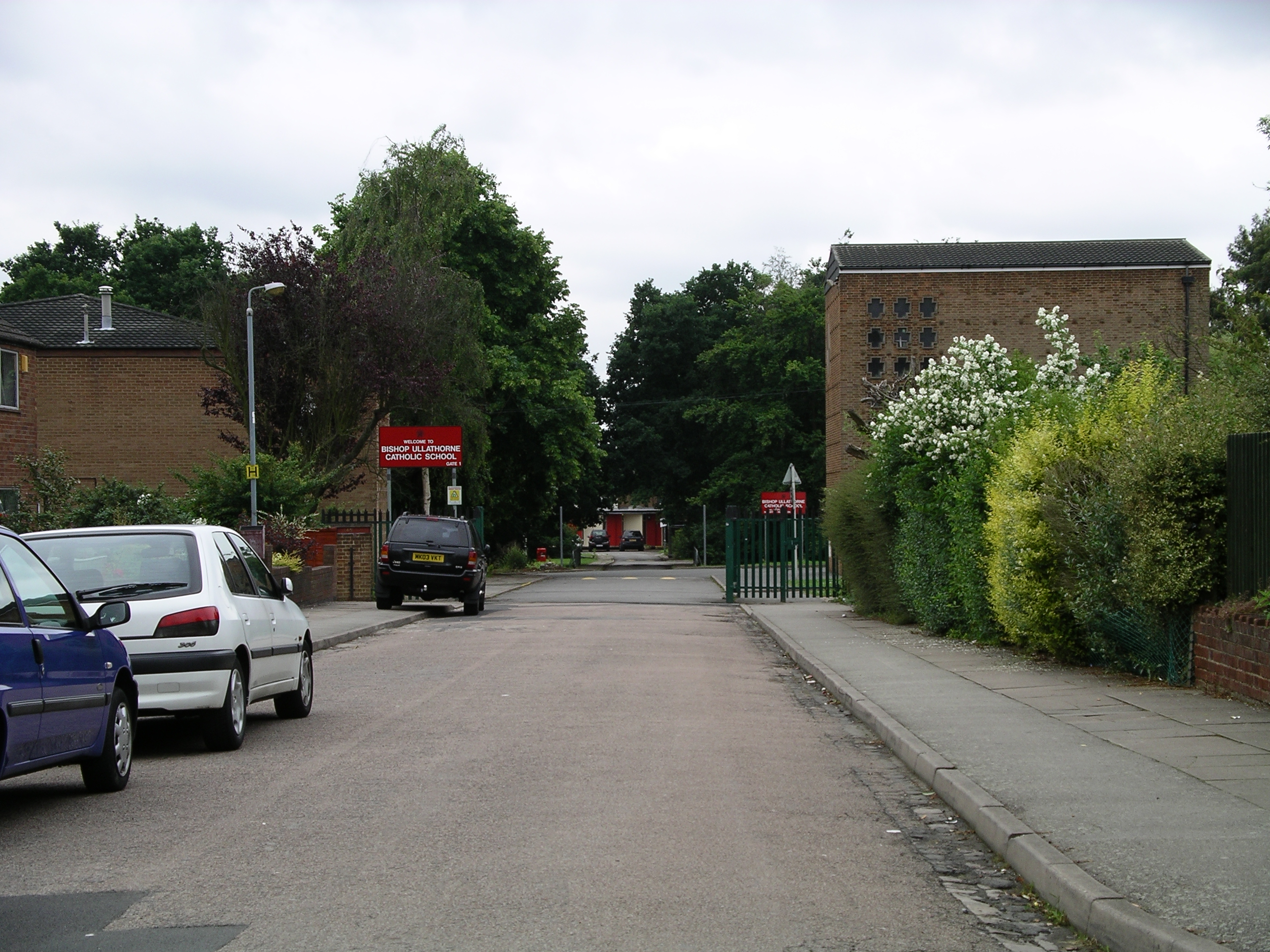

Location
- Leasowes Avenue; Coventry, West Midlands, CV3 6BH; England; 52.37903°N 1.53694°W

Information
- Type: Academy
- Motto: Soli Deo (For God Alone)
- Religious affiliation: Roman Catholic
- Established: 1953
- Local authority: Coventry City Council
- Trust: Holy Cross Catholic Multi Academy Company
- Specialist: Humanities
- Department for Education URN: 147345 Tables
- Ofsted: Reports
- Head teacher: Sarah Boyle
- Gender: Coeducational
- Age: 11 to 19
- Enrolment: 970 (approx.)
- Colour: Black Uniform. Black/Red tie. Sixth Form wears own clothes
- Website: http://www.bishopullathorne.co.uk

Bishop Ullathorne Catholic School is a Roman Catholic Academy in Coventry. The School was established in 1953 and in 2006 it was awarded specialist status as a Humanities College. The school is named after William Bernard Ullathorne (1806–1889), the first Roman Catholic Bishop of Birmingham.

Initially the school had three separate parts; a boys' secondary modern school, a girls' secondary modern school and a grammar school. In 1968 these formed the core of the current comprehensive school, each of the three separate parts being initially identified as the Lower School, the Middle School and the Upper School. The grammar school later became the home of the Coventry Centre for the Performing Arts before being sold to Bovis Homes who built a housing estate on the land.

The two remaining buildings were re-dubbed 'A Block' and 'B Block' after the sale of the grammar school and the previously empty space between them was built on to form a single building. This area is now a passage for staff and allows quick movement between the two structures, with students only being allowed access during heavy rainstorms or with special permission.

== Academics ==
The school currently has approximately 1400 pupils, and includes a sixth form college. In 2025, 74.2% of GCSE students achieved grade 4 or above in English and Maths, compared to the local authority average of 61.1% and the national average of 64.8% among state schools. Students come from a wide range of backgrounds as the school draws in Catholics from around the city. Around a third of students are eligible for free school meals and 17% learn English as a second language. It is consistently ranked within the top 10 schools in Coventry in local league tables.

== Sport ==
Although relatively small, the school has a rich history in sport, football, gymnastics, cross country and rugby. The school has won many Coventry Schools cups in football as well as winning the West Midlands Schools Cup.

In the past five years the school has been in The Coventry Evening Telegraph Cup final four times, winning it three times. A special win came in 2006 when it was the first final to be played at The Ricoh Arena, resulting in a 3–0 victory.

== Former pupils ==
- Andrew Campbell (b. 1959) – computer scientist
- Cathy Cassidy (b. 1962) – children's author
- Mary Creagh (b. 1967) – MP for Coventry East (Labour)
- Joel Fearon (b. 1988) – bobsleigher
- Theresa Griffin (b. 1962) – former Member of the European Parliament for the North West of England (Labour)
- Gary McSheffrey (b. 1982) – footballer
- Chris Moran (1956–2010) – Air Chief Marshal
- George Shaw (b. 1966) – artist and Turner Prize nominee
- Adam Walker (b. 1991) – footballer
