= Albany Charlesworth =

British Conservative Party politician

Albany Hawke Charlesworth (5 February 1854 – 12 September 1914) was a British Conservative Party politician.

He was the son of John Charlesworth.

== Parliamentary career ==
He unsuccessfully contested Normanton at the 1885 and 1886 general elections.

He was elected at the 1892 general election as the Member of Parliament for Wakefield, but did not stand again in 1895.

Parliament of the United Kingdom
Preceded by Edward Green	Member of Parliament for Wakefield; 1892 – 1895	Succeeded by Viscount Milton
