= David Hinchliffe =

British politician (born 1948)

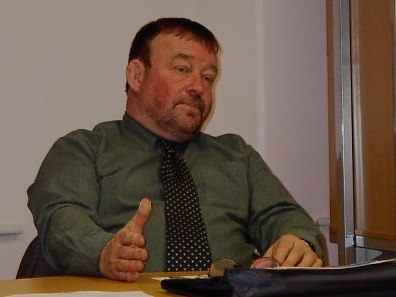
- Hinchliffe in 2002

Chair of the Health Select Committee
- In office 14 July 1997 – 11 April 2005
- Preceded by: Marion Roe
- Succeeded by: Kevin Barron

Member of Parliament for Wakefield
- In office 12 June 1987 – 11 April 2005
- Preceded by: Walter Harrison
- Succeeded by: Mary Creagh

Personal details
- Born: 14 October 1948 (age 77)
- Party: Labour
- Spouse: Julia North
- Education: University of Bradford

David Martin Hinchliffe (born 14 October 1948) is a British former Labour politician who was Member of Parliament for Wakefield from 1987 to 2005 when he stood down and was replaced by Mary Creagh.

== Early life ==
He went to Lawefield Lane Primary School, then Cathedral School (now Cathedral Academy) on Thornes Road in Wakefield. After Wakefield Technical College, he went to Leeds Polytechnic (now Leeds Beckett University) where he gained a Certificate of Qualification in Social Work in 1971. He gained an MA in Social Work and Community Work from the University of Bradford in 1978. He was a social worker in Leeds from 1968 to 1979. He was a Social Work tutor for Kirklees Council from 1980 to 1987. He played Rugby League from the age of 8, going up through all the ranks to Open-Age rugby. He was playing hooker for Walnut Warriors of Wakefield, against Rossington from Doncaster, when he was concussed and after a couple of days in hospital he retired from playing, aged 29.

== Parliamentary career ==
He was Chair of the Health Select Committee.

He was a founder and first secretary of the All-Party Parliamentary Rugby League Group in 1988.

Hinchliffe, along with the All-Party Group, campaigned against what he described as "one of the longest (and daftest) grievances in history" that meant anyone over the age of 18 associated with rugby league was banned forever from rugby union, himself included. With the Rugby League Group, he highlighted the lack of official recognition to rugby league in the form of Honours, was instrumental in the lifting of a ban on rugby league in the British armed forces in 1994 and helped the sport to expand beyond its heartlands more freely by exerting pressure on the Rugby Football Union to end its discrimination against even amateur league players.

In 1998 he led the enquiry by the Health Select Committee into "The Welfare of Former British Child Migrants" following the exposure of the scandal by Margaret Humphreys in her book "Empty Cradles". As a result of the report, in 2010 the UK Government issued an apology to all Child Migrants.

== Personal life ==
He married Julia North on 17 July 1982. They have a son, Robert (born October 1985) and a daughter, Rebecca (born May 1988).

Parliament of the United Kingdom
Preceded by Walter Harrison	Member of Parliament for Wakefield; 1987–2005	Succeeded by Mary Creagh
