= Walter Harrison (politician) =

British politician

The Right Honourable Walter Harrison PC
- Harrison when Deputy Chief Whip in the 1970s

Government Deputy Chief Whip in the House of Commons Treasurer of the Household
- In office 4 March 1974 – 4 May 1979
- Prime Minister: Harold Wilson; James Callaghan
- Preceded by: Bernard Weatherill
- Succeeded by: John Stradling Thomas

Opposition Deputy Chief Whip of the House of Commons
- In office 4 May 1979 – 11 November 1983
- Leader: James Callaghan; Michael Foot
- Preceded by: Bernard Weatherill
- Succeeded by: Norman Hogg
- In office June 1970 – 4 March 1974
- Leader: Harold Wilson
- Preceded by: Francis Pym
- Succeeded by: Bernard Weatherill

Member of Parliament for Wakefield
- In office 15 October 1964 – 18 May 1987
- Preceded by: Arthur Creech Jones
- Succeeded by: David Hinchliffe

Personal details
- Born: 2 January 1921 Wakefield, West Yorkshire, UK
- Died: 19 October 2012 (aged 91) Dewsbury, West Yorkshire, UK
- Party: Labour
- Spouses: Enid Coleman (m. 1948; died 1990); Jane Richards (m. 1991; died 2000)
- Children: 2

Walter Harrison PC (2 January 1921 – 19 October 2012) was a British Labour Party politician who was the Member of Parliament for Wakefield from 1964 to 1987.

== Background ==
Harrison was born in Dewsbury in 1921, where he was educated at Dewsbury Technical College and School of Art. His parents were socialists who were politically active. He served as an electrician in the Royal Air Force during World War II.

After the war, Harrison worked as a foreman electrician and was active in the Electrical Trades Union. He served as a councillor on West Riding County Council and as an alderman of Castleford Borough Council.

== Member of Parliament ==
Elected Labour MP for Wakefield in 1964, Harrison served as a Government whip from 1966 to 1970 and as deputy Chief Whip from 1974 to 1979. In the late 1970s, he was noted for his skill at helping preserve the Labour government as its small majority gradually vanished.

In 1968, Harrison was whipping on two bills simultaneously, trapping his leg in the door of a division lobby on the second vote; famously ruling that most of Harrison's body was in the lobby, the chairman of the bill committee declared the vote passed 22¾–22 in Labour's favour. In the Conservative landslide at the 1983 general election, he held his seat - which had undergone substantial boundary changes - with a majority of only 360 votes over the Conservative candidate.

He is accused of having "decked" the one-time Leader of Welsh Labour, Ron Davies, as a method of whipping up support for the leadership.

=== Role in 1979 vote of no confidence ===
On 28 March 1979, Harrison played a critical role in the defeat of the Labour government in the vote of confidence. As the vote loomed, Harrison approached Conservative MP Bernard Weatherill to enforce the convention and "gentlemen's agreement" that if a sick MP from the Government could not vote, an MP from the Opposition would abstain to compensate. The Labour MP Sir Alfred Broughton was on his deathbed and could not vote, meaning the Government would probably lose by one vote.

Weatherill said that the convention had never been intended for Matter of Confidence and it would be impossible to find a Conservative MP who would agree to abstain. However, after a moment's reflection, he offered that he himself would abstain, because he felt it would be dishonourable to break his word with Harrison. Harrison was so impressed by Weatherill's offer – which would have effectively ended his political career – that he released Weatherill from his obligation and so the Government fell by one vote on the agreement of gentlemen.

This episode was dramatised in James Graham's 2012 play This House (which opened one month before Harrison's death). When the play was first performed at the National Theatre, the part of Harrison was played by Philip Glenister.

== Personal life and death ==
In 1948, Harrison married Enid Coleman; they had two children and were married until her death in 1990. He was then married to Jane Richards, his former secretary, from 1991 until her death in 2000.

Harrison lived at Sandal Magna, near Wakefield, and died from heart failure at Pinderfields Hospital on 19 October 2012, aged 91.

== Sources ==
- Times Guide to the House of Commons, 1966 & 1983
- Leigh Rayment's Historical List of MPs

Parliament of the United Kingdom
Preceded by Arthur Creech Jones	Member of Parliament for Wakefield; 1964 – 1987	Succeeded by David Hinchliffe
Political offices
Preceded by Bernard Weatherill	Treasurer of the Household; 1974–1979	Succeeded by John Stradling Thomas
Party political offices
Preceded by Charles Morris	Labour Deputy Chief Whip in the House of Commons; 1970–1983	Succeeded by Norman Hogg
