= George Sandars =

British politician

Member of Parliament for Wakefield
- In office 30 July 1847 – 27 March 1857
- Preceded by: William Lascelles
- Succeeded by: John Charlesworth Dodgson-Charlesworth

Personal details
- Born: 2 October 1805 Gainsborough, West Lindsey District, England
- Died: 14 May 1879 (aged 73) Kent and Sussex Cemetery and Crematorium
- Party: Conservative
- Spouse: Arabella Walker

George Sandars (2 October 1805 – 14 May 1879) was a British Conservative politician. He was the son of Samuel and Jane Sandars.

== Parliamentary career ==
Sandars was first elected Conservative MP for Wakefield at the 1847 general election and held the seat until 1857 when he did not seek re-election.

== Marriage and Children ==
He married for the first time on 3 June 1829 to Mary Anne Neder(16 March 1808-, the daughter of George Neden of Cheetham.Together they had the following children:

- Jane Sanders (27 October 1830 – 5 March 1900)
- Mary Arabella Sanders (1847-1885)

On the 18th of February, he married for the second time, this time to Arabella Walker (29 October 1804 – 21 August 1887), the daughter of John Walker of Manchester.

Parliament of the United Kingdom
Preceded by William Lascelles	Member of Parliament for Wakefield; 1847–1857	Succeeded by John Charlesworth Dodgson-Charlesworth
