= Mary Creagh =

British politician (born 1967)

Mary Creagh CBE FCIL MP
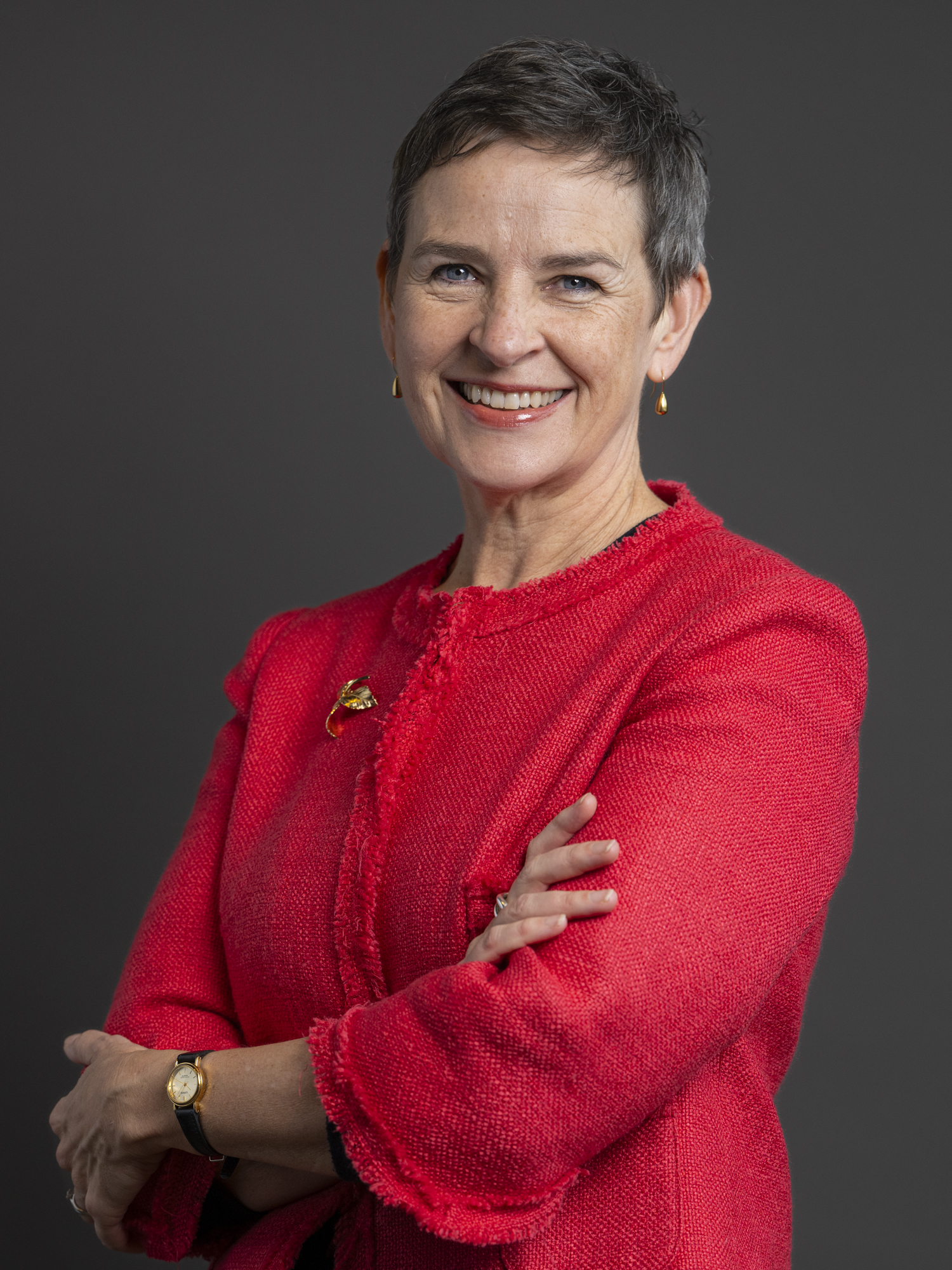
- Official portrait, 2024

Parliamentary Under-Secretary of State for Nature
- In office 18 July 2024 – 22 July 2026
- Prime Minister: Keir Starmer
- Preceded by: Rebecca Pow
- Succeeded by: Jenny Riddell-Carpenter

Chair of the Environmental Audit Committee
- In office 10 February 2016 – 6 November 2019
- Preceded by: Huw Irranca-Davies
- Succeeded by: Philip Dunne
Shadow cabinet portfolios
| 2014–2015 | International Development |
| 2013–2014 | Transport |
| 2010–2013 | Environment, Food and Rural Affairs |

Member of Parliament for Coventry East
- Incumbent
- Assumed office 4 July 2024
- Preceded by: Colleen Fletcher
- Majority: 11,623 (31.3%)

Member of Parliament for Wakefield
- In office 5 May 2005 – 6 November 2019
- Preceded by: David Hinchliffe
- Succeeded by: Imran Ahmad Khan

Member of Islington Council for Highbury West Highbury (1998–2002)
- In office 7 May 1998 – 5 May 2005
- Succeeded by: Theresa Debono

Personal details
- Born: Mary Helen Creagh; 2 December 1967 (age 58) Coventry, Warwickshire, England
- Party: Labour
- Education: Pembroke College, Oxford (MA); London School of Economics (PhD)

Mary Helen Creagh CBE FCIL (born 2 December 1967) is a British politician who has served as Member of Parliament (MP) for Coventry East since 2024, having previously served as MP for Wakefield from 2005 to 2019. A member of the Labour Party, she served as Parliamentary Under-Secretary of State for Nature from 2024 to 2026.

Creagh was born and raised in Coventry, Warwickshire, where she attended Bishop Ullathorne Roman Catholic School. She studied Modern Languages at Pembroke College, Oxford and European Studies at the London School of Economics. After interning in Brussels, she worked as a lecturer and charity trustee. She began her political career serving on Islington London Borough Council from 1998 to 2005. She moved to West Yorkshire after she was first elected as MP for Wakefield in the 2005 general election.

After Labour's defeat in 2010, Creagh was appointed to Ed Miliband's Shadow Cabinet as Shadow Secretary of State for Environment, Food and Rural Affairs. She was then moved to Shadow Transport Secretary in 2013 and Shadow International Development Secretary in 2014. Following Miliband's resignation, she announced she would run for Leader of the Labour Party in the 2015 leadership election although she later withdrew her candidacy. She resigned from the frontbench following the election as Labour leader of Jeremy Corbyn.

Creagh became chair of the Environmental Audit Select Committee in 2016 but lost her Wakefield seat to the Conservative Party candidate Imran Ahmad Khan at the 2019 general election. After losing her seat, she was appointed as chief executive of national walking charity Living Streets in September 2020.

== Early life and career ==
Of Irish descent, Creagh was born in Coventry, Warwickshire, where her father was a car factory worker and her mother a primary school teacher. She was educated at the comprehensive Bishop Ullathorne Roman Catholic School in Coventry and read Modern Languages at Pembroke College, Oxford, graduating as MA (Oxon). After pursuing European Studies at the London School of Economics (PhD), she worked in Brussels for four years, first as an intern at the European Parliament and then for the European Youth Forum. She lectured in entrepreneurship at the Cranfield School of Management and served for seven years as a trustee of national charity Rathbone.

== Political career ==
=== Councillor in Islington: 1998–2005 ===
Creagh was elected as a councillor for the London Borough of Islington in 1998, representing Highbury West ward (named Highbury from 1998 until 2002), and served as the Labour Group Leader for five years during a period when the party was in opposition locally. During this time, she knocked on doors and ran a campaign office for future party leader Jeremy Corbyn. She stood down from Islington Council in 2005 upon her election to parliament.

In 2002, Creagh formally alleged cronyism in the appointment of the Islington Council chief executive by five Liberal Democrat councillors, thus triggering an investigation by the Standards Board for England. After the longest-ever investigation by the Standards Board, her complaint was rejected. Creagh was criticised by the tribunal as being "heavily influenced by her political motives" and that she was an "insensitive witness, lacking in balanced judgment and one who was prepared to make assumptions about honesty and integrity of others without any proper basis". However, Creagh defended herself, saying she "blew the whistle because I believed the Liberal Democrats were not meeting the standards we expect from people in public office. I invite people to look at my evidence and draw their own conclusions". The Liberal Democrat councillors involved lost their seats at the 2006 elections when their party lost control of the council.

=== Backbencher and early posts: 2005–2010 ===
Creagh succeeded the retiring David Hinchliffe as MP for Wakefield. She won the seat in 2005 with a majority of 5,154. She made her maiden speech in parliament on 25 May 2005 using the occasion to raise issues of poverty in her constituency. She also mentioned locally-born sculptor Barbara Hepworth. Shortly after entering the House of Commons, she became a member of the Human Rights Select Committee, leaving the committee in 2007. She is a member of Labour Friends of Israel.

Creagh successfully introduced a Children's Food Bill in 2005 which sought to introduce minimum nutritional standards for all school meals and take fizzy drinks and sugary snacks out of school vending machines. Both of these measures were accepted by the government and became law under the Education and Inspections Act 2006.

In 2006, Creagh was made parliamentary private secretary (PPS) to Andy Burnham, Secretary of State for Culture, Media and Sport. In the 2007 Labour Party leadership election, she backed Gordon Brown. From 2007 to 2009, she was Chair of the Labour Movement for Europe succeeding Chris Bryant and being succeeded by Richard Corbett. In June 2009, she left her role as PPS to Burnham when she was appointed as an assistant government whip in the Department for Health. Between 2007 and 2010, she was the PPS to the Chief Secretary to the Treasury.

Creagh launched a campaign in 2006 aimed at preventing scalding injuries in the home. She brought together medical experts, campaign groups and victims of scalding injuries to lobby the government to change the building regulations to prevent people being severely scalded by hot water. The coalition pressured the government to make the fitting of a water temperature regulating device, such as a thermostatic mixing valve (TMV), compulsory in new bathrooms in England. In 2009, after a three-year "Hot Water Burns Like Fire" campaign, the Labour government confirmed TMVs were to be a standard fitment in all new bathrooms from April 2010.

In 2009, as Vice Chair of the All-Party Parliamentary Group for the Prevention of Genocide and Other Crimes Against Humanity, Creagh called on Justice Secretary Jack Straw to tighten British Law so people accused of genocide could be prosecuted in the UK. She said there was an "impunity gap" which allowed people accused of terrible crimes in places like Rwanda and Bosnia to escape justice and live freely in Britain. As a result of this, the government agreed to amend the Coroner's and Justice Bill to tighten the law so anyone suspected of war crimes anywhere throughout the world since 1991 and resident in the UK could be prosecuted in UK courts.

=== Shadow Cabinet: 2010–2015 ===
In the 2010 general election, Creagh held her Wakefield seat – altered by boundary changes – with a majority of 1,613 votes. She backed David Miliband in the 2010 Labour Party leadership election.

On 8 October 2010, Creagh was appointed Shadow Secretary of State for Environment, Food and Rural Affairs. In February 2011 she secured a House of Commons debate on the government's plans to sell off 85% of public forestry. The government subsequently abandoned these plans, it having become clear that the public "were not happy with the proposals". In 2011, Creagh criticised the decision by the Department for Environment, Food and Rural Affairs to cut flood defence spending in real terms by 32%. In addition to her involvement in campaigns calling for the banning of wild animals performing in circuses, she has opposed the government's policy of badger culling, claiming it was "anti-science" and that the option of vaccination should be explored. At the Labour Party's Annual Conference in September 2011, Creagh launched the campaign Back the Apple. with Unite the Union. The campaign opposes the government's plan to abolish the Agricultural Wages Board which sets wages and conditions for thousands of agricultural workers.

In 2013, Creagh was appointed Shadow Secretary of State for Transport. On 24 March 2014 she and Jamie Hanley opposed the train fares price increases in New Pudsey proposed by Patrick McLoughlin. The opposition spread throughout 18 West Yorkshire stations, forcing McLoughlin to scrap the plan. The same day she took part in the minibus opening ceremony which was hosted by Colchester Community Volunteer Service and two days later accused the government of donating their time into privatising East Coast Main Line instead of worrying about high fare prices.

In November 2014, Creagh became Shadow Secretary of State for International Development in Ed Miliband's final reshuffle prior to the 2015 general election.

=== 2015 Labour Party leadership election ===
On 14 May 2015, Creagh announced her candidacy for Leader of the Labour Party after Ed Miliband's resignation following Labour's general election defeat. On 12 June, Creagh announced that she was withdrawing from the leadership contest. At the time of her announcement, she had secured about 10 nominations from Labour MPs, fewer than any of the other remaining candidates and well short of the 35 required to take part in the final ballot. After the election of Jeremy Corbyn as Labour leader in September 2015, Creagh resigned from the frontbench.

=== Return to the backbenches: 2015–2019 ===
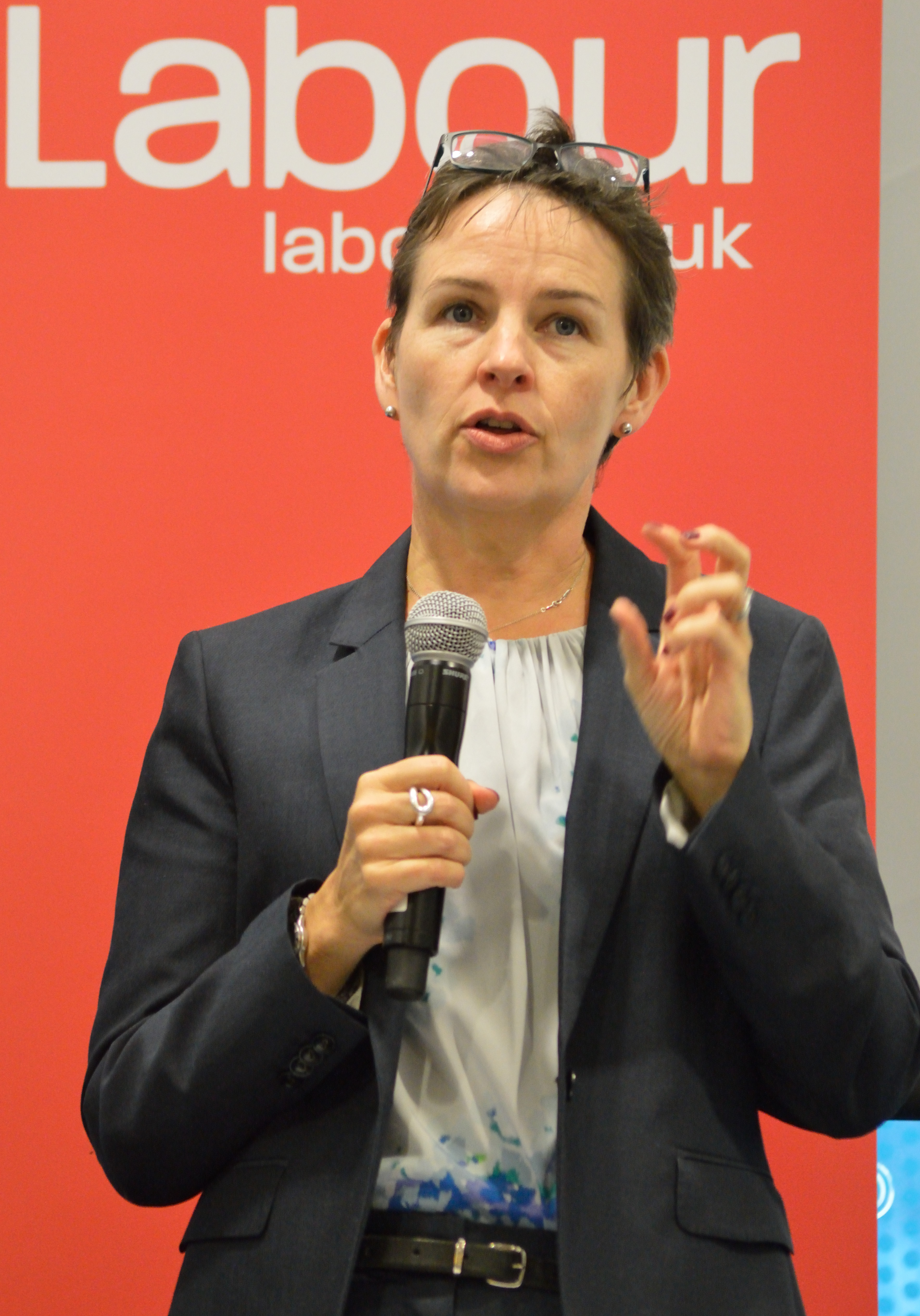
Creagh speaking at a 2016 Labour Party Conference fringe meeting

On the 1 December 2015 edition of BBC programme Newsnight, Creagh argued in favour of military action in Syria, stating: "ISIL pose a clear threat to Britain", "it makes no sense to turn our planes back at the Syrian border" and "we must act to keep our country safe".

In February 2016, Creagh became chair of the Environmental Audit Committee. During the 2016 EU referendum, she supported the UK remaining in the European Union, while her constituency voted in favour of Brexit. She supported Owen Smith in the failed attempt to replace Jeremy Corbyn in the 2016 Labour Party leadership election.

Creagh voted against the triggering of Article 50 in February 2017. She went on to state blue passports were "not worth £50 billion and crashing the economy" and the UK leaving the EU would be bad for the planet, and "more than the harm" done by Donald Trump. In 2017, a constituent was jailed for harassment after sending Creagh far-right influenced material. Creagh's security later was stepped up after property damage and a "credible threat" in relation to her opposition to Brexit.

During the 2017 general election, Creagh was reported as writing to constituents to say that her team had been "speaking to people in your street" who had told them they had "more confidence in Theresa May as Prime Minister than Jeremy Corbyn", predicted a large Tory majority and called for a vote for them as individuals while promising to "work for a Labour Party that can once again regain your confidence." The letter was similar to ones sent by Joan Ryan and Gavin Shuker.

In November 2018, Creagh expressed sympathy for Labour MP Angela Smith after Smith's Constituency Labour Party passed a vote of no confidence in her. In February 2019, Creagh was invited to join breakaway Labour MPs when they formed The Independent Group, later Change UK, but declined.

In June 2019, Creagh called on the Labour Party to express "full-throated support" for a second EU referendum. She was later defeated at the 2019 general election by the Conservative candidate Imran Ahmad Khan. In an interview with Channel 4 News, Ahmad Khan attributed his success during the election to "Islington Remainers" who had branded Leave voters "stupid, uneducated, racist or wrong". Ahmad Khan was later was forced to resign the seat after being convicted of sexual offences against a child.

=== Return to Parliament: 2024–present ===
Creagh launched her campaign to be selected as Labour candidate for Coventry North East in January 2023. In April 2024, she was chosen to contest the redrawn seat of Coventry East at the 2024 general election. She won the seat with a majority 11,623 votes.

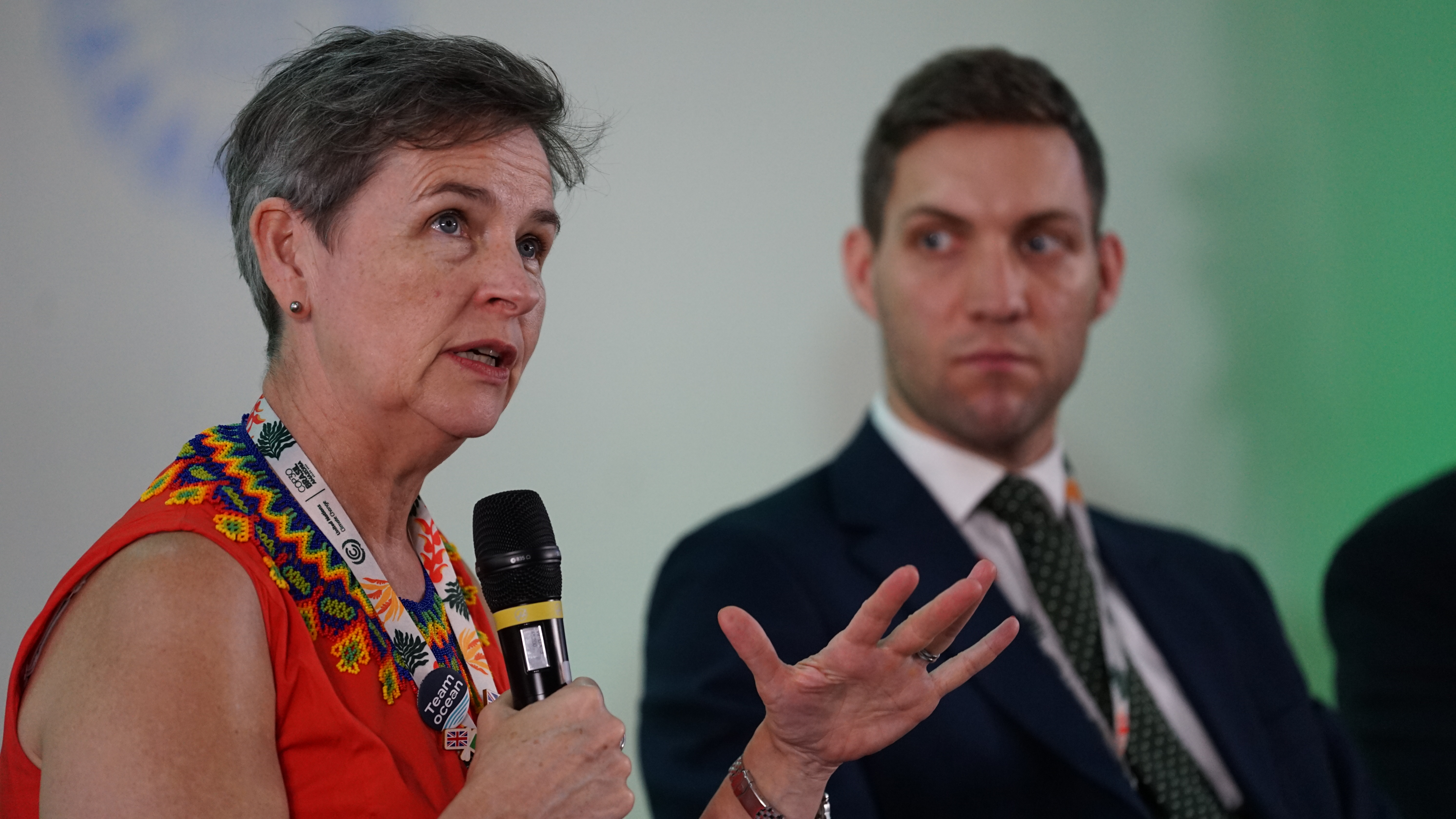
Creagh speaking at COP30 in Belém, Brazil (2025)

In March 2025, as Parliamentary Under-Secretary of State for Nature, Creagh saw the first legal wild beaver release in England at England's first super national nature reserve at Purbeck, Dorset.

In July 2026, Creagh left the government after Andy Burnham became the Prime Minister.

== Later career ==
Creagh is working as a visiting professor at Cranfield University and has given speeches for the OECD in Paris and Chatham House in Tokyo. She also volunteers at her local foodbank.

In June 2020, it was announced that she would become chief executive of Living Streets, a British charity for pedestrians, effective September 2020.

She was appointed Commander of the Order of the British Empire (CBE) in the 2021 Birthday Honours for parliamentary and political services.

== Personal life ==
Creagh married Adrian Pulham in 2001. They have a son and a daughter. She is a keen cyclist.

Parliament of the United Kingdom
| Preceded by David Hinchliffe | Member of Parliament for Wakefield; 2005–2019 | Succeeded by Imran Ahmad Khan |
| New constituency | Member of Parliament for Coventry East; 2024–present | Incumbent |
Political offices
| Preceded by Hilary Benn | Shadow Secretary of State for Environment, Food and Rural Affairs; 2010–2013 | Succeeded by Maria Eagle |
| Preceded by Maria Eagle | Shadow Secretary of State for Transport; 2013–2014 | Succeeded by Michael Dugher |
| Preceded by Jim Murphy | Shadow Secretary of State for International Development; 2014–2015 | Succeeded by Diane Abbott |
