= Sir Geoffrey Ellis, 1st Baronet =

British politician (1874–1956)

Sir Geoffery Ellis Bt
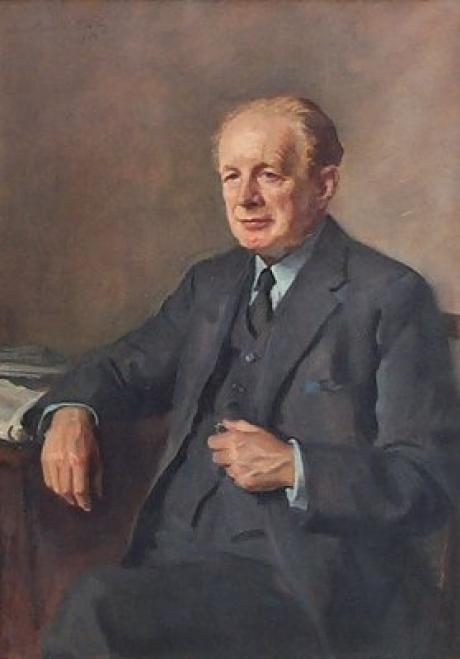
- 1950 portrait of Ellis by Sir Oswald Birley

Member of Parliament for Winchester
- In office 27 October 1931 – 25 October 1935
- Preceded by: George Hennessy
- Succeeded by: Gerald Palmer

Member of Parliament for Wakefield
- In office 29 October 1924 – 10 May 1929
- Preceded by: George Sherwood
- Succeeded by: George Sherwood
- In office 15 November 1922 – 16 November 1923
- Preceded by: Edward Brotherton
- Succeeded by: George Sherwood

Personal details
- Born: Robert Geoffery Ellis; 4 September 1874 Shipley, West Yorkshire
- Died: 28 July 1956 (aged 81)
- Party: Conservative

Sir Robert Geoffrey Ellis, 1st Baronet (4 September 1874 in Shipley, West Yorkshire – 28 July 1956) was a Conservative Party politician in the United Kingdom.

Ellis was educated at Peterhouse, Cambridge. He was elected as Member of Parliament (MP) for Wakefield at the 1922 general election, but lost the seat at the 1923 general election. He was re-elected in 1924, but defeated again in 1929.

Ellis did not contest Wakefield again, but at the 1931 general election he was returned as MP for Winchester. At the 1935 general election, he did not stand again in Winchester, but was elected instead for the Conservative safe seat of Sheffield Ecclesall. He retired from the House of Commons at the 1945 general election.

He was made a baronet, of Threshfield in the West Riding of the County of York, in 1932.

== See also ==
- Craig, F. W. S. (1983) [1969]. British parliamentary election results 1918-1949 (3rd ed.). Chichester: Parliamentary Research Services. ISBN 0-900178-06-X.
- Leigh Rayment's list of baronets
- Leigh Rayment's Historical List of MPs

Parliament of the United Kingdom
Preceded by Edward Brotherton	Member of Parliament for Wakefield; 1922–1923	Succeeded by George Sherwood
Preceded by George Sherwood	Member of Parliament for Wakefield; 1924–1929	Succeeded by George Sherwood
Preceded by Sir George Hennessy	Member of Parliament for Winchester; 1931–1935	Succeeded by Gerald Palmer
Preceded by Sir Samuel Roberts, Bt	Member of Parliament for Sheffield Ecclesall; 1935–1945	Succeeded by Peter Roberts
Baronetage of the United Kingdom
New creation	Baronet (of Threshfield); 1932–1956	extinct
