= West Riding Proprietary School =

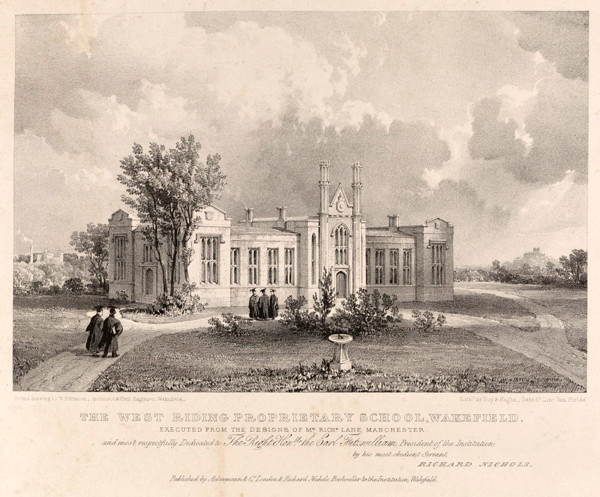
West Riding Proprietary School, 1830 design

The West Riding Proprietary School was a grammar school in Northgate, Wakefield, West Riding of Yorkshire that opened in 1834. It was also known as Wakefield Proprietary School, or ambiguously as Wakefield Grammar School. After falling rolls and fire damage, it closed around the beginning of 1854.

== History ==
The foundation stone was laid by John Savile, 3rd Earl of Mexborough on 6 February 1833. The school was built in 1833–4 to a Tudor Gothic design by Richard Lane, and was opened by Earl Fitzwilliam on 6 August 1834.

== Principals ==
- 1834–1839 George Ash Butterton
- 1839–1843 Samuel Fennell
- 1843–1848 Richard Garvey
- 1848–1852 Charles Frederick Stroehlin Weidemann
- 1853–1855 Ebenezer Bates B.A. (Dublin).

== Alumni ==
- John Bacchus Dykes, cleric and hymnwriter
- Sir Edward Green, 1st Baronet, railway executive and politician
- Thomas Archer Hirst, mathematician
- James Kitson, 1st Baron Airedale, industrialist and politician
- Thomas Kemp Sanderson, merchant and politician
- Matthew William Thompson, railway executive and politician
- Frederick Walton, industrialist and inventor
- William St James Wheelhouse, barrister and politician
- William Spicer Wood (died 1902), headmaster of Oakham School

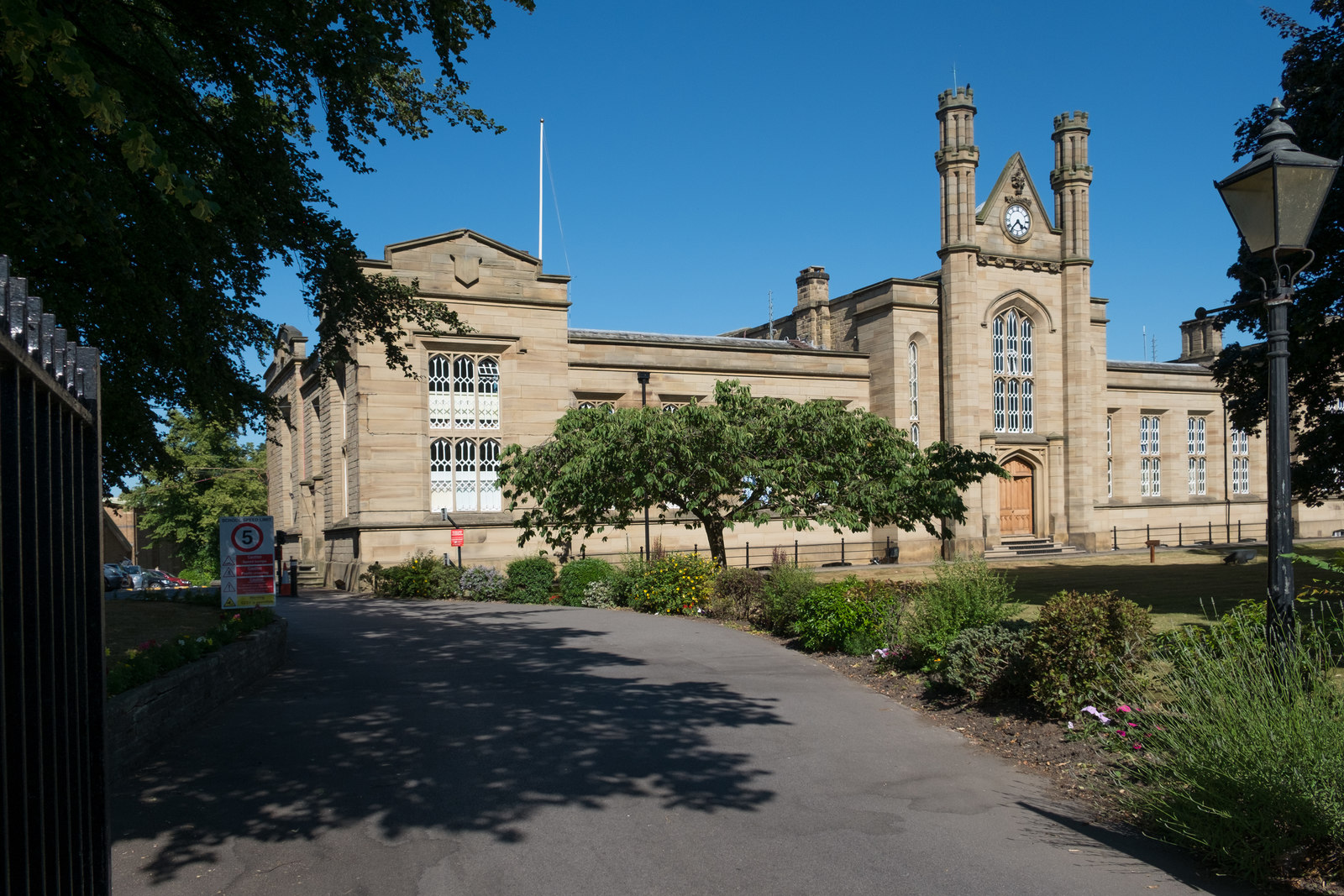
Richard Lane's 1834 building at Northgate, Wakefield for the West Riding Proprietary School, now part of the Queen Elizabeth Grammar School, Wakefield, 2018 photograph

== 1854 ==
While it is not quite clear how the school ended, local newspaper reports indicate:

1. At the beginning of the year, Ebenezer Bates relaunched the school with a former colleague from the Blackheath Proprietary School.
2. In March, another school in Westgate, Wakefield, the Galway House academy, led a by a former master from the school called Laurence, had attracted a number of other members of its staff.
3. In July Bates in an advertisement for the school is described as "who has now the entire direction of this Establishment".
4. A correspondent for Galway House in December spoke of staff who had been at West Riding Proprietary School from the start until "it finally ceased to be a school under the management of the directors."

Bates became a curate at Wold Newton, Lincolnshire, and died in 1866.
