= Orr-Ewing baronets of Hendon (1963) =

The Orr-Ewing baronetcy, of Hendon in the County of Middlesex, was created on 27 June 1963 for the politician Ian Orr-Ewing, Member of Parliament for Hendon from 1950 to 1970. He was the grandson of John Orr-Ewing, fourth son of the 1st Baronet of the first creation. In 1970 he was created a life peer as Baron Orr-Ewing, of Little Berkhamsted in the County of Hertford. He was succeeded in the baronetcy by his son, the 2nd Baronet.

== Orr-Ewing baronets, of Hendon (1963) ==
- Sir (Charles) Ian Orr-Ewing, 1st Baronet (1912–1999) (from 1971 Baron Orr-Ewing)
- Sir Alistair Simon Orr-Ewing, 2nd Baronet (1940–2024)
- Sir Archie Cameron Orr-Ewing, 3rd Baronet (born 1969)

The heir apparent is the present holder's son, Alfred Charles Orr-Ewing (born 1999).
