= William Lascelles =

British politician

The Right Honourable William Lascelles PC
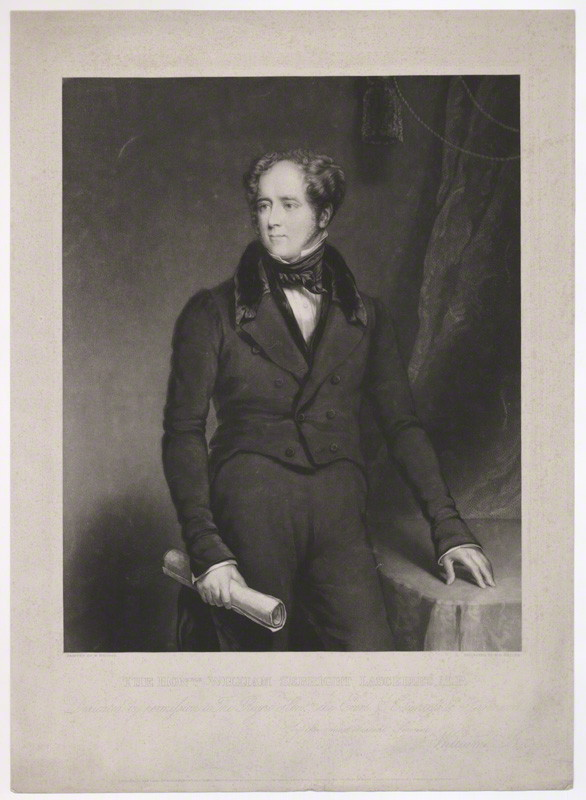

Comptroller of the Household
- In office 23 July 1847 – 2 July 1851
- Monarch: Victoria
- Prime Minister: Lord John Russell
- Preceded by: Lord Marcus Hill
- Succeeded by: Earl of Mulgrave

Personal details
- Born: 29 October 1798
- Died: 2 July 1851 (aged 52)
- Party: Whig
- Spouse: Lady Caroline Howard (m. 1823)
- Children: 10, including Frank
- Parent(s): Henry Lascelles, 2nd Earl of Harewood; Henrietta Sebright

William Saunders Sebright Lascelles PC (29 October 1798 – 2 July 1851) was a British Whig politician. He served as Comptroller of the Household from 1847 to 1851.

== Background ==
Lascelles was the third son of Henry Lascelles, 2nd Earl of Harewood and his wife Henrietta Sebright, daughter of Lieutenant-General Sir John Sebright, 6th Baronet. Edward Lascelles (1796–1839, Viscount Lascelles 1820–1839), Henry Lascelles, 3rd Earl of Harewood, and Edwin Lascelles were his brothers.

== Political career ==
Lascelles was returned to Parliament for East Looe in 1826, a seat he held until 1830. He was subsequently MP for Northallerton from 1831 to 1832, for Wakefield from 1837 to 1841 and from 1842 to 1847 and for Knaresborough from 1847 to 1851. In 1847 he was sworn of the Privy Council and appointed Comptroller of the Household under Lord John Russell, a post he held until his death in 1851.

== Cricket ==
Lascelles played in 1818. He is recorded in one match for E. H. Budd's XI, totalling 1 run with a highest score of 1.

== Family ==
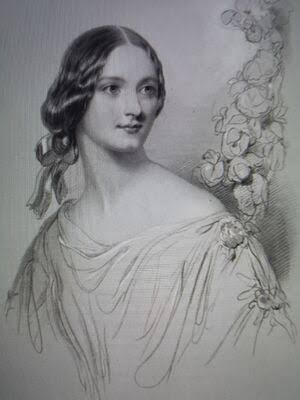
Lady Caroline Georgiana Lascelles (née Howard) (1803-1881)

Lascelles married Lady Caroline Georgiana Howard (d. 1881), daughter of George Howard, 6th Earl of Carlisle, on 14 May 1823. They had ten children:

- Georgiana Caroline Lascelles (1826–1911), married Charles Grenfell, a grandson of William Molyneux, 2nd Earl of Sefton and had issue.
- George Dacre Lascelles (1828–1829)
- Henrietta Frances Lascelles (1830–1884), married William Cavendish, 2nd Baron Chesham and had issue.
- Major Claude George William Lascelles (1831–1903), died unmarried.
- Edwin Agar Lascelles (1833–1877), died unmarried.
- Mary Louise Lascelles (c. 1835–1917), died unmarried.
- Emma Elizabeth Lascelles (1838–1920), married Lord Edward Cavendish, son of William Cavendish, 7th Duke of Devonshire and had issue.
- Sir Frank Cavendish Lascelles (1841–1920), married Mary Emma Olliffe and had issue.
- Lieutenant-Colonel Henry Arthur Lascelles (1842–1913), married Caroline Maria Gore, sister of Charles Gore and had issue, including Sir Francis William Lascelles.
- Beatrice Blanche Lascelles (1844–1915), married Frederick Temple, Archbishop of Canterbury.

Lascelles died on 2 July 1851, aged 52. Lady Caroline Lascelles died in November 1881.

Parliament of the United Kingdom
| Preceded by Thomas Potter Macqueen; Lord Perceval | Member of Parliament for East Looe; 1826–1830; With: James Buller-Elphinstone 1826–1829; Henry Thomas Hope 1829–1830 | Succeeded by Henry Thomas Hope; Thomas Arthur Kemmis |
| Preceded by Viscount Lascelles; Sir John Beresford, Bt | Member of Parliament for Northallerton; 1831–1832; With: Sir John Beresford, Bt | Succeeded by John George Boss |
| Preceded by Daniel Gaskell | Member of Parliament for Wakefield; 1837–1841 | Succeeded by Joseph Holdsworth |
| Preceded by Joseph Holdsworth | Member of Parliament for Wakefield; 1842–1847 | Succeeded by George Sandars |
| Preceded by Andrew Lawson; William Ferrand | Member of Parliament for Knaresborough; 1847–1851; With: Joshua Westhead | Succeeded by Joshua Westhead; Thomas Collins |
Political offices
| Preceded by Lord Marcus Hill | Comptroller of the Household; 1847–1851 | Succeeded by The Earl of Mulgrave |
