= Daniel Gaskell =

British Liberal Party politician

Daniel Gaskell (11 September 1782 – 20 December 1875) was a British Liberal Party politician.

He was elected at the 1832 general election as the Member of Parliament (MP) for the newly enfranchised borough of Wakefield in the West Riding of Yorkshire. He claimed to have attached himself to no party and often voted with Radical and Irish MPs. This prompted joint Whig Conservative opposition at subsequent elections. He was re-elected in 1835, at the same election that returned his nephew, James Milnes Gaskell as M.P. for Wenlock.

He held the seat until his defeat at the 1837 general election by the Conservative Party candidate William Lascelles.

He was President of Manchester College, York (now Harris Manchester College, Oxford) from 1829 to 1834.

Gaskell, whose home was at Lupset Hall, Yorkshire, was a generous benefactor to the local area. In 1842 he purchased land in the nearby village of Horbury and built a school to ensure that the children of Horbury's poor were provided with elementary education free of charge. He contributed £3,000 towards new premises for the Wakefield Mechanics' Institute in 1855 and in 1865 donated £1,000 to assist poorer Unitarian congregations in the north of England. He died in 1875 aged ninety-three. There is a monument to him in the Westgate Unitarian Chapel, in Wakefield. He bequeathed the school in Horbury, together with £1,000 LNER railway stock to be used for its upkeep to the trustees of Westgate Unitarian Chapel. The school was to have no particular religious opinions and was to provide education for 'those poor children in Horbury whose parents....could afford to pay only a small sum for their education'. The school provided elementary education until 1887 when it could no longer be adapted to meet the Board of Education requirements and Horbury had four other elementary schools established under the Elementary Education Act 1870, providing secular education. The eventual sale of the school and land provided assets for the Daniel Gaskell Foundation, a charity which has evolved with changes in education provision and continues to this day. Its purpose since 1986 is to promote the education of persons under the age of 25 who are resident in the area of the former Urban District of Horbury. To this end it contributes to the provision of prizes in the local schools, makes grants towards the costs of Outward Bound courses and make grants to local students attending university.

Parliament of the United Kingdom
New constituency	Member of Parliament for Wakefield; 1832–1837	Succeeded by William Lascelles
