= Robert Bownas Mackie =

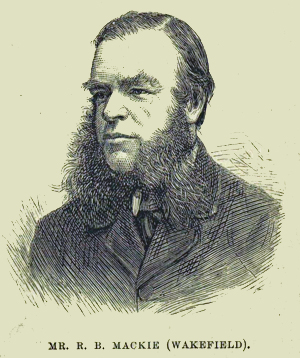
Mackie in 1880

Robert Bownas Mackie (25 Aug 1829 – 18 June 1885) was an English corn merchant and Liberal Party politician who sat in the House of Commons from 1880 to 1885.

== Background ==
Mackie was the son of Robert J Mackie of St John's Wakefield. He was educated at Wesley College, Sheffield and became a partner in the firm of Robert Mackie and Sons, corn merchants. He was a J.P. for the West Riding of Yorkshire. His brother was John Mackie, J.P. (1836–1891), benefactor of the Crigglestone area, whose wife dedicated the Church of St John the Divine, Calder Grove in his honour. R.B. Mackie married Fanny Shaw daughter of William Shaw of Stanley Hall, Wakefield in 1852.

== Political career ==
In 1874 Mackie stood unsuccessfully for parliament at Wakefield. At the 1880 general election he was elected Member of Parliament for Wakefield. He held the seat until his death at the age of 65 in 1885.

== Popular culture ==
Mackie was a friend of Wakefield chemist Thomas Waller Gissing, whose son was the novelist George Gissing. George Gissing characterises Mackie as the Dunford Member of Parliament Mr Baxendale, in his novel A Life's Morning (1888).

Parliament of the United Kingdom
Preceded by Thomas Kemp Sanderson	Member of Parliament for Wakefield; 1880 – 1885	Succeeded by Edward Green
