= George Hillman =

British politician

George Brown Hillman MBE (5 July 1867 – 19 March 1932) was a surgeon and briefly the Conservative MP for Wakefield.

Hillman was born in Halifax in 1867, the son of the Independent Minister Rev S.D. Hillman. After attending Ilkley High School, he qualified in medicine at University of Leeds Medical Department. He qualified as a Licentiate of the Society of Apothecaries in 1892, and practiced in the Castleford and Wakefield areas of the West Riding of Yorkshire.

He served in the Royal Army Medical Corps during the First World War, being promoted to Hon. Captain on 31 July 1917, and was Officer-in-Charge of the Spinola and Hamrun military hospitals in Malta and medical officer of Ledston Hall Auxiliary Hospital in Yorkshire. He was awarded the MBE for his services.

From 1918, Hillman was Chairman of the West Riding of Yorkshire Local Medical Panel Committee. He was Conservative candidate for Normanton in the 1923 general election. He served on Wakefield County Borough council from 1926, and was Mayor of Wakefield for the municipal year 1927–28. He was Leader of the Conservative group on the council.

Hillman was elected MP for Wakefield in the 1931 general election, defeating the incumbent Labour MP, George Henry Sherwood, by 4,107 votes. Hillman was 64 years old when elected. He did not serve long as an MP. After suffering from heart trouble, he died of bronchitis in March 1932. He had asked five questions but did not make a speech in Parliament.

== See also ==
- List of United Kingdom MPs with the shortest service

Parliament of the United Kingdom
Preceded by George Sherwood	Member of Parliament for Wakefield; 1931–1932	Succeeded by Arthur Greenwood
