= Joseph Holdsworth =

British Whig politician (1789–1857)

Member of Parliament for Wakefield
- In office 3 July 1841 – 21 April 1842
- Preceded by: William Lascelles
- Succeeded by: William Lascelles

Personal details
- Born: 6 December 1789
- Died: 18 April 1857 (aged 67)
- Party: Whig

Joseph Holdsworth (6 December 1789 – 18 April 1857) was a British Whig politician.

Holdsworth was elected a Whig Member of Parliament for Wakefield at the 1841 general election but, as he was also the returning officer at that election, he was unseated the next year in favour of his Conservative opponent, William Lascelles.

Parliament of the United Kingdom
Preceded by William Lascelles	Member of Parliament for Wakefield; 1841–1842	Succeeded by William Lascelles
