= Thomas Kemp Sanderson =

English politician

Thomas Kemp Sanderson (c.1 January 1821 – 24 December 1897) was an English corn merchant from Wakefield in the West Riding of Yorkshire, and a Conservative Party politician.

== Early life ==
He was born at Newmarket, Suffolk, the eldest son in a family of five sons and four daughters of Michael Sanderson of Pocklington and his wife Elizabeth Kemp, daughter of Thomas Kemp of Newmillerdam. He was educated at the West Riding Proprietary School. He went into business as a maltster in the family firm Michael Sanderson & Son.

== In politics ==
Sanderson unsuccessfully contested Wakefield at the 1868 general election, when he was beaten by the Liberal Party candidate Somerset Beaumont.

In 1874 Sanderson did not stand, when the Conservative candidate Edward Green defeated Beaumont. However, Green's election was voided on petition (due to bribery), and at the resulting by-election in May 1874, he won the seat. He was defeated at the 1880 general election by the Liberal candidate Robert Bownas Mackie, another local corn merchant, whom Sanderson had defeated in 1874. He did not stand again.

== Later life ==
From 1893 Sanderson lived with his brother Michael Edwin Sanderson at Kettlethorpe Hall. He died unmarried, and at his death he left £57,359, with Michael as executor and residual legatee. In 1898 a stained-glass window was dedicated to Sanderson on the north side of Wakefield Cathedral, to a design by Charles Eamer Kempe.

Parliament of the United Kingdom
Preceded by Edward Green	Member of Parliament for Wakefield; 1874 – 1880	Succeeded by Robert Bownas Mackie
