= Ron Benson =

English footballer (1925–1997)

Personal information
- Full name: Ronald Benson
- Date of birth: 26 March 1925
- Place of birth: Acomb, England
- Date of death: 6 November 1997 (aged 72)
- Place of death: York, North Yorkshire, England
- Height: 5 ft 8 in (1.73 m)
- Position: Winger

Senior career*
Years	Team	Apps	(Gls)
- Archbishop Holgates Old Boys
1947–1950	York City	20	(3)
1950–	Frickley Colliery		
Total		20	(3)
- * Club domestic league appearances and goals

Ronald Benson (26 March 1925 – 6 November 1997) was an English professional footballer who played as a winger in the Football League for York City, and in non-League football for Archbishop Holgates Old Boys and Frickley Colliery. After retiring he became a union representative in the British Rail workshops in York, and stood as the Conservative Party candidate for Wakefield in the 1966 general election, in which he was defeated by the Labour Party candidate.
