= Sir Edward Green, 1st Baronet =

English ironmaster and a Conservative politician (1831–1923)

Sir Edward Green, 1st Baronet (4 March 1831 – 30 March 1923) was an English ironmaster and a Conservative politician who sat in the House of Commons between 1885 and 1892.

== Life ==
Green was the son of Edward Green (engineer), a Yorkshire ironmaster who founded E. Green & Son based in Wakefield and patented "Green's Economiser". This was a device for recycling heat from boilers that previously went to waste.

Green was educated at West Riding Proprietary School and in Germany, and became an engineer in his father's business. He served in the 1st West Yorkshire Yeomanry as a lieutenant and later captain. In 1865, he and his wife leased Heath Old Hall, an Elizabethan House near Wakefield which they set about developing and furnishing. In 1877, Green purchased the Snettisham Estate in North West Norfolk, and built a new house, Ken Hill, primarily as a shooting lodge. Green became a director of the Lancashire and Yorkshire Railway and was a JP for the West Riding of Yorkshire and for Norfolk. Between 1874 and 1878, Green was a Governor of Wakefield Grammar School.

In the 1874 general election, Green was elected as Member of Parliament (MP) for Wakefield, but he was unseated on petition. In 1880, he stood in Pontefract, but was not elected. He returned to Wakefield at a by-election in July 1885, and won the seat, holding it until he stood down from the House of Commons at the 1892 general election. On 5 March 1886, he was created a Baronet 'of Wakefield and Ken Hill'.

== Family ==
Green in 1859 married Mary Lycett, daughter of William Edward Lycett of Bowdon, Cheshire, introducing the name Lycett into the family. Lady Green died in King's Lynn on 7 November 1902, in her 67th year. The couple had two sons:

- The elder son Edward Lycett Green (born 1860) achieved notoriety when he was involved in the Royal Baccarat Scandal of 1890. He succeeded to the baronetcy on the death of his father.
- Francis William Green (born 1861).

Parliament of the United Kingdom
| Preceded by Somerset Beaumont | Member of Parliament for Wakefield; 1874–1874 | Succeeded by Thomas Kemp Sanderson |
| Preceded by Robert Bownas Mackie | Member of Parliament for Wakefield; 1885–1892 | Succeeded by Albany Charlesworth |
Baronetage of the United Kingdom
| New creation | Baronet (of Wakefield, Yorkshire); 1886–1923 | Succeeded by Edward Lycett Green |
