= Arthur Marshall (British politician) =

English Liberal Party politician

Sir Arthur Marshall KBE

Deputy Liberal Chief Whip in the House of Commons
- In office 12 February 1923 – 6 December 1923
- Leader: H. H. Asquith
- Chief Whip: Vivian Phillipps
- Preceded by: James Hogge
- Succeeded by: Murdoch McKenzie Wood

Member of Parliament for Huddersfield
- In office 15 November 1922 – 6 December 1923
- Preceded by: Charles Sykes
- Succeeded by: James Hudson

Member of Parliament for Wakefield
- In office 19 December 1910 – 14 December 1918
- Preceded by: Edward Brotherton
- Succeeded by: Edward Brotherton

Personal details
- Born: Arthur Harold Marshall; 2 August 1870 Ashton-under-Lyne, Lancashire, UK
- Died: 18 January 1956 (aged 85)
- Party: Liberal
- Spouse: Louie Hepworth
- Parents: H.T. Marshall (father); Mary Keats (mother)
- Education: Yorkshire College
- Profession: Barrister

Sir Arthur Harold Marshall (2 August 1870 – 18 January 1956) was an English Liberal Party politician. He was Member of Parliament (MP) for Wakefield 1910–1918 and for Huddersfield 1922–1923.

== Early life and career ==
Marshall was born in Ashton-under-Lyne, Lancashire, a son of Methodist Minister Rev. H.T. Marshall DD and Mary Keats of Hanley. He was educated privately and at Yorkshire College (University of Leeds). He travelled extensively in South Africa, Canada, U.S.A. and Europe. In 1904 Marshall qualified as a barrister, being called to the Bar by Gray's Inn. He practiced on the North-Eastern Circuit. He was a director of the Legal Insurance Company and of J Hepworth & Son (Limited). He was director of Bradford & District Newspaper Company Limited.

== Political career ==
Marshall was elected to Harrogate Town Council, serving for six years. In December 1910 he was elected to parliament as Liberal MP for Wakefield. He gained his seat from the Conservatives. He was the first Liberal to win the division since 1880. From 1910–1918 he served as a Liberal Whip. He was Chairman and Honorary Secretary of the Yorkshire Liberal Federation. He was Chairman of the Central Billeting Board. He was a member of the National War Savings Committee and of the National War Aims Committee.

In December 1918 he lost his seat to the Unionist candidate who had the endorsement of the wartime Coalition Government. In 1920 when a Conservative vacancy occurred in Ashton-under-Lyne, the town of his birth, he became the Liberal candidate for the by-election where he came third. At the next general election in 1922 he stood in Huddersfield where he had the support of Huddersfield Liberal Association, and the defending member stood as a National Liberal with the support of David Lloyd George and the local Conservatives. Marshall gained the seat. In parliament he again served as a Liberal Whip. A year later in 1923 there was another general election. This time the Liberals were united, but he narrowly lost the seat to Labour, failing to regain the seat in the 1924 general election. He did not stand for parliament again.

=== Elections contested ===
UK Parliament elections

Date of election	Constituency	Party	Votes	%	Result
1910 (Dec)	Wakefield	Liberal	2,837	51.7	Elected
1918	Wakefield	Liberal	2,448	14.0	Not elected (3rd)
1920	Ashton-under-Lyne	Liberal	3,511	17.1	Not elected (3rd)
1922	Huddersfield	Liberal	15,879	34.0	Elected
1923	Huddersfield	Liberal	17,404	36.6	Not elected (2nd)
1924	Huddersfield	Liberal	16,626	31.7	Not elected (3rd)

== Personal life and death ==
In 1896 he married Louie Hepworth, the third daughter of Joseph Hepworth JP of Leeds, Torquay and Harrogate. In 1918 he became a Knight Commander of the British Empire. In 1948 his wife died.

Parliament of the United Kingdom
Preceded by Edward Brotherton	Member of Parliament for Wakefield; 1910–1918	Succeeded by Edward Brotherton
Preceded by Charles Sykes	Member of Parliament for Huddersfield; 1922–1923	Succeeded by James Hudson
Party political offices
Preceded by James Hogge	Deputy Liberal Chief Whip in the House of Commons; 1923	Succeeded by Murdoch McKenzie Wood
