= Edward Brotherton =

Edward Brotherton (1814–1866) was an English Swedenborgian and a campaigner for educational reform.

== Life ==
Brotherton was born at Manchester in 1814, and in early life was engaged in the silk trade, but, foreseeing that the commercial treaty with France was likely to bring to an end the prosperity of his business, he retired with a competence.

After a year of continental travel he devoted himself to the work of popular education. The letters of "E.B." in the Manchester newspapers excited great attention, and led to the formation of the Education Aid Society, which gave aid to all parents too poor to pay for the education of their children. The experiment upon the voluntary system tended to prove the necessity of compulsion. This demonstration, which H.A. Bruce, afterwards Lord Aberdare, called "the thunderclap from Manchester", paved the way for the Education Act of 1870. Brotherton's zeal in the cause was unbounded; he had patience, a winning grace of manner, and a candour only too rare in controversy. In the course of his visitations among the poor he caught a fever, of which he died, after a few days' illness, at Cornbrook, Manchester, 23 March 1866, and was buried at the Wesleyan cemetery in Cheetham Hill. There is a portrait of him in Manchester Town Hall.

== Writings ==
Besides many contributions to periodicals he wrote:

- Mormonism; its Rise and Progress, and the Prophet Joseph Smith (Manchester, 1846). Brotherton had taken part in 1840 in exposing a Mormon elder, James Malone, who claimed to possess the miraculous 'gift of tongues.
- Spiritualism, Swedenborg, and the New Church (London, 1860). This pamphlet has reference to the claims of the Rev. Thomas Lake Harris to a seership similar to that of Swedenborg, claims which were vehemently denied by many members of the 'New Church signified by the New Jerusalem in the Revelation,' as the Swedenborgian congregations are officially styled. Brotherton prints a letter from Dr. J.J. Garth Wilkinson as to identity of the phenomena of respiration in Swedenborg and Harris. From this tract it will be seen that Brotherton was a disciple of Swedenborg, with a tendency to belief in spiritualistic phenomena.
- The Present State of Popular Education in Manchester and Salford, the substance of seven letters reprinted from the "Manchester Guardian," by E. B.; (Manchester, 1864).

He was the editor and chief writer of the first volume of a monthly periodical, The Dawn (Manchester, 1861-2). He wrote frequently as "Libra" and as "Pilgrim" in Swedenborgian periodicals. His chief contributions were the "Outlines of my Mental History", which appeared in the Intellectual Repository for 1849.
