= Orr-Ewing baronets of Ballikinrain and Lennoxbank (1886) =

Orr-Ewing baronets
- Escutcheon of the Orr-Ewing baronets of Ballikinrain and Lennoxbank (1886)
- Creation date: 1886
- Status: extant
- Motto: Audaciter (Boldly)
- Arms: Argent, a chevron gules, issuant therefrom a banner of the second thereon in the first quarter the arms of St Andrew viz, azure a saltire argent; between in chief two mullets gules and in base the sun in its splendour, the whole within a bordure indented gules charged with three martlets argent, two in chief and one in base
- Crest: A demi-lion rampant gules holding in its dexter paw a mullet as in the arms

The Orr-Ewing baronetcy, of Ballikinrain in the parish of Killearn in the County of Stirling and of Lennoxbank in the parish of Bonhill in the County of Dunbarton, was created in the Baronetage of the United Kingdom on 8 March 1886 for the politician Archibald Orr-Ewing, Member of Parliament for Dumbarton from 1868 to 1892. He was the fifth son of William Ewing, a merchant of Glasgow, and Susan, daughter of John Orr, Provost of Paisley.

== Orr-Ewing baronets, of Ballikinrain and Lennoxbank (1886) ==
- Sir Archibald Orr-Ewing, 1st Baronet (1818–1893)
- Sir William Orr Ewing, 2nd Baronet (1848–1903)
- Sir Archibald Ernest Orr Ewing, 3rd Baronet (1853–1919)
- Sir Norman Archibald Orr-Ewing, 4th Baronet (23 November 1880 – 26 March 1960). Orr-Ewing was a Brigadier-General in the Army and served as Grand Master of the Grand Lodge of Scotland from 1937 to 1939. He married Laura Louisa Robarts, a granddaughter of Percy Barrington, 8th Viscount Barrington, on 24 July 1911.
- Sir Ronald Archibald Orr-Ewing, 5th Baronet (14 May 1912 – 14 September 2002), succeeded his father in 1960. He married Marion Hester Cameron, daughter of Sir Donald Walter Cameron of Lochiel, on 6 April 1938. They had four children.
- Sir Archibald Donald Orr-Ewing, 6th Baronet (born 20 December 1938). The eldest son of the 5th Baronet, he was educated at Gordonstoun and Trinity College Dublin. He was the Grand Master Mason of The Grand Lodge of Ancient, Free and Accepted Masons of Scotland, until 27 November 2008, a post he held since 2005; he had previously held the post between 1999 and 2004. He married firstly Venetia Turner on 10 December 1965. They divorced in 1972 and Orr-Ewing then married as his second wife Nicola Black, a great-granddaughter of James Innes-Ker, 7th Duke of Roxburghe.

The heir apparent is the current holder's son Alistair Frederick Archibald Orr Ewing (born 1982).

== Extended family ==
Charles Lindsay Orr-Ewing, fifth son of the 1st Baronet, was Member of Parliament for Ayr Burghs from 1895 to 1903. His son Sir Ian Leslie Orr-Ewing (1893–1958) was Member of Parliament for Weston-super-Mare from 1934.

== Notes ==
Baronetage of the United Kingdom
Preceded by Paget baronets	Orr-Ewing baronets of Ballikinrain and Lennoxbank; 8 March 1886	Succeeded by Birkbeck baronets
