= 1874 Wakefield by-election =

UK Parliamentary by-election

The 1874 Wakefield by-election was fought on 4 May 1874. The by-election was fought due to the void election of the incumbent Conservative MP, Edward Green. It was won by the Conservative candidate Thomas Kemp Sanderson.
