= Wakefield (constituency) =

Parliamentary constituency in the United Kingdom, 1832–2024

- Former county constituency for the House of Commons
- 2010–2024 boundary of Wakefield in West Yorkshire

- Location of West Yorkshire within England
- County: West Yorkshire
- Electorate: 70,509 (December 2019)
- Major settlements: Wakefield, Ossett

1885–2024
- Seats: One
- Replaced by: Ossett and Denby Dale, Wakefield and Rothwell

1832–1885
- Seats: One
- Type of constituency: Borough constituency
- Created from: Yorkshire

Wakefield was a constituency in West Yorkshire, England. It was created as a borough constituency in 1832 and reformed as a county constituency in 1885.

Further to the completion of the 2023 Periodic Review of Westminster constituencies, the seat was abolished. Its area was split between the new seats of Wakefield and Rothwell and Ossett and Denby Dale, first contested at the 4 July 2024 general election.

== Boundaries ==
Map of 2010-2024 boundaries 2010-2024

1885-1918: The existing parliamentary borough, and so much of the parish of Sandal Magna as lies to the north-east of the Great Northern and Manchester, Sheffield and Lincolnshire Railway, being the portion known as Belle Vue.

1918–1950: The County Borough of Wakefield.

1950–1955: The County Borough of Wakefield, the Urban District of Horbury, and part of the Rural District of Wakefield.

1955–1983: The County Borough of Wakefield, the Urban Districts of Horbury and Royston, and part of the Rural District of Wakefield.

1983–1997: The City of Wakefield wards of Horbury, Wakefield Central, Wakefield East, Wakefield North, Wakefield Rural, and Wakefield South.

1997–2010: The City of Wakefield wards of Wakefield Central, Wakefield East, Wakefield North, and Wakefield Rural, and the Metropolitan Borough of Kirklees wards of Denby Dale and Kirkburton.

2010–2024: The City of Wakefield wards of Horbury and South Ossett, Ossett, Wakefield East, Wakefield North, Wakefield Rural, and Wakefield West.

=== 2010 boundary changes ===
Parliament accepted the Boundary Commission's Fifth Periodic Review of Westminster constituencies which altered this constituency for the 2010 general election, removing all three rural wards from the neighbouring borough of Kirklees that reached far to the south-west (Note: The wards of: Denby Dale and large parts of Almondbury, and Kirkburton) and instead adding wards from the abolished Normanton constituency to the immediate west. Since 2010 the seat comprised three-quarters of the City of Wakefield along with Ossett, Horbury and small outlying settlements.

The far eastern suburbs of the city and its southern part fell within the Wakefield South ward, which was in the Hemsworth seat. Its largest towns were, by a small margin, the towns of South Elmsall and South Kirkby, which form a contiguous settlement 7 miles (11 km) to the east.

=== 2024 boundary changes ===
Parliament accepted the Boundary Commission's 2023 Periodic Review of Westminster constituencies which dissolved this constituency for the 2024 general election. The constituency was split between newly created Ossett and Denby Dale and Wakefield and Rothwell constituencies, with latter receiving wards of Wakefield.

== History ==
=== Predecessor seats ===
Electors of the area, since five years before the Model Parliament of 1295 until 1826 had entitlement to vote for the two representatives for Yorkshire, the largest county in the country. Parliament legislated for, from an unusual disfranchisement in 1826 of a Cornish rotten borough, two additional MPs. (Note: This Cornish seat was a 19th-century byword for corruption, Grampound.) From April 1784 until September 1812, one of the two members elected was William Wilberforce, internationally recognised as a leading figure in abolitionism (the anti-slavery movement). The large county was given far greater representation by the Reform Act 1832: Belle Vue's electors until 1885, alongside other Forty Shilling Freeholders non-resident in the Parliamentary Borough of Wakefield itself but owning such property in any part of the county division could elect the two members for that division: this became the West Riding of Yorkshire from 1832 until 1865 (which had its polling place in this city), after which, the relevant county subdivision became the Southern West Riding until 1885.

=== Creation ===
Wakefield became a county division under the Redistribution of Seats Act 1885, drawing in, as an extension, the Belle Vue area of the parish of Sandal Magna.

=== Results ===
Wakefield returned Labour MPs from 1932 to 2017. The size of majority had fluctuated between absolute and marginal. (Note: The Labour majority in 1966 was the greatest at 30.8% of the vote; that in 1983 was the narrowest since 1932, at 360 votes, see incumbent MP Walter Harrison (Lab) who did not stand for re-election in 1987.) The 2015 result gave the seat the 27th-smallest majority of Labour's 232 seats by percentage of majority. In 2019, Wakefield lost the Labour majority and returned the first Conservative MP in 87 years.

The seat was represented from 2019 to 2022 by Imran Ahmad Khan, who was elected as a member of the Conservative Party, was suspended by the party, and was then an independent. Ahmad Khan was found guilty in 2022 of sexually assaulting a 15-year-old boy in 2008 serving an 18 month jail term resulting in his resignation as an MP. His resignation became effective on 3 May 2022, when he was appointed Steward of the Chiltern Hundreds.

This triggered a by-election. A by-election was held on 23 June to replace him. Looked on as a key "Red Wall" seat, Labour regained the constituency with a substantial 12.7% swing.

=== Opposition parties ===
From 1923 until 2019 the runner-up candidate was a Conservative. Six non-Labour candidates stood in 2015 of whom two, those which were Conservative and from UKIP won more than 5% of the vote, keeping their deposits.

=== Prominent frontbenchers ===
Rt Hon Arthur Greenwood was succeeded by Clement Attlee as leader of the Opposition in 1945, a few months before the party's landslide election victory. He had been from 1929 to 1931 the Minister of Health in the Second MacDonald ministry. In this role he successfully steered the Housing Act 1930 through both Houses of Parliament under the minority government, which expended more significant subsidies for slum clearance, allowing more affordable, spacious housing to be built for residents of slums. When the wartime coalition government was formed, Winston Churchill appointed him to the British War Cabinet as Minister without Portfolio in 1940. He was generally seen in such a role as of little wartime legislative effect, but in May 1940 he emerged as Churchill's strongest and most vocal supporter in the lengthy War Cabinet debates on whether to accept or reject a peace offer from Germany. Without the vote in favour of fighting on by Greenwood and Clement Attlee, Churchill would not have had the slim majority he needed to do so.

Rt Hon Arthur Creech Jones was Secretary of State for the Colonies from October 1946 until February 1950, appropriately given that in June 1936 he pressed the Government, who were encouraging Colonies to set up memorials to King George V, to follow the example of Uganda and set up a technical educational institution. The Labour Party nominated him to the Colonial Office's Educational Advisory Committee in 1936, on which he served for nine years. In 1937, he was a founding member of the Trades Union Congress Colonial Affairs Committee, and in 1940 he founded the Fabian Colonial Bureau.

Mary Creagh held various shadow cabinet posts between 2010 and 2015. She resigned her post following the election of Jeremy Corbyn as Labour party leader.

=== Abolition ===
Further to the completion of the 2023 Periodic Review of Westminster constituencies, the seat was abolished prior to the 2024 general election, with its contents split in two:

- The urban areas of Wakefield itself (Wakefield East, Wakefield North and Wakefield West wards) to be included in the newly created constituency of Wakefield and Rothwell
- The majority of the electorate, comprising the outlying towns and rural areas (Horbury and South Ossett, Ossett and Wakefield Rural wards) will be part of the new constituency of Ossett and Denby Dale

== Constituency profile ==
The constituency contained a rolling landscape with villages surrounding the city of Wakefield which is well connected to West Yorkshire, in particular Leeds, Bradford and Huddersfield, however also via two junctions of the M1 to the west, to South Yorkshire such as Barnsley, Rotherham and Sheffield. The small city itself has a large central trading and industrial estate, a central park, Clarence Park which includes a national athletics training squad, a Rugby League major team, Wakefield Trinity and its own Cathedral. Wakefield Europort employs approximately 3,000 people, a major rail-motorway hub for Northern England imports and exports with EU countries. Horbury and Ossett and towns in the low foothills of the Pennines. In the far west of the constituency, there was the National Coal Mining Museum for England, on the site of the old Caphouse Colliery.

Workless claimants, registered jobseekers, were in November 2012 slightly higher than the regional average of 4.9%, at 5.3% of the population based on a statistical compilation by The Guardian, which is also higher than the national average of 3.8%.

Of the council wards, the Wakefield East and Wakefield North areas regularly return Labour councillors, whereas the others are marginal. The Ossett ward is particularly unpredictable, and has elected Conservative, Labour, Liberal Democrat and UKIP councillors since 2005. The other wards are contested between Labour and Conservative. Between 1997 and 2010 the constituency included the wards of Denby Dale and Kirkburton, generally Conservative-voting suburbs of Huddersfield in the neighbouring Kirklees borough. These joined Dewsbury, in the same borough, in 2010.

=== Turnout ===
Turnout in general elections since 1918 has ranged between 54.5% in 2001 and 87.3% in 1950.

== Members of Parliament ==
| Election | Member | Party |
|---|---|---|
| 1832 | Daniel Gaskell | Radical |
| 1837 | William Lascelles | Conservative |
| 1841 | Joseph Holdsworth | Whig |
| 1842 by-election | William Lascelles | Conservative |
| 1847 | George Sandars | Conservative |
| 1857 | John Charlesworth | Conservative |
| 1859 | William Henry Leatham | Liberal |
| 1862 by-election | John Dalrymple-Hay | Conservative |
| 1865 | William Henry Leatham | Liberal |
| 1868 | Somerset Beaumont | Liberal |
| 1874 | Edward Green | Conservative |
| 1874 by-election | Thomas Kemp Sanderson | Conservative |
| 1880 | Robert Bownas Mackie | Liberal |
| 1885 by-election | Edward Green | Conservative |
| 1892 | Albany Charlesworth | Conservative |
| 1895 | William Wentworth-Fitzwilliam | Conservative |
| 1902 by-election | Edward Brotherton | Conservative |
| 1910 (December) | Arthur Marshall | Liberal |
| 1918 | Edward Brotherton | Conservative |
| 1922 | Robert Ellis | Conservative |
| 1923 | George Sherwood | Labour |
| 1924 | Geoffrey Ellis | Conservative |
| 1929 | George Sherwood | Labour |
| 1931 | George Hillman | Conservative |
| 1932 by-election | Arthur Greenwood | Labour |
| 1954 by-election | Arthur Creech Jones | Labour |
| 1964 | Walter Harrison | Labour |
| 1987 | David Hinchliffe | Labour |
| 2005 | Mary Creagh | Labour |
| 2019 | Imran Ahmad Khan | Conservative |
| June 2021 | Imran Ahmad Khan | Independent |
| 2022 by-election | Simon Lightwood | Labour |
| 2024 | Constituency abolished | |

== Elections ==
Results over time

=== Elections in the 2020s ===
2022 Wakefield by-election
| Party | Candidate | Votes | % | ±% |
|---|---|---|---|---|
| Labour | Simon Lightwood | 13,166 | 47.9 | +8.1 |
| Conservative | Nadeem Ahmed | 8,241 | 30.0 | −17.3 |
| Independent | Akef Akbar | 2,090 | 7.6 | N/A |
| Yorkshire | David Herdson | 1,182 | 4.3 | +2.4 |
| Green | Ashley Routh | 587 | 2.1 | New |
| Reform | Chris Walsh | 513 | 1.9 | New |
| Liberal Democrats | Jamie Needle | 508 | 1.8 | −2.1 |
| Britain First | Ashlea Simon | 311 | 1.1 | New |
| Freedom Alliance | Mick Dodgson | 187 | 0.7 | New |
| Monster Raving Loony | Sir Archibald Stanton Earl 'Eaton | 171 | 0.6 | New |
| CPA | Paul Bickerdike | 144 | 0.5 | New |
| English Democrat | Thérèse Hirst | 135 | 0.5 | New |
| UKIP | Jordan Gaskell | 124 | 0.5 | New |
| NIP | Christopher Jones | 84 | 0.3 | New |
| Independent | Jayda Fransen | 23 | 0.1 | N/A |
| Majority | | 4,925 | 17.9 | N/A |
| Turnout | | 27,466 | 39.5 | −24.6 |
| Labour gain from Conservative | | Swing | +12.7 | |

=== Elections in the 2010s ===
General election 2019: Wakefield
| Party | Candidate | Votes | % | ±% |
|---|---|---|---|---|
| Conservative | Imran Ahmad Khan | 21,283 | 47.3 | +2.3 |
| Labour | Mary Creagh | 17,925 | 39.8 | −9.9 |
| Brexit Party | Peter Wiltshire | 2,725 | 6.1 | New |
| Liberal Democrats | Jamie Needle | 1,772 | 3.9 | +1.9 |
| Yorkshire | Ryan Kett | 868 | 1.9 | −0.6 |
| Independent | Stephen Whyte | 454 | 1.0 | N/A |
| Majority | | 3,358 | 7.5 | N/A |
| Turnout | | 45,027 | 64.1 | −1.7 |
| Conservative gain from Labour | | Swing | +6.1 | |

General election 2017: Wakefield
| Party | Candidate | Votes | % | ±% |
|---|---|---|---|---|
| Labour | Mary Creagh | 22,987 | 49.7 | +9.4 |
| Conservative | Antony Calvert | 20,811 | 45.0 | +10.8 |
| Yorkshire | Lucy Brown | 1,176 | 2.5 | New |
| Liberal Democrats | Finbarr Cronin | 943 | 2.0 | −1.5 |
| Independent | Wajid Ali | 367 | 0.8 | New |
| Majority | | 2,176 | 4.7 | −1.4 |
| Turnout | | 46,284 | 65.8 | +4.9 |
| Labour hold | | Swing | −0.7 | |

General election 2015: Wakefield
| Party | Candidate | Votes | % | ±% |
|---|---|---|---|---|
| Labour | Mary Creagh | 17,301 | 40.3 | +1.0 |
| Conservative | Antony Calvert | 14,688 | 34.2 | −1.4 |
| UKIP | Alan Hazelhurst | 7,862 | 18.3 | New |
| Liberal Democrats | Finbarr Cronin | 1,483 | 3.5 | −12.8 |
| Green | Rebecca Thackray | 1,069 | 2.5 | +0.5 |
| TUSC | Mick Griffiths | 287 | 0.7 | New |
| CISTA | Elliot Barr | 283 | 0.7 | New |
| Majority | | 2,613 | 6.1 | +2.4 |
| Turnout | | 42,973 | 60.9 | −1.8 |
| Labour hold | | Swing | +1.3 | |

General election 2010: Wakefield
| Party | Candidate | Votes | % | ±% |
|---|---|---|---|---|
| Labour | Mary Creagh | 17,454 | 39.3 | −4.8 |
| Conservative | Alex Story | 15,841 | 35.6 | +9.1 |
| Liberal Democrats | David Smith | 7,256 | 16.3 | −2.5 |
| BNP | Ian Senior | 2,581 | 5.8 | +2.7 |
| Green | Miriam Hawkins | 873 | 2.0 | −1.0 |
| Independent | Mark Harrop | 439 | 1.0 | New |
| Majority | | 1,613 | 3.7 | −8.6 |
| Turnout | | 44,444 | 62.7 | +1.3 |
| Labour hold | | Swing | −6.9 | |

=== Elections in the 2000s ===
General election 2005: Wakefield
| Party | Candidate | Votes | % | ±% |
|---|---|---|---|---|
| Labour | Mary Creagh | 18,802 | 43.3 | −6.6 |
| Conservative | Alec Shelbrooke | 13,648 | 31.5 | +0.9 |
| Liberal Democrats | David Ridgway | 7,063 | 16.3 | +3.9 |
| BNP | Grant Rowe | 1,328 | 3.1 | New |
| Green | Derek Hardcastle | 1,297 | 3.0 | +0.4 |
| UKIP | John Upex | 467 | 1.1 | −0.5 |
| English Democrat | Adrian McEnhill | 356 | 0.8 | New |
| Socialist | Mick Griffiths | 319 | 0.7 | New |
| Socialist Labour | Linda Sheridan | 101 | 0.2 | −1.3 |
| Majority | | 5,154 | 11.8 | −7.5 |
| Turnout | | 43,381 | 59.3 | +4.8 |
| Labour hold | | Swing | −3.7 | |

General election 2001: Wakefield
| Party | Candidate | Votes | % | ±% |
|---|---|---|---|---|
| Labour | David Hinchliffe | 20,592 | 49.9 | −7.5 |
| Conservative | Thelma Karran | 12,638 | 30.6 | +2.1 |
| Liberal Democrats | Dale Douglas | 5,097 | 12.4 | +1.2 |
| Green | Sarah Greenwood | 1,075 | 2.6 | New |
| UKIP | Janice Cannon | 677 | 1.6 | New |
| Socialist Labour | Abdul Aziz | 634 | 1.5 | New |
| Socialist Alliance | Mick Griffiths | 541 | 1.3 | New |
| Majority | | 7,954 | 19.3 | −9.6 |
| Turnout | | 41,254 | 54.5 | −14.6 |
| Labour hold | | Swing | | |

=== Elections in the 1990s ===
General election 1997: Wakefield
| Party | Candidate | Votes | % | ±% |
|---|---|---|---|---|
| Labour | David Hinchliffe | 28,977 | 57.4 | +6.8 |
| Conservative | Jonathan Peacock | 14,373 | 28.5 | −9.8 |
| Liberal Democrats | Douglas Dale | 5,656 | 11.2 | +0.1 |
| Referendum | Simon Shires | 1,480 | 2.9 | New |
| Majority | | 14,604 | 28.9 | +16.6 |
| Turnout | | 50,486 | 68.9 | −7.3 |
| Labour hold | | Swing | | |

General election 1992: Wakefield
| Party | Candidate | Votes | % | ±% |
|---|---|---|---|---|
| Labour | David Hinchliffe | 26,964 | 50.6 | +4.0 |
| Conservative | David P. Fanthorpe | 20,374 | 38.3 | −3.0 |
| Liberal Democrats | Tim J. Wright | 5,900 | 11.1 | −1.0 |
| Majority | | 6,590 | 12.3 | +7.0 |
| Turnout | | 53,238 | 76.2 | +0.6 |
| Labour hold | | Swing | +3.5 | |

=== Elections in the 1980s ===
General election 1987: Wakefield
| Party | Candidate | Votes | % | ±% |
|---|---|---|---|---|
| Labour | David Hinchliffe | 24,509 | 46.6 | +4.2 |
| Conservative | Norman Hazell | 21,720 | 41.3 | +1.3 |
| SDP | Lutfe Kamal | 6,350 | 12.1 | −7.2 |
| Majority | | 2,789 | 5.3 | +4.9 |
| Turnout | | 52,579 | 75.6 | +6.3 |
| Labour hold | | Swing | | |

General election 1983: Wakefield
| Party | Candidate | Votes | % | ±% |
|---|---|---|---|---|
| Labour | Walter Harrison | 19,166 | 40.4 | |
| Conservative | Norman Hazell | 18,806 | 40.0 | |
| SDP | David Carlton | 9,166 | 19.3 | |
| BNP | V Parker | 295 | 0.6 | New |
| Majority | | 360 | 0.4 | |
| Turnout | | 47,433 | 69.33 | |
| Labour hold | | Swing | | |

=== Elections in the 1970s ===
General election 1979: Wakefield
| Party | Candidate | Votes | % | ±% |
|---|---|---|---|---|
| Labour | Walter Harrison | 27,124 | 50.90 | |
| Conservative | J Sheard | 19,571 | 36.73 | |
| Liberal | N Collins-Tooth | 6,059 | 11.37 | |
| National Front | A Cooper | 530 | 0.99 | New |
| Majority | | 7,553 | 14.17 | |
| Turnout | | 53,284 | 75.57 | |
| Labour hold | | Swing | | |

General election October 1974: Wakefield
| Party | Candidate | Votes | % | ±% |
|---|---|---|---|---|
| Labour | Walter Harrison | 25,616 | 54.82 | |
| Conservative | EJL Koops | 12,810 | 27.41 | |
| Liberal | A Fussey | 8,304 | 17.77 | |
| Majority | | 12,806 | 27.41 | |
| Turnout | | 46,730 | 70.23 | |
| Labour hold | | Swing | | |

General election February 1974: Wakefield
| Party | Candidate | Votes | % | ±% |
|---|---|---|---|---|
| Labour | Walter Harrison | 27,032 | 51.34 | |
| Conservative | EJL Koops | 15,614 | 29.65 | |
| Liberal | A Fussey | 10,009 | 19.01 | |
| Majority | | 11,418 | 21.69 | |
| Turnout | | 52,655 | 79.87 | |
| Labour hold | | Swing | | |

General election 1970: Wakefield
| Party | Candidate | Votes | % | ±% |
|---|---|---|---|---|
| Labour | Walter Harrison | 27,352 | 58.08 | |
| Conservative | Dale Smith | 15,668 | 33.27 | |
| Liberal | Nancy Seear | 4,071 | 8.64 | New |
| Majority | | 11,684 | 24.81 | |
| Turnout | | 47,081 | 72.65 | |
| Labour hold | | Swing | | |

=== Elections in the 1960s ===
General election 1966: Wakefield
| Party | Candidate | Votes | % | ±% |
|---|---|---|---|---|
| Labour | Walter Harrison | 28,907 | 65.39 | |
| Conservative | Ron Benson | 15,299 | 34.61 | |
| Majority | | 13,608 | 30.78 | |
| Turnout | | 44,206 | 73.38 | |
| Labour hold | | Swing | | |

General election 1964: Wakefield
| Party | Candidate | Votes | % | ±% |
|---|---|---|---|---|
| Labour | Walter Harrison | 26,315 | 55.45 | |
| Conservative | John Spence | 14,385 | 30.31 | |
| Liberal | John M. Collins | 6,753 | 14.23 | New |
| Majority | | 11,930 | 25.14 | |
| Turnout | | 47,453 | 77.97 | |
| Labour hold | | Swing | | |

=== Elections in the 1950s ===
General election 1959: Wakefield
| Party | Candidate | Votes | % | ±% |
|---|---|---|---|---|
| Labour | Arthur Creech Jones | 29,705 | 59.63 | |
| Conservative | Michael Jopling | 20,114 | 40.37 | |
| Majority | | 9,591 | 19.26 | |
| Turnout | | 49,819 | 81.95 | |
| Labour hold | | Swing | | |

General election 1955: Wakefield
| Party | Candidate | Votes | % | ±% |
|---|---|---|---|---|
| Labour | Arthur Creech Jones | 28,180 | 60.45 | |
| Conservative | Denton Hinchcliffe | 18,435 | 39.55 | |
| Majority | | 9,745 | 20.90 | |
| Turnout | | 46,615 | 77.92 | |
| Labour hold | | Swing | | |

By-election 21 October 1954: Wakefield
| Party | Candidate | Votes | % | ±% |
|---|---|---|---|---|
| Labour | Arthur Creech Jones | 21,822 | 58.14 | −0.14 |
| Conservative | Maurice Macmillan | 15,714 | 41.86 | +0.14 |
| Majority | | 6,108 | 16.28 | −0.28 |
| Turnout | | 37,536 | | |
| Labour hold | | Swing | | |

General election 1951: Wakefield
| Party | Candidate | Votes | % | ±% |
|---|---|---|---|---|
| Labour | Arthur Greenwood | 27,100 | 58.28 | |
| Conservative | Maurice Grant | 19,398 | 41.72 | |
| Majority | | 7,702 | 16.56 | |
| Turnout | | 46,498 | 85.27 | |
| Labour hold | | Swing | | |

General election 1950: Wakefield
| Party | Candidate | Votes | % | ±% |
|---|---|---|---|---|
| Labour | Arthur Greenwood | 25,996 | 55.38 | |
| Conservative | Harry Watson | 15,925 | 33.92 | |
| Liberal | Stanley Berwin | 5,022 | 10.70 | |
| Majority | | 10,071 | 21.46 | |
| Turnout | | 46,943 | 87.31 | |
| Labour hold | | Swing | | |

=== Election in the 1940s ===
General election 1945: Wakefield
| Party | Candidate | Votes | % | ±% |
|---|---|---|---|---|
| Labour | Arthur Greenwood | 14,378 | 54.75 | |
| Conservative | Harry Watson | 8,268 | 31.49 | |
| Liberal | George Leonard Jack Oliver | 3,613 | 13.76 | New |
| Majority | | 6,110 | 23.26 | |
| Turnout | | 26,259 | 80.37 | |
| Labour hold | | Swing | | |

=== Elections in the 1930s ===
General election 1935: Wakefield
| Party | Candidate | Votes | % | ±% |
|---|---|---|---|---|
| Labour | Arthur Greenwood | 15,804 | 56.03 | |
| Conservative | AE Greaves | 12,400 | 43.97 | |
| Majority | | 3,404 | 12.06 | |
| Turnout | | 28,204 | 84.91 | |
| Labour hold | | Swing | | |

1932 Wakefield by-election
| Party | Candidate | Votes | % | ±% |
|---|---|---|---|---|
| Labour | Arthur Greenwood | 13,586 | 50.6 | +8.0 |
| Conservative | A. E. Greaves | 13,242 | 49.4 | −8.0 |
| Majority | | 344 | 1.2 | N/A |
| Turnout | | 26,828 | 83.0 | −2.5 |
| Labour gain from Conservative | | Swing | | |

General election 1931: Wakefield
| Party | Candidate | Votes | % | ±% |
|---|---|---|---|---|
| Conservative | George Hillman | 15,881 | 57.43 | |
| Labour | George Sherwood | 11,774 | 42.57 | |
| Majority | | 4,107 | 14.86 | N/A |
| Turnout | | 27,655 | 85.53 | |
| Conservative gain from Labour | | Swing | | |

=== Elections in the 1920s ===
General election 1929: Wakefield
| Party | Candidate | Votes | % | ±% |
|---|---|---|---|---|
| Labour | George Sherwood | 13,393 | 48.8 | +0.9 |
| Unionist | Geoffrey Ellis | 10,180 | 37.1 | −15.0 |
| Liberal | Leonard Parish | 3,875 | 14.1 | New |
| Majority | | 3,213 | 11.7 | N/A |
| Turnout | | 27,448 | 85.6 | +0.8 |
| Labour gain from Unionist | | Swing | +7.9 | |

General election 1924: Wakefield
| Party | Candidate | Votes | % | ±% |
|---|---|---|---|---|
| Unionist | Geoffrey Ellis | 11,086 | 52.1 | +15.3 |
| Labour | George Sherwood | 10,192 | 47.9 | +8.0 |
| Majority | | 894 | 4.2 | N/A |
| Turnout | | 21,278 | 84.8 | +3.9 |
| Unionist gain from Labour | | Swing | +3.6 | |

General election 1923: Wakefield
| Party | Candidate | Votes | % | ±% |
|---|---|---|---|---|
| Labour | George Sherwood | 7,966 | 39.9 | −8.6 |
| Unionist | Geoffrey Ellis | 7,345 | 36.8 | −14.7 |
| Liberal | Eric John Lassen | 4,640 | 23.3 | New |
| Majority | | 621 | 3.1 | N/A |
| Turnout | | 19,951 | 80.9 | −3.5 |
| Labour gain from Unionist | | Swing | +3.0 | |

General election 1922: Wakefield
| Party | Candidate | Votes | % | ±% |
|---|---|---|---|---|
| Unionist | Geoffrey Ellis | 10,416 | 51.5 | −0.8 |
| Labour | Albert Bellamy | 9,798 | 48.5 | +14.8 |
| Majority | | 618 | 3.0 | −15.6 |
| Turnout | | 20,214 | 84.4 | +12.3 |
| Unionist hold | | Swing | −7.8 | |

=== Elections in the 1910s ===
General election 1918: Wakefield
| Party | | Candidate | Votes | % | ±% |
|---|---|---|---|---|---|
| C | Unionist | Edward Brotherton | 9,128 | 52.3 | |
| | Labour | Albert Bellamy | 5,882 | 33.7 | New |
| | Liberal | Arthur Marshall | 2,448 | 14.0 | |
| Majority | | | 3,246 | 18.6 | N/A |
| Turnout | | | 17,458 | 72.1 | |
| | Unionist gain from Liberal | | Swing | | |
C indicates candidate endorsed by the coalition government.

General Election 1914–15:

Another General Election was required to take place before the end of 1915. The political parties had been making preparations for an election to take place and by July 1914, the following candidates had been selected;

- Liberal: Arthur Marshall
- Unionist: Edward Brotherton

Arthur Marshall

General election December 1910: Wakefield
| Party | Candidate | Votes | % | ±% |
|---|---|---|---|---|
| Liberal | Arthur Marshall | 2,837 | 51.7 | New |
| Conservative | Edward Brotherton | 2,651 | 48.3 | −6.2 |
| Majority | | 186 | 3.4 | N/A |
| Turnout | | 5,488 | | |
| Liberal gain from Conservative | | Swing | | |

General election January 1910: Wakefield
| Party | Candidate | Votes | % | ±% |
|---|---|---|---|---|
| Conservative | Edward Brotherton | 3,121 | 54.5 | +13.7 |
| Labour | Stanton Coit | 2,602 | 45.5 | +8.6 |
| Majority | | 519 | 9.0 | +5.1 |
| Turnout | | 5,723 | 90.5 | +2.0 |
| Conservative hold | | Swing | +2.5 | |

=== Elections in the 1900s ===
Coit

General election 1906: Wakefield
| Party | Candidate | Votes | % | ±% |
|---|---|---|---|---|
| Conservative | Edward Brotherton | 2,285 | 40.8 | N/A |
| Labour Repr. Cmte. | Stanton Coit | 2,068 | 36.9 | N/A |
| Liberal | Thomas Snape | 1,247 | 22.3 | New |
| Majority | | 217 | 3.9 | N/A |
| Turnout | | 5,600 | 88.5 | N/A |
| Registered electors | | 6,326 | | |
| Conservative hold | | Swing | N/A | |

1902 Wakefield by-election
| Party | Candidate | Votes | % | ±% |
|---|---|---|---|---|
| Conservative | Edward Brotherton | 2,960 | 59.9 | N/A |
| Labour Repr. Cmte. | Philip Snowden | 1,979 | 40.1 | New |
| Majority | | 981 | 19.8 | N/A |
| Turnout | | 4,939 | 80.9 | N/A |
| Registered electors | | 6,103 | | |
| Conservative hold | | Swing | N/A | |

General election 1900: Wakefield
| Party | Candidate | Votes | % | ±% |
|---|---|---|---|---|
| Liberal Unionist | William Wentworth-Fitzwilliam | Unopposed | | |
| Liberal Unionist hold | | | | |

=== Elections in the 1890s ===
General election 1895: Wakefield
| Party | Candidate | Votes | % | ±% |
|---|---|---|---|---|
| Liberal Unionist | William Wentworth-Fitzwilliam | 2,864 | 56.9 | +2.7 |
| Liberal | Henry Smithson Lee Wilson | 2,165 | 43.1 | −2.7 |
| Majority | | 699 | 13.8 | +5.4 |
| Turnout | | 5,029 | 87.5 | −2.8 |
| Registered electors | | 5,748 | | |
| Liberal Unionist hold | | Swing | +2.7 | |

General election 1892: Wakefield
| Party | Candidate | Votes | % | ±% |
|---|---|---|---|---|
| Conservative | Albany Charlesworth | 2,582 | 54.2 | +0.5 |
| Liberal | Thomas Young Strachan | 2,178 | 45.8 | −0.5 |
| Majority | | 404 | 8.4 | +1.0 |
| Turnout | | 4,199 | 90.3 | +2.8 |
| Registered electors | | 5,274 | | |
| Conservative hold | | Swing | +0.5 | |

=== Elections in the 1880s ===
General election 1886: Wakefield
| Party | Candidate | Votes | % | ±% |
|---|---|---|---|---|
| Conservative | Edward Green | 2,253 | 53.7 | 0.0 |
| Liberal | John James Cousins | 1,946 | 46.3 | 0.0 |
| Majority | | 307 | 7.4 | 0.0 |
| Turnout | | 4,199 | 87.5 | −4.6 |
| Registered electors | | 4,801 | | |
| Conservative hold | | Swing | 0.0 | |

General election 1885: Wakefield
| Party | Candidate | Votes | % | ±% |
|---|---|---|---|---|
| Conservative | Edward Green | 2,374 | 53.7 | +8.7 |
| Liberal | Wentworth Beaumont | 2,049 | 46.3 | −8.7 |
| Majority | | 325 | 7.4 | N/A |
| Turnout | | 4,423 | 92.1 | +2.0 |
| Registered electors | | 4,801 | | |
| Conservative gain from Liberal | | Swing | +8.7 | |

By-election, 4 July 1885: Wakefield
| Party | Candidate | Votes | % | ±% |
|---|---|---|---|---|
| Conservative | Edward Green | 1,918 | 53.6 | +8.6 |
| Liberal | William Hartley Lee | 1,661 | 46.4 | −8.6 |
| Majority | | 257 | 7.2 | N/A |
| Turnout | | 3,579 | 88.9 | −1.2 |
| Registered electors | | 4,026 | | |
| Conservative gain from Liberal | | Swing | +8.6 | |

- Caused by Mackie's death.

General election 1880: Wakefield
| Party | Candidate | Votes | % | ±% |
|---|---|---|---|---|
| Liberal | Robert Bownas Mackie | 2,194 | 55.0 | +7.6 |
| Conservative | Thomas Kemp Sanderson | 1,796 | 45.0 | −7.6 |
| Majority | | 398 | 10.0 | N/A |
| Turnout | | 3,990 | 90.1 | +3.2 |
| Registered electors | | 4,430 | | |
| Liberal gain from Conservative | | Swing | +7.6 | |

=== Elections in the 1870s ===
By-election, 6 May 1874: Wakefield
| Party | Candidate | Votes | % | ±% |
|---|---|---|---|---|
| Conservative | Thomas Kemp Sanderson | 1,814 | 52.7 | +0.1 |
| Liberal | Robert Bownas Mackie | 1,627 | 47.3 | −0.1 |
| Majority | | 187 | 5.4 | +0.2 |
| Turnout | | 3,441 | 88.5 | +1.6 |
| Registered electors | | 3,889 | | |
| Conservative hold | | Swing | +0.1 | |

- Caused by the previous election being declared void on petition, on account of corruption.

General election 1874: Wakefield
| Party | Candidate | Votes | % | ±% |
|---|---|---|---|---|
| Conservative | Edward Green | 1,779 | 52.6 | +3.3 |
| Liberal | Robert Bownas Mackie | 1,600 | 47.4 | −3.3 |
| Majority | | 179 | 5.2 | N/A |
| Turnout | | 3,379 | 86.9 | +2.3 |
| Registered electors | | 3,889 | | |
| Conservative gain from Liberal | | Swing | +3.3 | |

=== Elections in the 1860s ===
General election 1868: Wakefield
| Party | Candidate | Votes | % | ±% |
|---|---|---|---|---|
| Liberal | Somerset Beaumont | 1,557 | 50.7 | −1.9 |
| Conservative | Thomas Kemp Sanderson | 1,512 | 49.3 | +1.9 |
| Majority | | 45 | 1.4 | −3.8 |
| Turnout | | 3,069 | 84.6 | −4.2 |
| Registered electors | | 3,627 | | |
| Liberal hold | | Swing | −1.9 | |

General election 1865: Wakefield
| Party | Candidate | Votes | % | ±% |
|---|---|---|---|---|
| Liberal | William Henry Leatham | 507 | 52.6 | +2.4 |
| Conservative | John Dalrymple-Hay | 457 | 47.4 | −2.4 |
| Majority | | 50 | 5.2 | +4.8 |
| Turnout | | 964 | 88.8 | −2.9 |
| Registered electors | | 1,086 | | |
| Liberal hold | | Swing | +2.4 | |

By-election, 28 February 1862: Wakefield
| Party | Candidate | Votes | % | ±% |
|---|---|---|---|---|
| Conservative | John Dalrymple-Hay | 455 | 51.6 | +1.8 |
| Liberal | Richard Smethurst | 426 | 48.4 | −1.8 |
| Majority | | 29 | 3.2 | N/A |
| Turnout | | 881 | 85.5 | −6.2 |
| Registered electors | | 1,086 | | |
| Conservative gain from Liberal | | Swing | +1.8 | |

- The writ, which had been suspended on 27 July 1859 with Leatham unseated due to being guilty of bribery via his agents, was restored and a by-election was called.

=== Elections in the 1850s ===
General election 1859: Wakefield
| Party | Candidate | Votes | % | ±% |
|---|---|---|---|---|
| Liberal | William Henry Leatham | 406 | 50.2 | New |
| Conservative | John Charlesworth | 403 | 49.8 | N/A |
| Majority | | 3 | 0.4 | N/A |
| Turnout | | 809 | 91.7 | N/A |
| Registered electors | | 882 | | |
| Liberal gain from Conservative | | Swing | N/A | |

General election 1857: Wakefield
| Party | Candidate | Votes | % | ±% |
|---|---|---|---|---|
| Conservative | John Charlesworth | Unopposed | | |
| Registered electors | | 906 | | |
| Conservative hold | | | | |

General election 1852: Wakefield
| Party | Candidate | Votes | % | ±% |
|---|---|---|---|---|
| Conservative | George Sandars | 359 | 52.4 | −7.9 |
| Whig | William Henry Leatham | 326 | 47.6 | +7.9 |
| Majority | | 33 | 4.8 | −15.8 |
| Turnout | | 685 | 89.4 | −5.9 |
| Registered electors | | 766 | | |
| Conservative hold | | Swing | −7.9 | |

=== Elections in the 1840s ===
General election 1847: Wakefield
| Party | Candidate | Votes | % | ±% |
|---|---|---|---|---|
| Conservative | George Sandars | 392 | 60.3 | +12.5 |
| Radical | George William Alexander | 258 | 39.7 | −12.5 |
| Majority | | 134 | 20.6 | N/A |
| Turnout | | 650 | 95.3 | +11.6 |
| Registered electors | | 682 | | |
| Conservative gain from Whig | | Swing | +12.5 | |

On petition, Holdsworth was disqualified due to also being the returning officer at the election, and Lascelles was declared elected on 21 April 1842.

General election 1841: Wakefield
| Party | Candidate | Votes | % | ±% |
|---|---|---|---|---|
| Whig | Joseph Holdsworth | 328 | 52.2 | N/A |
| Conservative | William Lascelles | 300 | 47.8 | −4.4 |
| Majority | | 28 | 4.4 | N/A |
| Turnout | | 628 | 83.7 | −0.1 |
| Registered electors | | 750 | | |
| Whig gain from Conservative | | Swing | | |

=== Elections in the 1830s ===
General election 1837: Wakefield
| Party | Candidate | Votes | % | ±% |
|---|---|---|---|---|
| Conservative | William Lascelles | 307 | 52.2 | +7.9 |
| Radical | Daniel Gaskell | 281 | 47.8 | −7.9 |
| Majority | | 26 | 4.4 | N/A |
| Turnout | | 588 | 83.8 | +3.2 |
| Registered electors | | 702 | | |
| Conservative gain from Radical | | Swing | +7.9 | |

General election 1835: Wakefield
| Party | Candidate | Votes | % |
|---|---|---|---|
| Radical | Daniel Gaskell | 277 | 55.7 |
| Conservative | William Lascelles | 220 | 44.3 |
| Majority | | 57 | 11.4 |
| Turnout | | 497 | 80.6 |
| Registered electors | | 617 | |
| Radical hold | | | |

General election 1832: Wakefield
| Party | Candidate | Votes | % |
|---|---|---|---|
| Radical | Daniel Gaskell | Unopposed | |
| Registered electors | | 726 | |
| Radical win (new seat) | | | |

== See also ==
- List of parliamentary constituencies in West Yorkshire
