= The Marys of the Empire =

Fundraiser

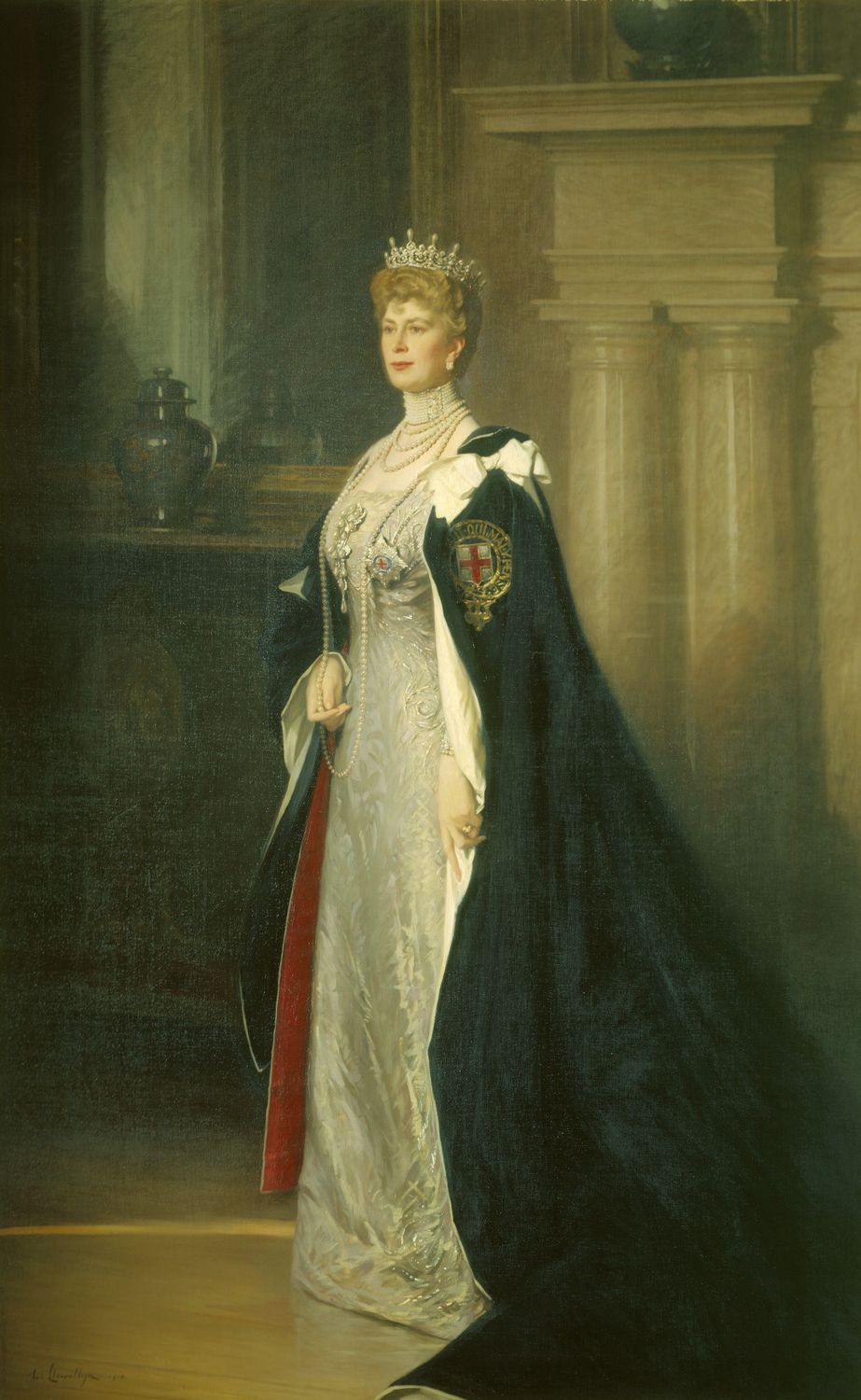
- Queen Mary wearing the insignia of the Order of the Garter
- Location: Britain and Commonwealth
- Founder: Lady Mary Trefusis; Hon. Mrs Geoffrey Hope-Morley
- Established: 1911

Following the announcement of the coronation of Queen-Empress Mary and King-Emperor George V in 1911 "all the Marys in the Empire" donated money towards a gift for the new Queen. 11 years later, to mark the engagement of their daughter Princess Mary to Viscount Lascelles, the Marys of the Empire clubbed together again.

== The name Mary ==
At the start of the 20th century, Mary was the most popular female name in England and Wales. In 1911, there were nearly two million people with the name in Britain, representing just over 4% of the total population. There was an estimated further one million in the British colonies. For both the 1911 and 1922 collections, the name Mary was deemed to include its variants Marie, Maria, Marian, Miriam, May and Molly. The names of all contributors were included with each gift.

== 1911 Marys of the Empire ==
The scheme began as a result of "some women having tea together and discussing the coming coronation, when suddenly one of them drew attention to the fact that the Christian name of every woman in the room was the same as the Queen's and suggested that it would be a good idea for all the Marys present to contribute, and send a coronation gift to the queen."

Overseen by Lady Mary Trefusis, with the Marchioness of Bute, the Duchess of Devonshire, the Marchioness of Graham and Lady Waldegrave, the initial plan was to include "equally distinguished" Marys in the fundraising. However, appeals came from "less distinguished" Marys that they also be included, so it was agreed that any woman sharing the Queen's name, "be they rich or poor, young or old, lowly or exalted" could donate anything from one penny to one pound towards the gift. "Well-known Marys" all over the UK were appointed to collect contributions from their own districts.

One well-known Mary, Lady Bute, sent a circular asking for "all women called Mary in Bute to write to her". Though none knew her motive, many replied, with Lady Bute receiving 1,200 responses from local Marys. In total, Ireland made 31,000 contributions, Scotland 58,000 and England and Wales 119,000. Marys from around the British Empire and the rest of the world, including Australia, British Guiana, Canada, Cape Colony, Chifu, Costa Rica, Demarara, Galilee, Guatemala, Japan, Jerusalem, Johannesburg, Mala, New Brunswick, Rawal, Rhodesia, Pindi donated. One unexpected result of the scheme was that "Mary teas" and "Mary luncheons" became popular for a time.

Upon being told of the planned gift, the Queen was said to "look with favour" on the scheme. The organisers proposed the money would either be spent on either a "personal ornament" or the money would be donated to one of the Queen's favourite charities.

The fund raised almost £20,000 (equivalent to £2,000,000 in 2022). The Queen's initial preference was that the money be donated to charity. However it was the wish of most of the donors that the gift be a personal one, and that the Queen should have an ornament made that she could wear. The Queen asked for a set of the Insignia of the Order of the Garter, consisting of the star, diamond badge, diamond garter and a gold collar with the order's motto "Honi soit qui mal y pense", made by Garrard & Co.

In response to the gift, the Queen wrote, "I thank you most warmly all the Marys of the Empire who have so generously contributed to the gift which has been presented to me. The thought of the affectionate impulse which prompted it has, I can assure you, deeply touched me… I look forward with special satisfaction to devoting the remainder of this noble gift to a charitable object in which I am greatly interested."

=== Charitable donations ===
The Queen donated the remainder of the gift to three of her preferred charities, to fund the following projects:

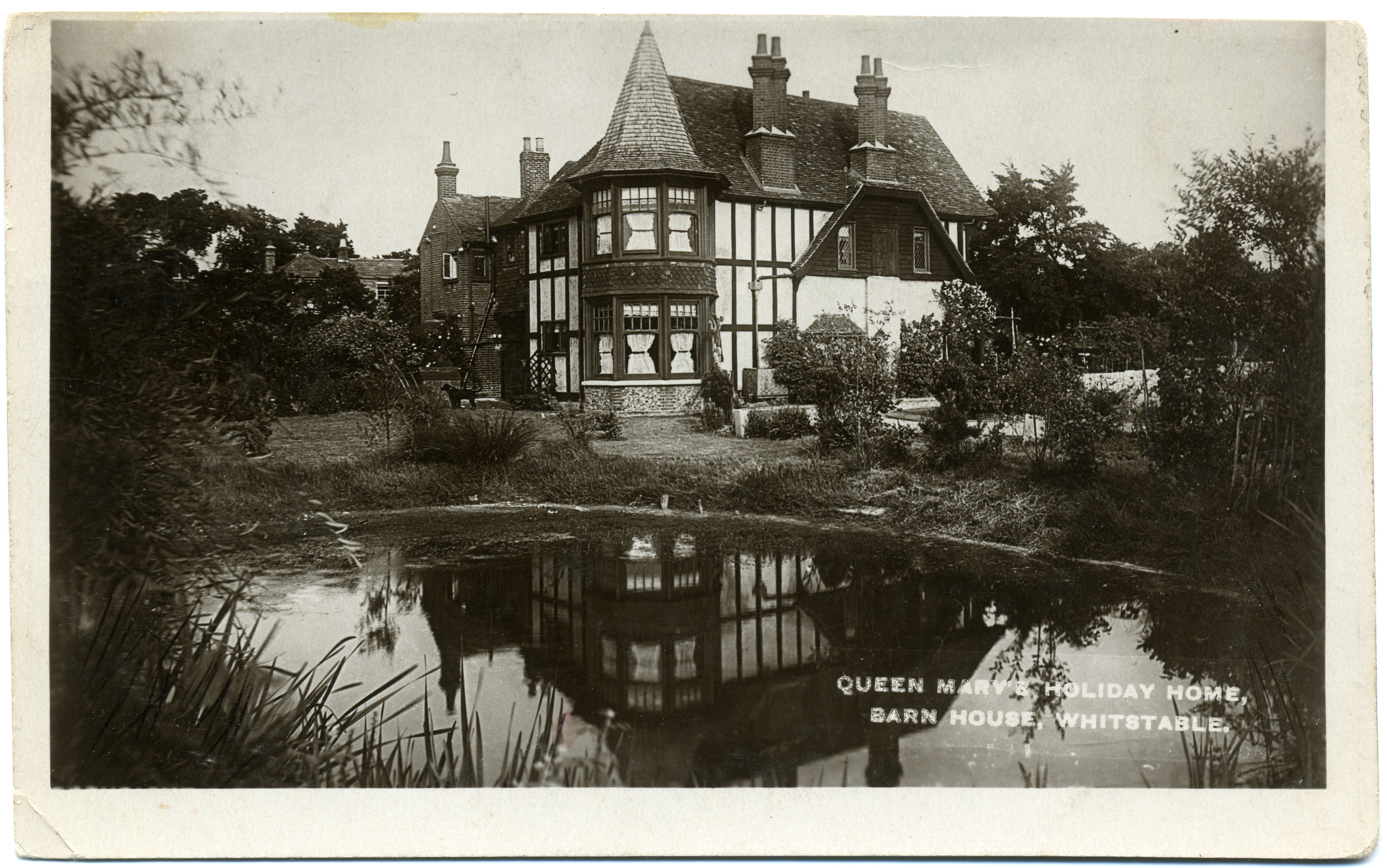
Barn House, Whitstable

- The building of a holiday home for working girls: Queen Mary's Coronation Holiday Home through the London Girls' Club Union, of which she was Patron. The location was Barn House, Whitstable in Kent.
- The building of Queen Mary's Holiday Home for Governesses
- The purchase of the Star and Garter Hotel in Richmond, to create The Star and Garter Home for injured war veterans.

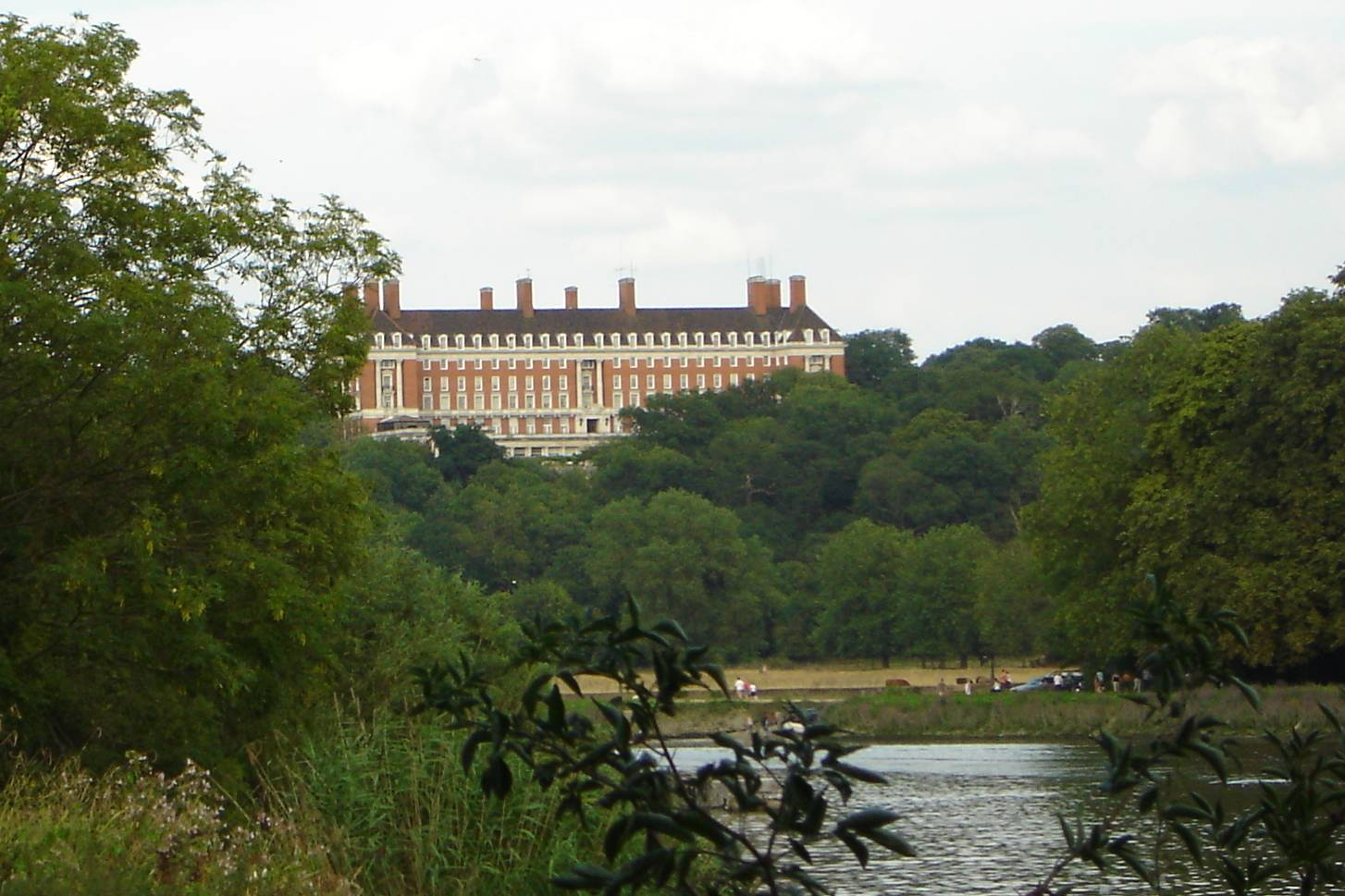
Royal Star and Garter home

=== All the Georges ===
The precedent for such a collection was set on the occasion of the marriage of the Duke of York in 1893, when donations were made by gentlemen who bore the name George. A gift of the Badge of St. George was presented to the future King by Lord George Hamilton.

In 1911, Lord Stradbroke, among others, proposed a similar collection from "all the Georges in the Kingdom" as a gift for King George upon his coronation. The fund raised £3,407 (equivalent to £317,600 in 2023) with part of the money paying for a jeweled badge of the Order of the Garter, containing a cameo of St George and the Dragon. At the King's request, the greater part of the money was put towards talented young Marine officers who were unable to pay for the final stage of their training.

== 1922 Marys of the Empire ==
On the wedding of Queen Mary's daughter, Princess Mary, to Viscount Lascelles, the Marys of the Empire repeated their efforts from 11 years previously. This subsequent collection was the idea of the Honourable Mrs Geoffrey Hope-Morley, a close friend of Princess Mary and Chair of the Marys of the Empire Committee. The committee included such "influential ladies" as Lady Northcliffe, Lady Mary Ashley Cooper, Mrs Massey Lyon, the Marchioness of Hartington, Lady Mary Cambridge and Lady Mary Thynne.

Of this second collection, it was written "It's not exactly a thrillingly new and original idea to ask all the Marys and Harrys to club together and produce something really handsome in the way of a wedding present for their distinguished namesakes. As England must fairly bristle with Harrys and Marys, that present ought to be worth while."

The collection raised around £12,500 (equivalent to £563,258 in 2022). Donors included Girl Guides, numbering over 600,000 in the UK and overseas, who were asked to give a penny each to show "their delight at the betrothal of their Princess President". As it was in 1911, it was the wish of the donors that the money be used on something "tangible and beautiful, to remind her all through her wedded life of the love and devotion of the Marys of Britain and her possessions over the seas". On the destination of the money, the committee chair Mrs Hope-Morley stated, "We know that the Royal Family have always been most unselfish, and have always considered the needs of their loyal subjects, but on such an occasion as this, all the Marys who are organising the scheme feel that they would not like the gift to be the endowment of a hospital or any form of charity for the benefit of others." However, upon learning of the proposed gift, Princess Mary expressed a wish that "money raised in this way should be used for assisting voluntary institutions".

A handwritten letter from Princess Mary to Hope-Morley read: "I wish to thank you… and through you, as far as possible, all the Marys of the Empire, for the splendid present they have combined to give me on the occasion of my marriage… In the future, when I inspect Girl Guides, I shall like to think that some of them have perhaps been trained at the training centre which the generous gift of the Marys has enabled me to found. As the subscribers live in all parts of the Empire, I have decided to spend the greater part of the present in something which I hope will benefit the girlhood of the Empire." signed Mary, Buckingham Palace, 3 March 1922.

=== Foxlease donation ===
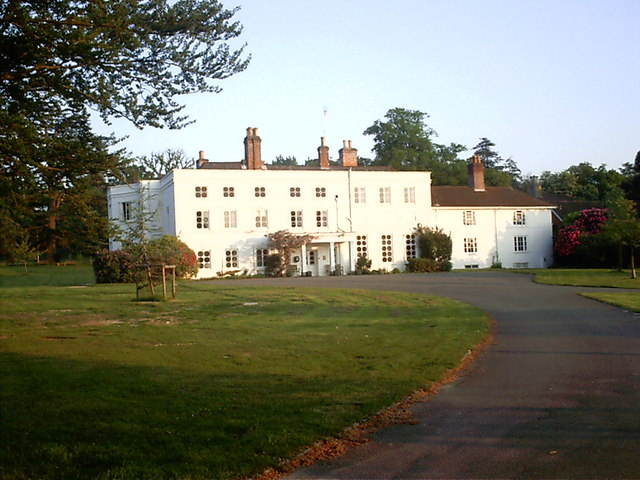
Foxlease House

In early 1922, Mrs Anne Archbold Saunderson, daughter of the former president of the Standard Oil Company of America, gave to Princess Mary as a wedding present her residence at Foxlease Park, Hampshire, together with 80 acres of parkland. Princess Mary in turn gifted the estate to the Girl Guide Association, with the intention of its becoming a leaders’ training centre. Princess Mary's telegram of thanks to Saunderson stated "Your kind act will greatly help to increase the usefulness of the Guide movement."

However, the excitement felt by the Association on receipt of this generous gift was tempered by anxiety about the cost of running such a large estate. On 22 February 1922, a message from Buckingham Palace announced Princess Mary's intention of donating £6,000 out of the gift from the Marys of the Empire towards the running of Foxlease. As the amount the Princess had received from the Marys had been "unexpectedly large", she "refused to allow more than a certain sum to be spent on a personal gift". Later that year she gave an additional £4,000 – half the proceeds from the exhibition of her wedding gifts – which ensured the future of Foxlease, and the house was opened on 2 June 1922.

== The Daily Mirror fund ==
In November 1921 the Daily Mirror newspaper launched an entirely separate appeal to raise money for a "national wedding gift" for Princess Mary. While everybody was encouraged to donate, a special appeal was made to "every woman and child in the country bearing that typically British name Mary" for help. The money was earmarked for "special work in connection with two London hospitals".

== All the Elizabeths (1953) ==
A similar fundraising scheme was launched by the London-based Women's Guild of the Empire in 1953 to mark the commemoration of Queen Elizabeth II. The appeal asked for a donation between a shilling and ten guineas from those throughout the Commonwealth called both Elizabeth and its variants including Elspeth, Eliza, Lizzie and Betty. The money raised was donated to the National Society for the Prevention of Cruelty to Children, of which Queen Elizabeth was Patron.
