= Princess Royal =

Noble title customarily awarded by British monarchs to their eldest daughters

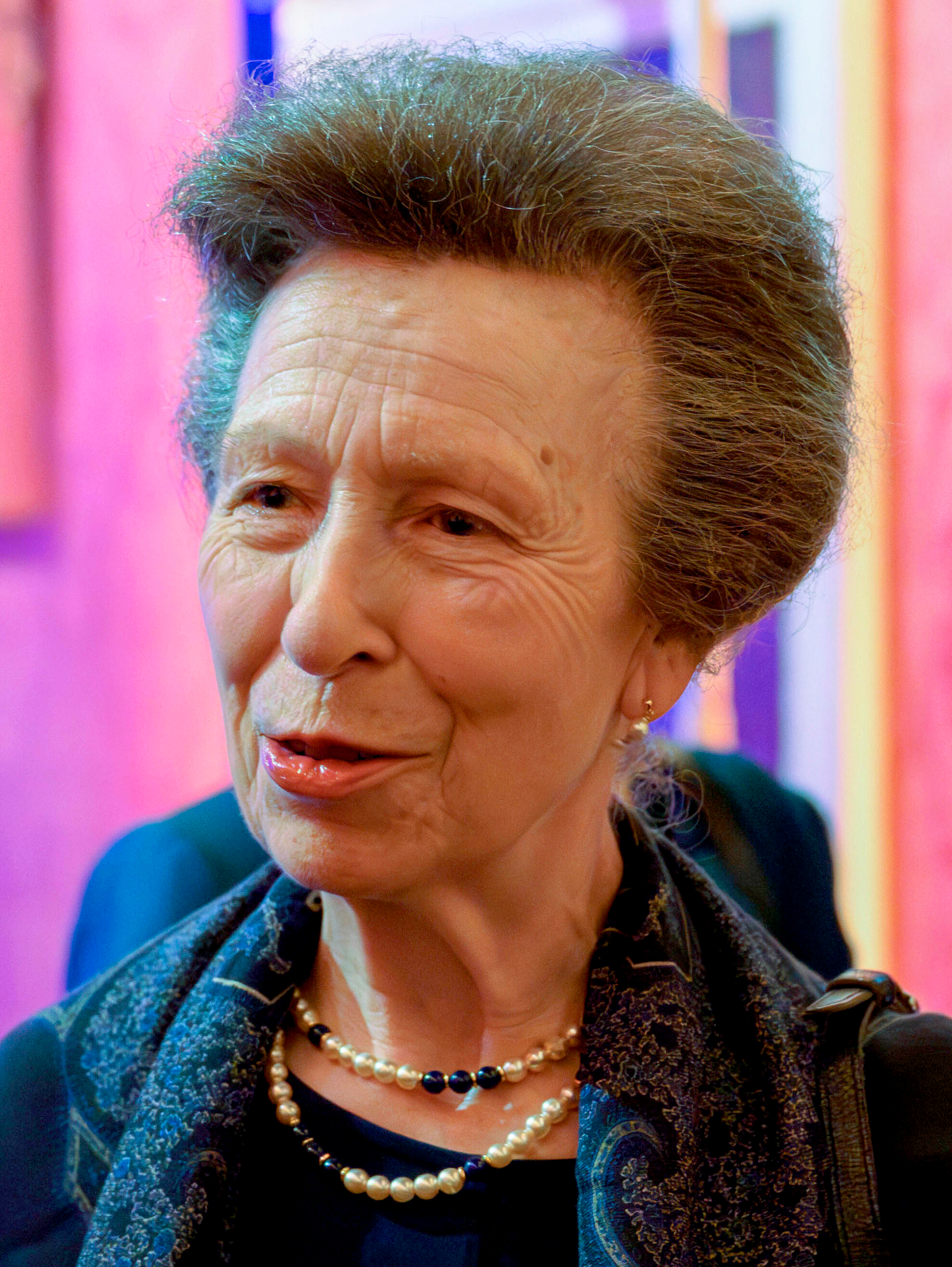
- Incumbent; The Princess Anne since 13 June 1987
- Style: Her Royal Highness
- Residence: St James's Palace
- Appointer: Monarch of the United Kingdom
- Term length: Life tenure or until accession to the throne
- Inaugural holder: Mary, Princess Royal and Princess of Orange

Princess Royal is a title customarily (but not automatically) awarded by British monarchs to their eldest daughters. Although purely honorary, it is the highest honour that may be given to a female member of the royal family. There have been seven Princesses Royal in history; the title is not inherited, and there can be only one holder of it at any one time. Princess Anne became the Princess Royal in 1987.

The title Princess Royal came into existence when Queen Henrietta Maria (1609–1669), daughter of Henry IV, King of France, and wife of King Charles I (1600–1649), wanted to imitate the way the eldest daughter of the King of France was styled "Madame Royale". Thus, Princess Mary (born 1631), the daughter of Henrietta Maria and Charles, became the first Princess Royal in 1642.

It has become established that the title belongs to no one by right, but is given entirely at the sovereign's discretion. Princess Mary (later Queen Mary II) (1662–1694), the elder daughter of King James II, and Princess Sophia Dorothea (1687–1757), the only daughter of King George I, were each 'eligible' for the title but neither received it: at the times they respectively became eligible for the style, Princess Mary was already Princess of Orange, and Sophia Dorothea was already Queen in Prussia. No Princess Royal has ever acceded to the British throne; Princess Victoria, the eldest daughter of Queen Victoria, was the only title holder to simultaneously be heiress presumptive, until she was displaced by the birth of her younger brother Prince Albert Edward (later King Edward VII). With the changes to the rules of succession agreed by the Commonwealth Realms in Perth in 2011, to absolute primogeniture, Princesses Royal in the future are now more likely to accede to the throne.

Princess Louisa Maria (1692–1712), the youngest daughter of King James II (died 1701), born after he lost his crown in the Glorious Revolution of 1688–1689, was considered to be Princess Royal during James's exile by Jacobites at Saint-Germain-en-Laye and was so called by them, even though she was not James's eldest living daughter at any time during her life.

The title is held for life, even if the holder outlives her parent the monarch, and there is only ever one Princess Royal at a time. Upon the death of a Princess Royal, the style is not inherited by any of her daughters; instead, if the monarch parent of the late Princess Royal has also died, the new monarch may bestow it upon their own eldest daughter. Thus, Princess Louise was granted the style of Princess Royal by her father King Edward VII in 1905; she retained it until her death in 1931, more than twenty years into the reign of her brother King George V. Only upon Louise's death did the title become available for George's own daughter, Princess Mary, who was granted the title in 1932, retaining it until her death in 1965. Because Mary outlived not only her father but also her brother King George VI, the title was never available during George VI's reign to be granted to his elder daughter Princess Elizabeth (later Queen Elizabeth II), though she would otherwise have been eligible to hold it.

Customarily, when a princess marries, she takes on her husband's title. If her husband has a lower title or style, her style as a princess remains in use, although it may then be combined with her style by marriage, e.g. HRH The Princess Louise, Duchess of Argyll or HRH Princess Alice, Countess of Athlone – if that princess had a territorial designation, she may cease its use. Exceptionally, however, a princess who has been granted the title of HRH The Princess Royal will not customarily combine it with her style by marriage. For example, Princess Anne has been Her Royal Highness The Princess Royal since being given the title in 1987; prior to that, her formal title was Her Royal Highness The Princess Anne, Mrs Mark Phillips.

== List of title holders ==
The following is a complete list of women formally styled Princess Royal:

Order	Princess Royal and period of tenure	Portrait	Coat of arms	Born	Tenure	Marriages	Died
1	Princess Mary; 1642–1660 (also: Princess of Orange and Countess of Nassau (1647))			4 November 1631, St. James's Palace, London; daughter of King Charles I and Queen Henrietta Maria	18 years	2 May 1641 William II, Prince of Orange (1 son)	24 December 1660, Whitehall Palace, London
2	Princess Anne; 1727–1759 (also: Princess of Orange (1734))			2 November 1709, Herrenhausen Palace, Hanover; daughter of King George II and Queen Caroline	32 years	25 March 1734 William IV of Orange (3 children)	12 January 1759, The Hague, Netherlands
3	Princess Charlotte; 1789–1828 (also: Duchess of Württemberg (1797), Queen consort of Württemberg (1806))			29 September 1766, Buckingham House, London; daughter of King George III and Queen Charlotte	39 years	18 May 1797 Frederick I of Württemberg (1 daughter)	5 October 1828, Ludwigsburg Palace, Baden-Württemberg
4	Princess Victoria; 1841–1901 (also: German Empress and Queen consort of Prussia (1888))			21 November 1840, Buckingham Palace, London; daughter of Queen Victoria and Prince Albert	60 years	25 January 1858 Frederick III, German Emperor (8 children)	5 August 1901, Schloss Friedrichshof, Hesse
5	Princess Louise; 1905–1931 (also: Duchess of Fife (1889))			20 February 1867, Marlborough House, London; daughter of King Edward VII and Queen Alexandra	26 years	27 July 1889 Alexander Duff, 1st Duke of Fife (3 children)	4 January 1931, Portman Square, London
6	Princess Mary; 1932–1965 (also: Countess of Harewood (1929))			25 April 1897, York Cottage, Sandringham; daughter of King George V and Queen Mary	33 years	28 February 1922 Henry Lascelles, 6th Earl of Harewood (2 sons)	28 March 1965, Harewood House, West Yorkshire
7	Princess Anne; 1987–present			15 August 1950, Clarence House, London; daughter of Queen Elizabeth II and Prince Philip	39 years	14 November 1973 Mark Phillips (2 children) — 12 December 1992 Sir Timothy Laurence	— now 76 years, 23 days

== In fiction ==
- In the House of M alternate universe of Marvel Comics, Betsy Braddock is the elder twin sister of the British King and bears the title Princess Royal.
- The novel The Lady Royal, by Molly Costain Haycraft, is a fictionalized account of the life of Isabella de Coucy. According to the narrative, Isabella was titled the Princess Royal and then later given the more 'adult' title of the Lady Royal by her parents. This is a fabrication; although Isabella, as the eldest daughter of Edward III, enjoyed the special privileges that came with her rank, she could not have been titled the Princess Royal because the title was not used in England until long after her death. The title of "the Lady Royal" has never existed.
