= Brunswick Square (disambiguation) =

Brunswick Square may refer to:

== List ==
- Brunswick Square, Bloomsbury, London
- Brunswick Square (shopping mall)
- Brunswick Square (building complex)
- Brunswick Square, Gloucester
- Brunswick Square, Brindleyplace
