= Susan Stevens =

English Girl Guide musician

- Sue Stevens from a 1985 Guider magazine
- Born: 29 January 1936; Bristol, England
- Died: 20 March 1985 (aged 49); Hampshire, England
- Other name: Sue
- Occupation: Girl Guide musician

Susan Stevens (29 January 1936 - 20 March 1985), known as Sue, was a conductor and prolific composer of Guiding songs for Girl Guides UK. She was co-founder of the National Scout and Guide Symphony Orchestra in 1976 and founder of the Foxlease Singing Circle in 1983.

== Personal life, education and work ==
Susan Beryl Stevens was the first child of Herbert William Thornton Jefferies & Francis Beryl Jefferies, née Smith. Her younger sister, Joanna Mary, was born in 1947. Susan married Joseph Ken Stevens in June 1957, in Norton Radstock, Somerset. They had two children. Stevens attended Bath Spa University as a mature music student in the early 1960s, before going on to complete her teacher training. Between c.1971 and 1979 she was Director of Music and Drama at The Blue School, Wells. Stevens died of breast cancer in 1985.

=== Memorial ===
A memorial service was held in Stevens' honour at Wells Cathedral, at which her arrangement of "Lead Me Lord" was sung. A collection was made in Stevens' memory, which was used to purchase an instrument, an oboe called 'Sue' which was added to CHQ's collection of musical instruments. Stevens' bequeathed the royalties from her compositions to Foxlease in the form of the Sue Stevens Training Bequest. As part of this, subsidised Sue Stevens Summer Schools for leaders showing a "strong arts interest" were held at Foxlease into the 1990s.

== Girl Guides ==
Stevens was a Girl Guide and Ranger leader, trainer and music consultant. Between 1971 and 1974 she acted as regional consultant in music and drama for South West Guiding, and from 1974 she was assistant consultant of music at Girl Guiding's national headquarters. In December 1976, together with George Odam, she established the National Scout and Guide Symphony Orchestra at Gilwell Park, London. Stevens became the Girl Guide Association's music advisor in 1981.

=== Large-scale Girl Guiding events ===
Stevens was involved in several large-scale Girl Guiding events, including:

- 1971 - she conducted a group of one hundred Guides at Wells Cathedral for a radio broadcast, as part of an arts magazine programme.
- 1972 - she organised a medieval fair for Somerset Guides, for which she also wrote the music.
- 1977 and 1979 - she acted as assistant music consultant for Girl Guides’ Folk Fest 8 and 9 at the Royal Albert Hall.
- 1985 - to celebrate 75 years of Guiding, Stevens wrote a pageant of Cornish history and legend, together with the accompanying music. It was performed by 350 Brownies, Guides and Rangers at Carlyon Bay, Cornwall, ten days after her death.

== Foxlease, Hampshire ==
From the late 1960s Stevens, together with Hettie Smith and Margaret Newman, organised music and guitar weekends at Foxlease, a Girl Guide training and activity centre in Hampshire. From the late 1970s, Stevens also ran ‘Music in the Pack’ courses there.

In May 1982, Stevens became Foxlease's assistant Guider-In-Charge. Having discovered that Mary, Princess Royal and Countess of Harewood, after whom the main building at Foxlease was named, was a Royal Stewart, she and Guider-in-Charge Marjorie King introduced Royal Stewart tartan neckerchiefs for Foxlease staff.

In October 1983, Stevens established the Foxlease Singing Circle. She invited around 30 Guide leaders from around the UK to Foxlease for a weekend of singing, “to see whether or not it would work!” She was only able to host two weekends with the Singing Circle before she died. The group continues to meet, and some of her protégés, including Pat Belringer, Eryl Evans and Hilary Stokes, continue to write songs.

== Publications ==
Stevens contributed articles and songs to Today’s Guide and The Guider magazines. She also published the following books:

Year	Title	Publisher	Notes
1975	Help yourself to play the guitar	Girl Guides Association	Illustrated by Rosemary Thornton-Jones
1979	Help your patrol to make music]	Girl Guides Association	
1980	Sing For Joy	EMI	Illustrations by Carole Logan. 16 original songs by Stevens.
1981	Swingalong Songs	EMI	Piano accompaniments by Geoffrey Russell-Smith
1993	Just for You - A Very Special Selection of Songs	Foxlease Singing Circle	A collection of Stevens's songs

== Select compositions ==
Several of Stevens's songs were frequently used by schools and young people's groups in the 1980s.

=== Guiding songs ===
- Silver Jubilee Round (1976)
- Ranger Diamond Jubilee song Tomorrow (1977)
- WAGGGS Thinking Day Song (1977)
- Brownie Thank You (1977)
- WAGGGS Jubilee Song (1978)
- We came to Foxlease (1984)
- All Together (1984) WAGGGS’ 75th anniversary song

=== Sacred songs ===
- Jubilate Deo I (1968)
- I am the Way (1970)
- Thou Wilt Keep Him (1970)
- Lo, How A Rose (1971)
- Matthew, Mark, Luke and John (1973)
- Gloria In Excelsis Deo (1973)
- Gloria (1974)
- Psalm 139 (1974)
- At the Ending of the Day (1975)
- Christ our only Saviour (1976)
- Dona Nobis Pacem (1976)
- God Be With You (1976)
- Spring belongs to Little Things (1976)
- I will Lift Up Mine Eyes (1977)
- Merry Bells (1977)
- Vesper (1977)
- Alleluia! (1978)
- Winter Thank You (1980)
- Ding! Dong! Alleluia (1980)
- Blest Creator (1981)
- The Colours of Christmas (1982)
- Lord, we Give Thee Thanks (1982)
- Long Ago (1983)

=== Rounds ===
- For Friends and Homes and Happy Days (1973)
- Goodbye (1973)
- Spring Round (1976)
- Humming Song (1978)
- Dubi du (1982)

=== Other songs ===
- Come Sailing (1968)
- Little Bus (1973)
- Promises (1973)
- Somewhere There’s A Forest (1974)
- All over the World (1975)
- Wandering Wind (1979)
- Look Up to the Sky (1979)
- Song for International Year of the Child (1979)
- Just for You (1980)
- Come Away to the Hills (1981)
- Clap Hands (1981)
- Tails (1981)
- Let’s Celebrate (1982)
- Sing Along Song (1982)
- Follow the Sun (1984)
- The Carnival
- One Day
- Quietly
- Many Years Ago
- The New Generation
- Softly

In 1972 she provided the music for a TV show that aired on Harlech Television about the Tudor period, with author and restorer John Mills.

== Recordings ==
Year	Title	Label	Role / Songs
1972	National Guide Festival of Song	BBC	Features Carnival
1975	Guiding Highlights LP	BBC	Features Somewhere There’s A Forest, Quietly, Many Years Ago
1977	20 Christmas Carols	BBC	Conductor
1978	Sing For Joy LP	BBC	Stevens made all music arrangements
1980	Songs for Tomorrow from Around the World	BBC	Musical director, composer, arranger
1981	Music Builders Chorus V: A Hardie-Mason Project	Berandol	Including Tomorrow
1986	Tribute to Susan Stevens	EMI Music	Including The New Generation and Somewhere There's A Forest. Recorded by members of the Showtime ’85 cast, conducted by Enid Mulholland with the Peter Gosling Band
