= 12–18 Brunswick Square, Gloucester =

Seven 19th-century houses in Gloucester

12–18 Brunswick Square
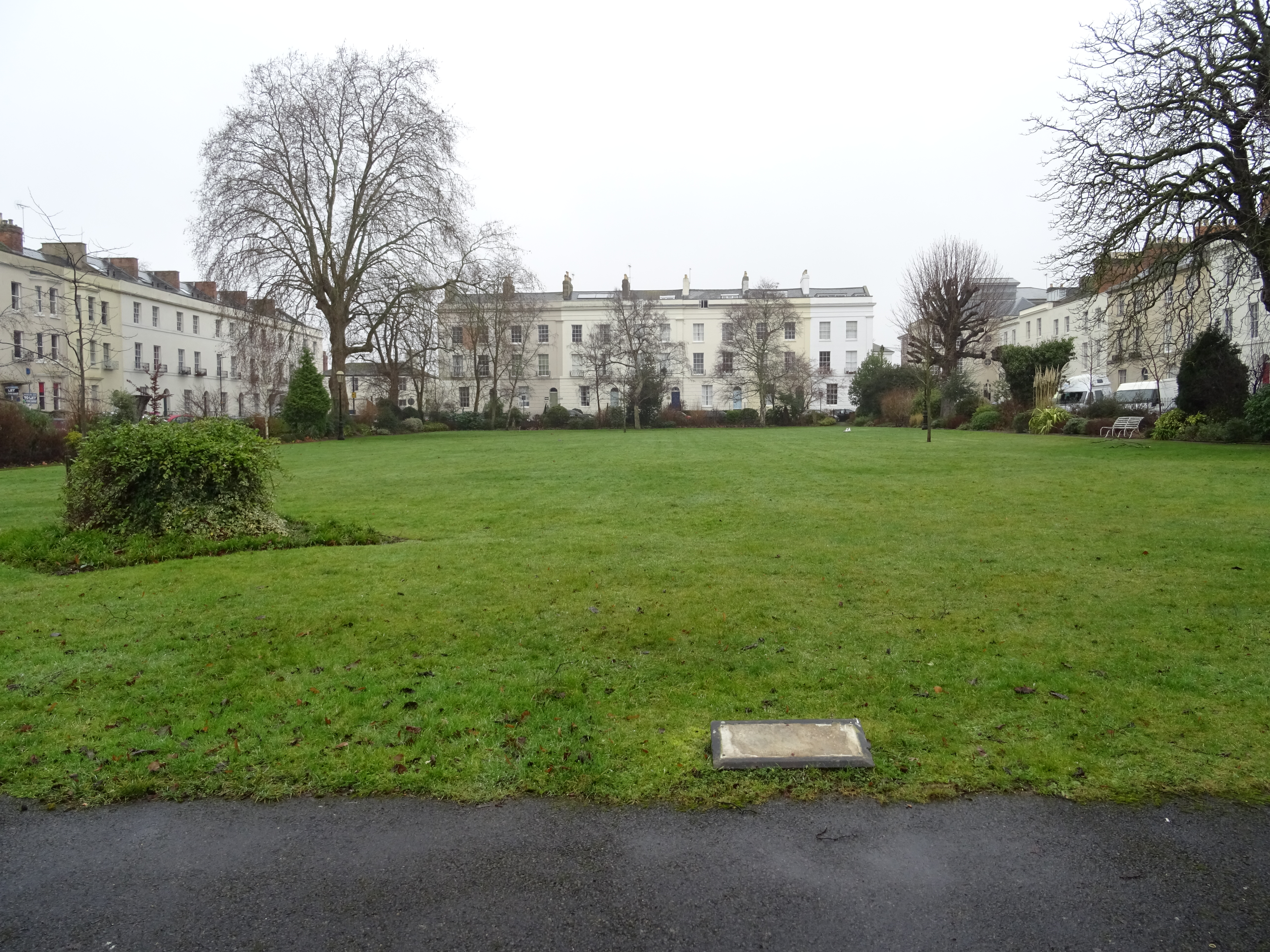
- Interactive map of the 12–18 Brunswick Square area

General information
- Location: Gloucester, United Kingdom
- Coordinates: 51.861420°N 2.248149°W
- Completed: 1825

Height
- Roof: Slate

Technical details
- Material: Brick
- Floor count: 4

12–18 Brunswick Square is a set of seven 19th-century terraced houses on the west side of Brunswick Square in the English city of Gloucester. The buildings were completed in 1825 as part of the development of Brunswick Square led by Thomas Reece. In the 1930s Princess Mary visited the YMCA at 18 Brunswick Square. It has since been converted into offices and flats, and has been a Grade II listed building since 21 January 1952.

== Architecture ==
The three-storey buildings have stuccoed brick at the front and sides, whilst the back is plain brick. The roofs consist of slate tiles and a large chimney stack with multiple chimneys. All the buildings are set back from the street with small gardens at the front. At the back they have extensions in varying sizes, and a couple of the buildings have small back gardens. All of them have semi-basements with small street level windows. The entrance of number 12 is set back from the rest of the buildings and number 15 protrudes forward slightly more than the others. At the front the basement and ground floors are styled with continuous rustication, which can be seen as a painted brick effect. The ground and first floors are separated by a continuous concrete band. From the first floor upwards the walls are stuccoed with embedded pillars separating each building topped with a square capital. The pillars support the coped parapet roof. In front of the entrance to each doorway is a flight of stone steps, with wrought iron railings. The doorways of 13–18 are recessed slightly and have semi-circular arched tops, which are filled with decorated metal fanlights. The doorway of number 12 isn't recessed and has a plain semi-circular fanlight. To the left of each doorway is a sash window on the ground floor, there are two sash windows to each of the upper floors. The first floor windows have decorative cast iron window guards, and all other windows have plain stone sills.

The houses are generally regarded to have the original staircases and other joinery. The ceilings have molded plaster coving, and there are original fireplaces throughout.
