= Foxlease =

Hampshire activity and training centre

Foxlease Park
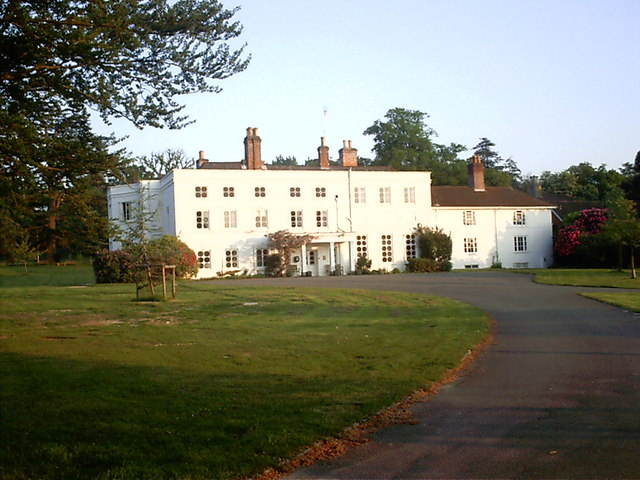
- Princess Mary House, Foxlease Park
- Owner: Foxie's Future CIO
- Location: Lyndhurst, Hampshire
- Country: United Kingdom

Foxlease Park is an outdoor training and activity centre near Lyndhurst, Hampshire, UK. The site is now owned by Foxie's Future CIO, a charity set up to save Foxlease for future generations following Girlguiding's decision to sell it in May 2023. On 19 November 2024, Foxie's Future completed their purchase and is currently^{[when?]} in the process of improvements at the site with a view to reopening it in 2025. The Foxlease estate was owned and managed by the Guides since 1922. The estate is 65 acres (260,000 m^{2}) and the main house is known as The Princess Mary House, in honour of her marriage. Foxlease hosted the Guides' Third International Conference, the Sixth World Conference and also the first World Camp.

== Property ==
=== Princess Mary House ===
The Princess Mary House, a Georgian house renamed in honour of Princess Mary's marriage in 1922, still has Adam fireplaces and a Strawberry Hill Gothic lounge. Individual rooms have been adopted by Guides from around the world and personalised by them. Modernisation has created conference and residential facilities. These including training and meeting rooms, and accommodation for overnight stays.

=== Princess Margaret Lodge ===
Princess Margaret Lodge was built to replace Beaverbrook Lodge. It accommodates self-catering groups and there is disabled access on both floors. It was opened in 2005 by the Countess of Wessex, then President of Girlguiding

=== Coach house ===
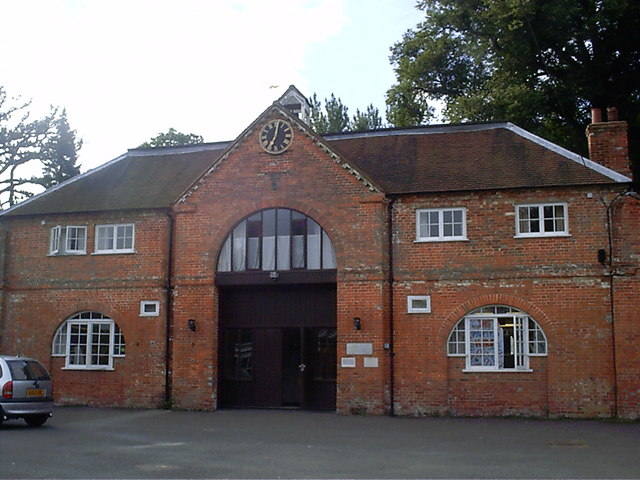
The Coach House

The Coach house is a listed building, constructed in the 18th century. It provides self-catering accommodation.

=== Barn ===
The Barn is self-catering accommodation. Early photos show a thatched roof, but this barn was burnt down in 1958 and has since been replaced with a modern building.

=== Campsites ===
There are several campsites at Foxlease, including Cedars, Katherine Wilson, Birches, Appletree and Bridges. Most of the sites have a shelter with a toilet and shower block. Most of the campsites close at the end of September for the winter, but Katherine Wilson and Appletree are kept open.

=== Activity facilities ===
There is a 9m climbing wall, a low rope course, a high rope course and a covered, heated swimming pool. Kayaking and rafting facilities are also available. There are also nature trails.

== History ==
The first mention of the house is from 1604, when it was owned by Charles Blount, 8th Baron Mountjoy. In 1667, Mabel, wife of John Cole, petitioned King Charles II for a lease of the property as a reward for her attendance on the late King Charles I in his imprisonment. King Charles II planted a tree there. About 1770 the owner was Sir Phillip Jennings-Clarke, MP for Totnes, who re-built Foxlease, but retained part of the old Tudor building. By 1775 the house stood completed, changed from a keeper's lodge into a mansion, not too large for comfort, with wide casement windows and two wings stretching westward with a cobbled yard in between. The new, straight, shallow staircase led to the best bedrooms. In 1791 Sir Phillip sold Foxlease to Isaac Pickering, who in 1827 in turn sold the house to Wentworth Bayley, who in his turn sold the house, after only a year, to Henry Weyland Powell, educated at Trinity College, Cambridge 1807, joined the Grenadier Guards in 1808, served in the Peninsular War, and as a lieutenant at Quatre Bras and Waterloo. He was appointed High Sheriff of Hampshire in 1834, and was described as "of Foxlease, Hants". He was buried at Fulham Cemetery. His father Thomas Powell was in partnership with his brother David. Another brother was James Powell; all three (and another brother, Baden) were children of David Powell and Susannah Thistlethwayte, née Baden. David and James were the grandfathers of the Rev. Prof Baden Powell, who was the father of Robert Baden-Powell, founder of Scouting and, with his sister Agnes, founder of the Girl Guides.

=== Acquisition by Girlguiding UK ===
Some time after the marriage in 1906 of Armar Dayrolles Saunderson from Ireland to the American Anne Mills Archbold, they bought Foxlease. But the marriage turned sour, and in 1921, Foxlease was put up for sale. Hampshire Girl Guides asked for and received permission to camp there and several training weeks were held there during 1921.

In January 1922, upon her divorce, Anne Saunderson née Archbold, now the owner of Foxlease, fled the country with their children, wishing to sever all ties with Britain lest her husband obtain custody of their children, so she wrote to the Executive Committee of the Girl Guides Association, offering to give them the house and 60 acres (240,000 m^{2}) to be a training centre for Guiders. Despite the suitability of the property and the need for such a venue, the committee's considered opinion was that the Guides did not have sufficient resources for the upkeep and it would not be wise to accept the gift.

The offer coincided with the preparations for the marriage of Princess Mary, who was the very active President of the Girl Guides Association. Less than a week before the Royal wedding on 28 February 1922, Rose Kerr was contacted by Lady Mary Trefusis (Lady of the Bedchamber to Queen Mary), the bride's mother, because Olave Baden-Powell, the World Chief Guide, was not in London. Lady Trefusis was on the committee of a fund to which all the Marys of the British Empire had contributed, for a wedding present to the Princess. The Princess insisted that she could only accept a portion of the fund as a personal gift. Trefusis proposed to Kerr that the remainder be spent buying a training centre for the Girl Guides, a cause close to the Princess's heart. Kerr suggested that the fund could furnish and equip Foxlease, but this was not immediately accepted as the fund wanted a place that would be associated with Princess Mary's name. As the matter had to be settled by the next day, Kerr gave Trefusis the phone number of Pax Hill, the Baden-Powells' home.

Olave Baden-Powell and her little daughters were in bed with influenza when she received the phone call, but the day before the wedding she went to London and discussed it with Mrs Geoffrey Hope Morley, head of the committee who ran the "Marys’ gift" to Princess Mary. Mrs Saunderson was consulted and the outcome was that her gift was accepted. The house was renamed The Princess Mary House and Princess Mary gave £6,000 from the fund to furnish and equip the house. Later she gave £4,000, half the proceeds of the exhibition of her wedding gifts, towards the upkeep of the property.

Alice Behrens was appointed the first Guider-in-Charge. Each room was adopted by Guides from a country, county of Britain or school and embellished and furnished by them. Helen Storrow gave the money to equip the small lodge and Juliette Low stayed in it for several weeks to get it in order. Senator and Mrs William A. Clark furnished the Garden Room in memory of their daughter, after whom Camp Andree Clark (now part of the Edith Macy Conference Center) in the US is named.

Foxlease was opened on 2 June 1922. The Second International Conference was in session in Cambridge at that time, so 24 Guiders from the conference visited for a short training course.

=== Third International Conference ===
The Third International Conference was held at the same time as the first World Camp.

=== World Camp ===
The first World Camp took place from 16–24 July 1924. Olave Baden-Powell and Olivia Burges formulated the idea in September 1923, during the latter's stay at Pax Hill. The original invitation was for six Guides and one Guider from each country where there were Guides. However, this was modified to accommodate those who were willing and able to send more. In total 1100 girls and women attended, 600 of which were from overseas. Forty countries were represented.

=== Sixth World Conference ===
The Sixth World Conference was held at Foxlease from 5–12 July 1930. Helen Gwynne-Vaughan chaired this conference at which the constitution of the World Association of Girl Guides and Girl Scouts, drawn up at the previous international conference, was settled. Olave Baden-Powell was also unanimously voted World Chief Guide by the twenty-eight countries recognised by the World Bureau. This conference also approved the idea of a World Flag, an idea originally proposed by South Africa some years earlier.

The first International Trainers' Conference was held simultaneously with the World Conference.

== Gifts from around the globe ==
=== New Zealand ===
In 1926, each member of the New Zealand Guide Association gave one penny. This bought a wooden inlaid writing desk made of New Zealand timber which was given to Foxlease.

== Foxlease Singing Circle ==
In October 1983 Sue Stevens established the Foxlease Singing Circle. She invited around 30 Guide leaders from around the UK to Foxlease for a weekend of singing, “to see whether or not it would work!” She was only able to host two weekends with the Singing Circle before she died. The group continues to meet, and some of her protégés, including Pat Belringer, Eryl Evans and Hilary Stokes, continue to write songs.

== Plans for the future ==
Plans were being drawn up for the creation of a "Museum of Guiding" to hold the extensive Guiding archives currently in store.

On 18 May 2023, Girlguiding announced that Foxlease was to be sold along with four other training and activity centres in the UK.

== See also ==
- Foxlease and Ancells Meadows SSSI
- Broneirion
- Edith Macy Conference Center
- Gilwell Park
- Waddow Hall
- The Marys of the Empire fundraiser
