= Lady Mary Trefusis =

English hymnwriter and courtier

- Lady Mary Trefusis from a 1927 magazine article
- Born: 26 February 1869; London, England
- Died: 12 September 1927 (aged 58); Truro, Cornwall
- Spouse: Lt.-Col. Henry Hepburn-Stuart-Forbes-Trefusis
- Father: 6th Earl Beauchamp

Lady Mary Hepburn-Stuart-Forbes-Trefusis (née Lygon; 26 February 1869 – 12 September 1927) was an English hymnwriter and courtier. She was Lady of the Bedchamber to Queen Mary, having joined her household while Mary was Princess of Wales.

She was a daughter of the 6th Earl Beauchamp and the wife of Lt.-Col. Henry Hepburn-Stuart-Forbes-Trefusis (a son of the 20th Baron Clinton) in 1905 and had issue.

In the 1920s Trefusis was on the Diocesan Advisory Committee for Truro.

== Music ==
Lady Mary was a friend and promoter of the composer Edward Elgar and is thought to be commemorated anonymously in one of his Enigma Variations entitled "Romanza (***)". She was the first president of the English Folk Dance Society (EFDS). and was for a time a collector of English folk dances. Trefusis Hall in the EFDS HQ, Cecil Sharp House, is named after her. She directed a number of choirs, and together with Mary Wakefield was the joint founder of the National Association of Music Competition Festivals in 1904. She served as president of the Society of Women Musicians from 1918-1919. She collected, arranged and published Henry VIII – Songs, Ballads and Instrumental pieces in 1912.

== Foxlease ==
Lady Mary was instrumental in the acquisition of the house of Foxlease by the Girl Guides Association. During the preparations for the marriage of Princess Mary, who was President of the Girl Guides Association Rose Kerr was contacted by Trefusis, because Olave Baden-Powell, the World Chief Guide, was not in London. Trefusis was on the committee of a fund to which all the Marys of the British Empire had contributed, for a wedding present to the Princess. The Princess insisted that she could only accept a proportion of the fund as a personal gift. Trefusis proposed to Kerr that the remainder be spent buying a training centre for the Girl Guides, a cause close to the Princess's heart. Kerr suggested that the fund could furnish and equip Foxlease, but this was not immediately accepted as the Fund wanted a place that would be associated with Princess Mary's name. As the matter had to be settled by the next day, Kerr gave Trefusis the phone number of Pax Hill, the Baden-Powells' home.

== Sources ==
- Seddon, Laura (15 April 2016). British Women Composers and Instrumental Chamber Music in the Early Twentieth Century. Routledge. ISBN 9781317171348 – via Google Books.
