= Brunswick Square, Gloucester =

Garden square in Gloucester, United Kingdom

Brunswick Square
- Garden square
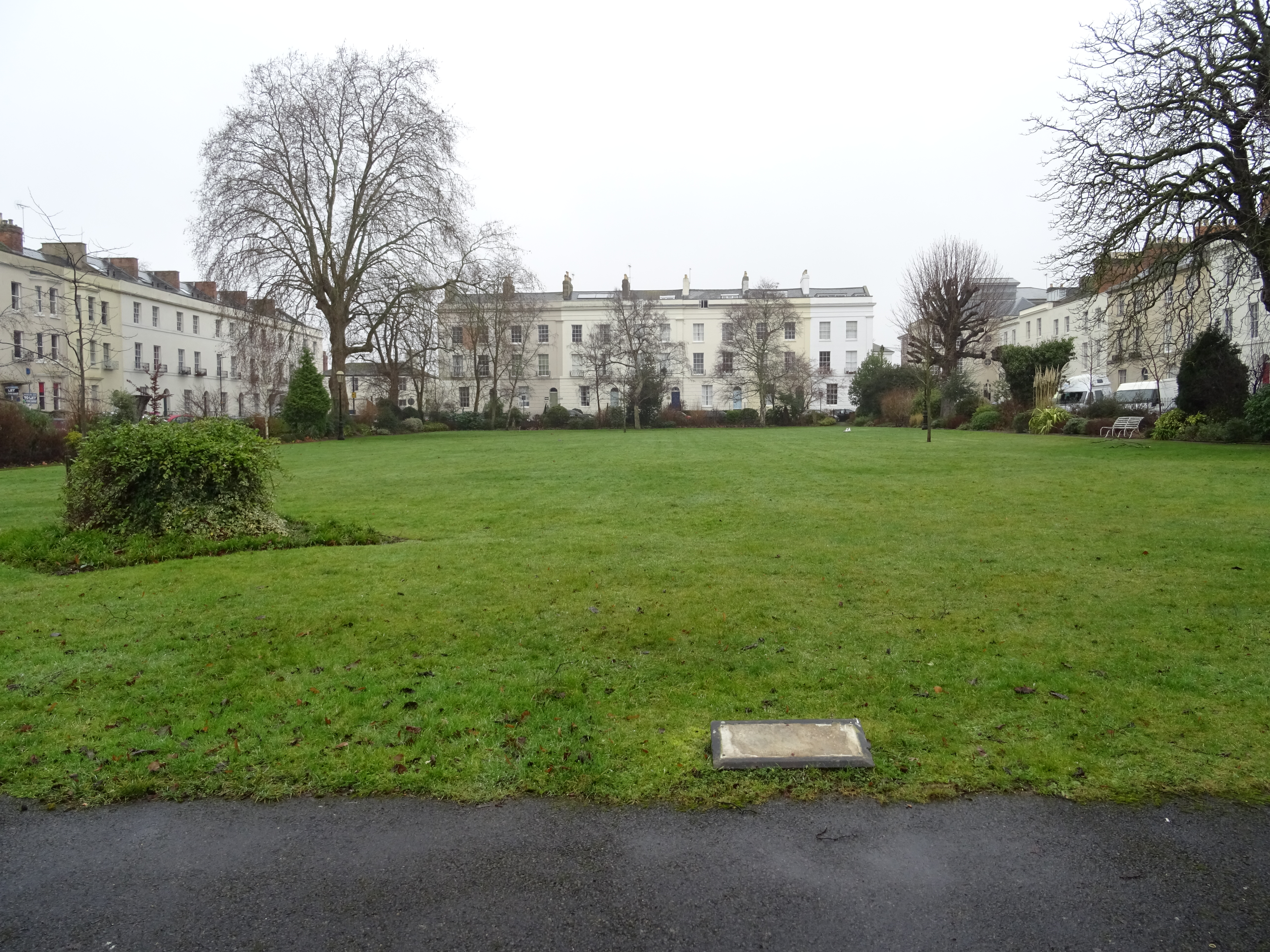
- Brunswick Square's public garden
- Design: Thomas Reece
- Opened: 1825
- Area: 1.5 acres (0.61 ha)
- Surface: Grass
- Owner: Brunswick Square Central Lawn Association
- Location: Gloucester, England
- Interactive map of Brunswick Square
- Coordinates: 51.861°N 2.248°W

Brunswick Square is a 1.5-acre (0.61 ha) privately owned public garden with residential streets along three of its sides, in the English city of Gloucester. It is overlooked by the Christ Church to the east on Brunswick Road. The square is surrounded by terraced houses and flats with the Gloucester National Spiritualist Church on the north side and Gloucester House on the south side. There are nine grade listed buildings around the square. The square has been part of the Eastgate and St Michaels conservation area since 1968.

== History ==
The square dates back to the Roman era when it was known as the Gaudy Green, which originated from the Latin term "Gaudium" which means to enjoy. Archaeological excavations of the site have found a Roman graveyard to the north, next to the Chillingworth Mews housing estate, which is likely to have extended into the square. Albion Street to the west is also believed to be of Roman origin. During the Elizabethan era, the city's stocks were present on the green. It was also used for leisure, as archery was practised here.

In 1643, an army camp was established on the green by the King's troops during the English Civil War. Prince Rupert led the royalist troops in a siege of Gloucester which was parliamentarian at this time. From the green the royalists dug tunnels under the city walls to where Parliament Street is today. Three large cannons were also placed on the green and fired at the south gate of the city walls.

In the mid-1700s, the green was a red light district. At this time it was classed as the parish of Littleworth, which was the poorest region of the city. The houses were slums with no sanitation. The opening of the Gloucester and Sharpness Canal in 1827 and the development of Gloucester Docks bought more money into the city, so the green was sold by its then owner the Duke of Norfolk to private buyers. Between 1822 and 1825 the area was developed by Thomas Reece, an ironmonger. By 1825, 19 terrace houses had been built with the central area preserved as a garden. All the residents signed a deed of covenant on 15 April 1825 to ensure nothing could ever be built on the garden. The area became known as Brunswick Square, named after Caroline of Brunswick, the wife of George IV. A managing group to maintain the garden was also formed and is known as the Brunswick Square Central Lawn Association.

During World War II, the area became run-down and, in 1942, the metal railings were removed to support the war effort. In the 1960s, the city council wanted to turn the square into a car park, however the deed of covenant signed in 1825 prevented this from happening. In 2000, a £25,000 grant from the Gloucestershire Environmental Trust and Cory Environmental was used to restore the gardens.

== Royal Visits ==
On the 3 June 1909, Edward VII visited the square; it is believed around 10,000 school children were there to meet him. In the 1930s Princess Mary visited the YMCA at 18 Brunswick Square.

== Grade listed buildings on the Square ==
- 2 Brunswick Square
- 4–5 Brunswick Square
- 8–9 Brunswick Square
- 10 Brunswick Square
- 11 Brunswick Square
- 12–18 Brunswick Square
- 20–25 Brunswick Square
- 26–27 Brunswick Square
- 28 Brunswick Square
