= Gloucester First Spiritualist Church =

Coordinates: 51.8607387°N 2.2463468°W

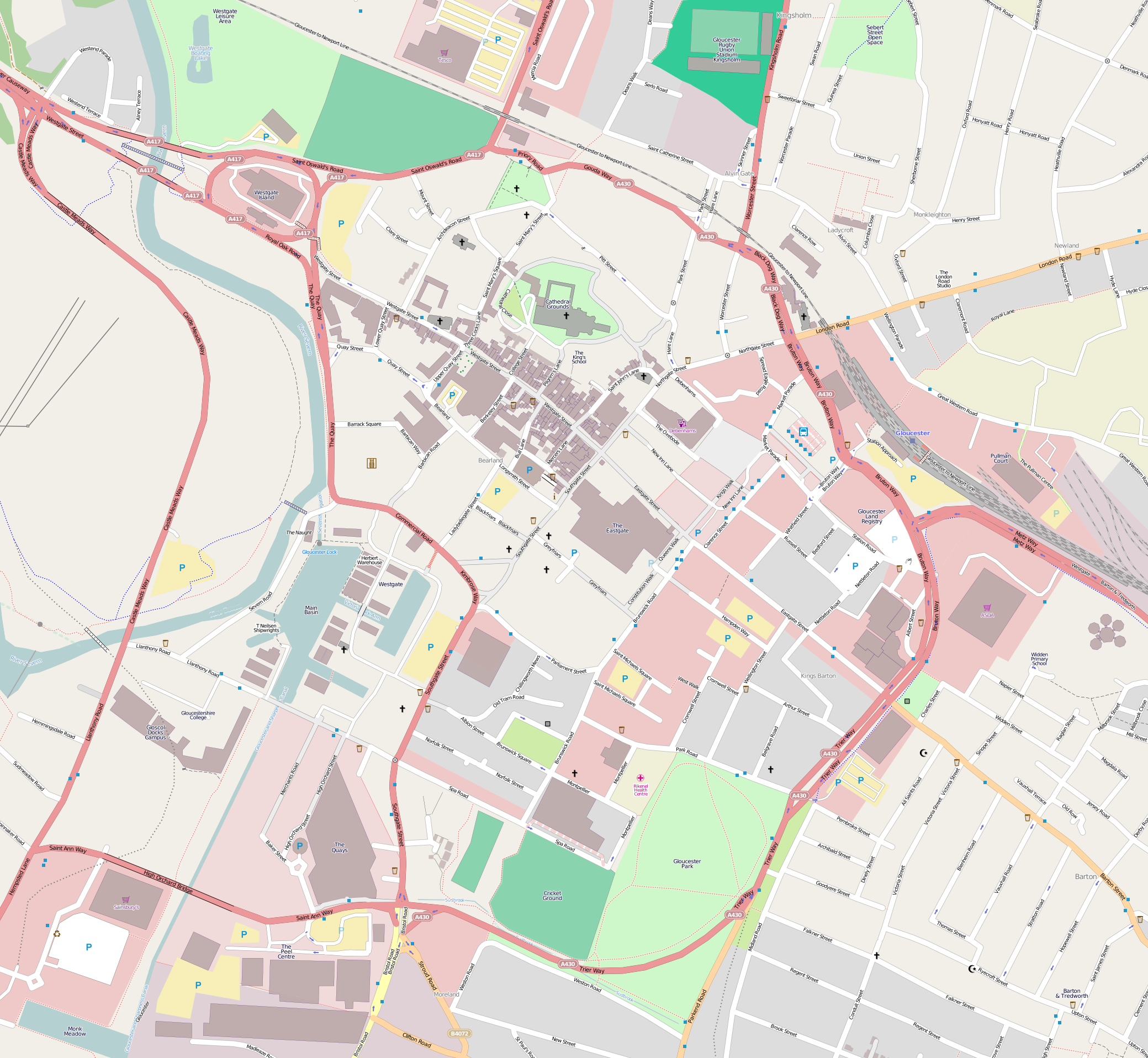
- Location in Gloucester
- Location: Gloucester
- Country: England
- Denomination: Spiritualism
- Website: http://gloucesterfirstspiritualistchurch.uk/

History
- Status: Spiritualist church
- Founded: 1939

Architecture
- Functional status: Active

Gloucester First Spiritualist Church is a spiritualist church in Henley Court in Gloucester, specifically a small building off Montpellier accessible through Montpellier Mews. It was founded in 1939.

== History ==
The first reported meeting of spiritualists in Gloucester was 1876. However, no official place of worship was founded until 1939, when the Gloucester Spiritualist Church met in Russell Street, as it was recorded in Kelly's directory. In April 1954, the church split and Gloucester National Spiritualist Church was formed. However, Gloucester Spiritualist Church still continued. In 1959, the church moved to its current site in Montpellier. In 1981, it became known as the Gloucester First Spiritualist Church.
