= Gloucester National Spiritualist Church =

Coordinates: 51.8613291°N 2.2476173°W

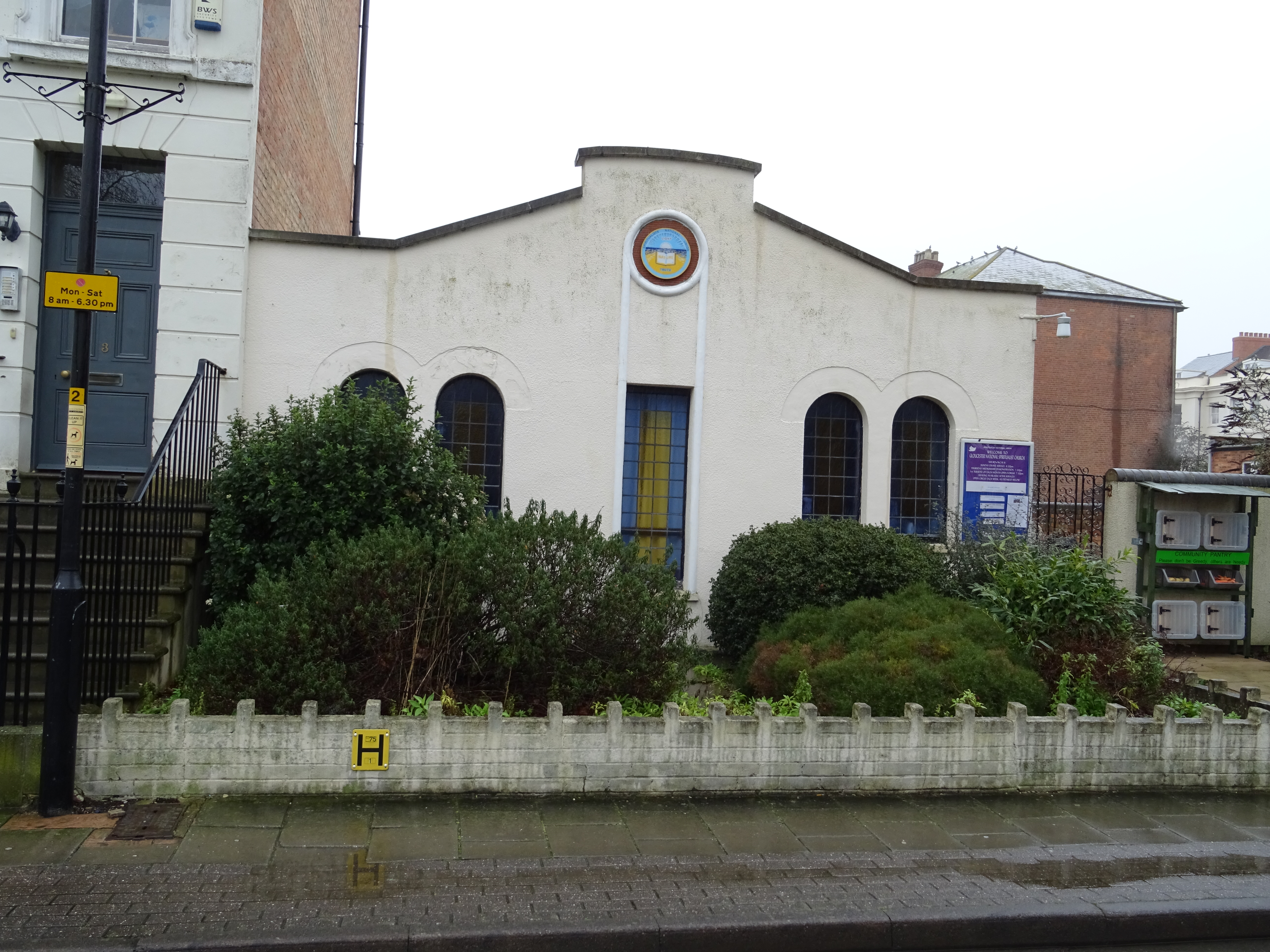

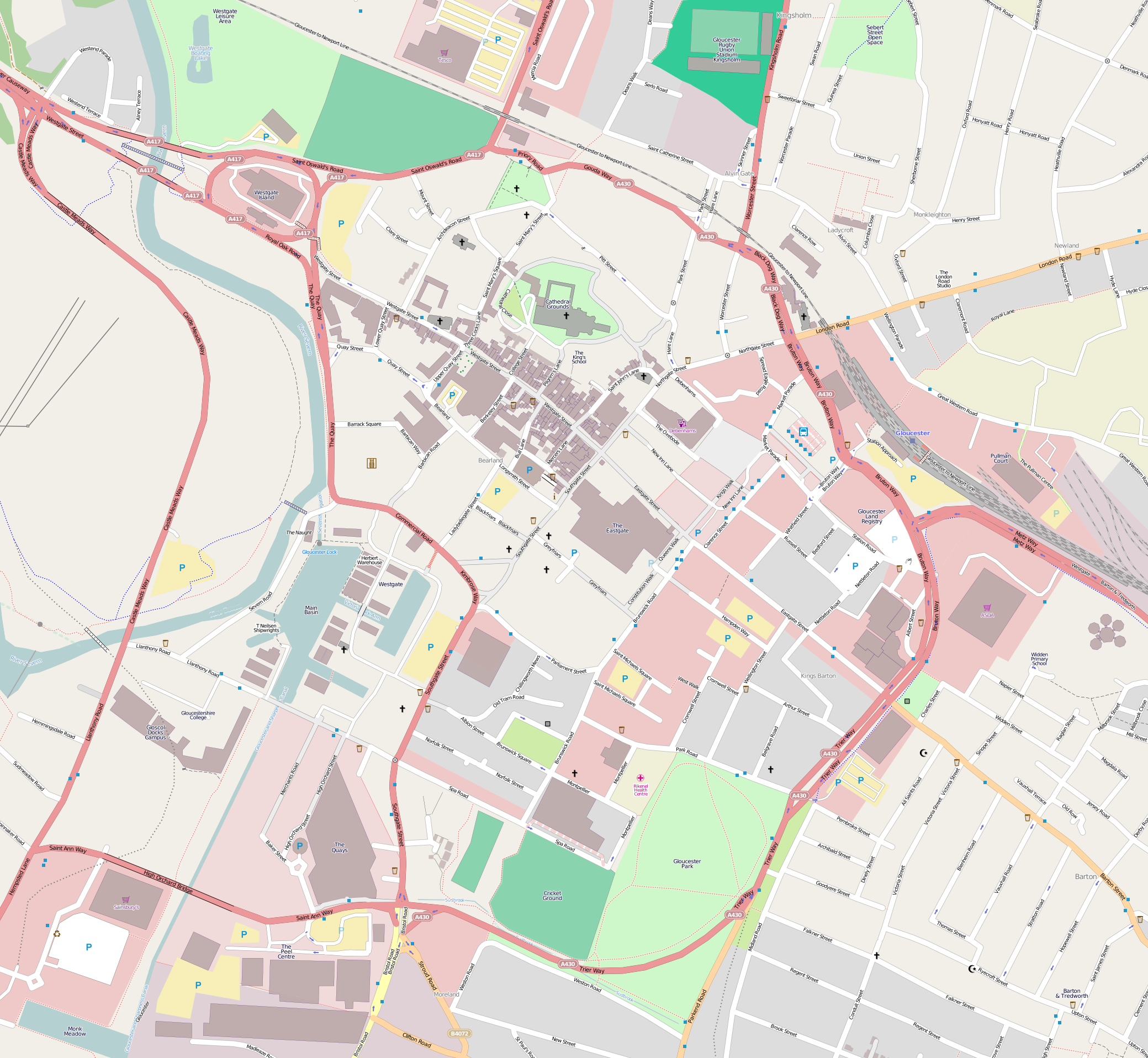
- Location in Gloucester
- Location: Gloucester
- Country: England
- Denomination: Spiritualism
- Website: http://gloucesternationalspiritualistchurch.org.uk/

History
- Status: Spiritualist church
- Founded: 1954

Architecture
- Functional status: Active

Gloucester National Spiritualist Church is a spiritualist church in Brunswick Square, Gloucester. It was founded in April 1954.

== History ==
Gloucester National Spiritualist Church was formed when the congregation split from the Gloucester First Spiritualist Church in April 1954. This was due to some people wanting to be members of the National Spiritualist Union, while others did not. Initially services were held in a basement room.

On Sunday 14 June 1959, the church committee were informed that a building with a meeting room was up for sale on Brunswick Square. This room was formerly used by the Christian Brethren. On Sunday 31 March 1962, the new church building was opened. In 1979, gas central heating was installed and, in 1981, a water supply was installed.
