= Wedding of Princess Mary and Henry Lascelles =

1922 British royal wedding

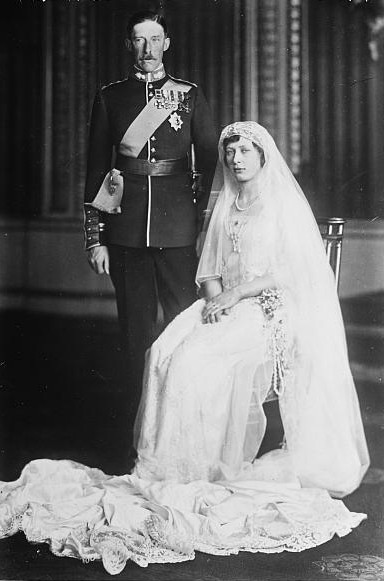
- Date: 28 February 1922; 104 years ago
- Venue: Westminster Abbey
- Location: London, England, United Kingdom
- Participants: Princess Mary; Henry Lascelles, Viscount Lascelles

The wedding of Princess Mary (later Princess Royal), and Henry Lascelles, Viscount Lascelles (later 6th Earl of Harewood) took place on Tuesday, 28 February 1922, at Westminster Abbey. The bride was the only daughter of King George V, while the groom was a member of the Lascelles family.

== Engagement ==
Mary and Lascelles's relationship began after meeting at the Grand National and at a house party in 1921. After being invited to stay with the royal family at Balmoral Castle and Sandringham House, he proposed to her on 20 November 1921 at York Cottage.

== Wedding ==
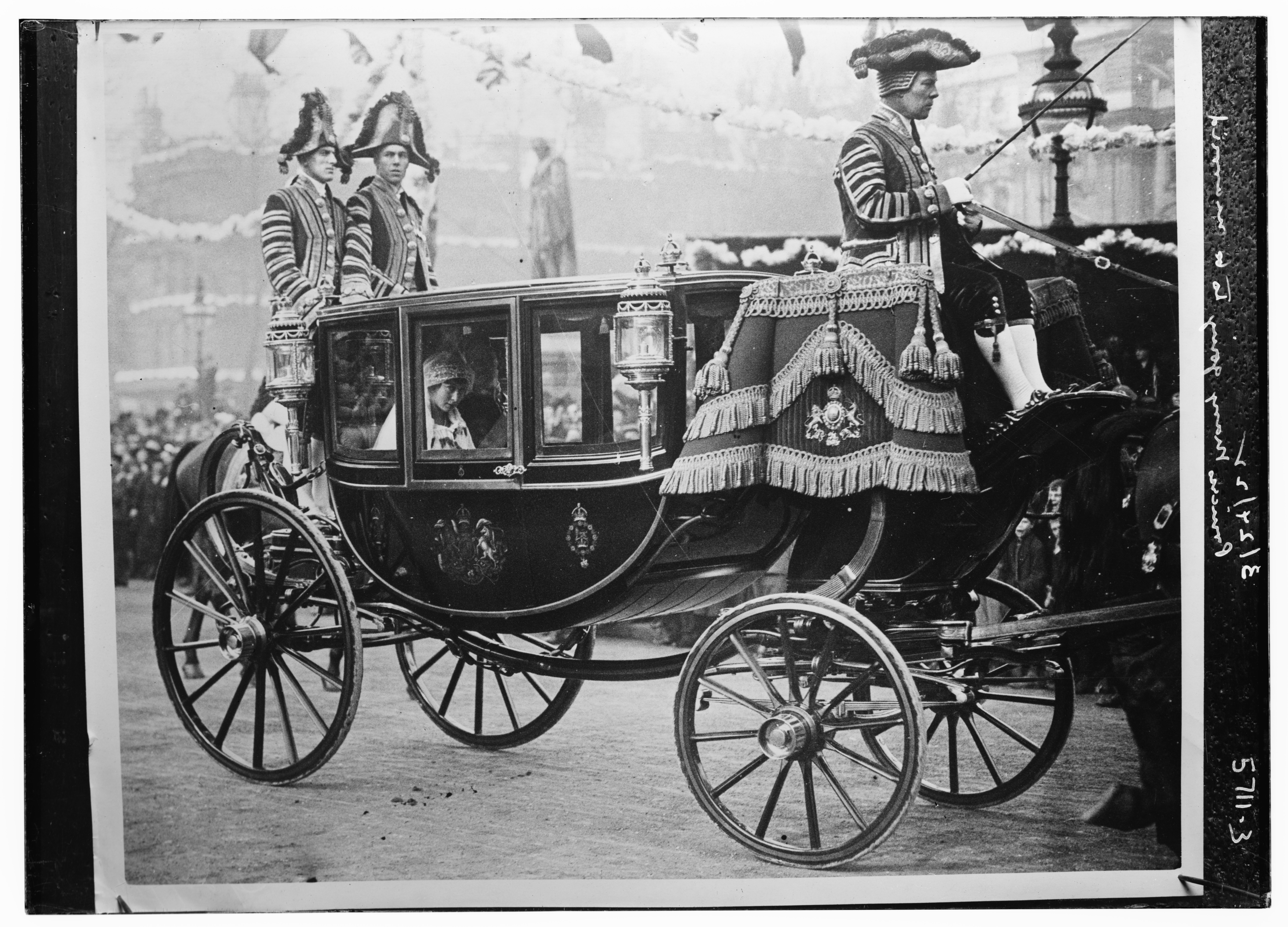
Mary on her way to the abbey

Their wedding was held at Westminster Abbey, and attracted large crowds along the route between the abbey and Buckingham Palace. It was the first wedding of the child of a monarch to be held at Westminster Abbey since Margaret of England married John II, Duke of Brabant. Many spent the night on the streets despite the cold weather to catch a glimpse of the couple on the wedding day. Men wounded in the First World War were provided with special accommodations to view the procession. Queen Mary was accompanied by her sons Prince Albert, Prince Henry, and Prince George on her way to the abbey. The Prince of Wales was not present at the ceremony (he was conducting a visit to India). The bride and the King made their way to the abbey in the Glass coach. The procession went along The Mall, passed Admiralty Arch and went down Whitehall. The Household Cavalry took part in the procession and the route was lined with battalions from the Grenadier Guards, Coldstream Guards, Scots Guards, and Welsh Guards, and the representative detachments of the London territorial divisions.

2,000 guests were invited for the wedding ceremony. There was "a stir and hurrying whisper" when Prime Minister David Lloyd George moved himself across the aisle to a prominent seat. Queen Alexandra arrived first, followed by Queen Mary and her sons, and ultimately the King and his daughter Mary. The service began at 11:30 a.m. and was conducted by the Archbishop of Canterbury, the Archbishop of York, the Bishop of London, and the Dean of Westminster. The Gold used for making the wedding ring came from a mine in Wales.

Vandyk took the formal photographs and Frank O. Salisbury was commissioned by the King to paint a picture of the ceremony at the abbey which took years to complete.

=== Music ===
Psalm 67 was sung to music by T. Tertius Noble. After the Archbishop of Canterbury's address the hymn "Praise, my soul, the King of heaven" was sung. Before the signing of the register the National Anthem was sung. The recessional music was "Wedding March" from A Midsummer Night's Dream by Felix Mendelssohn.

=== Attendants ===
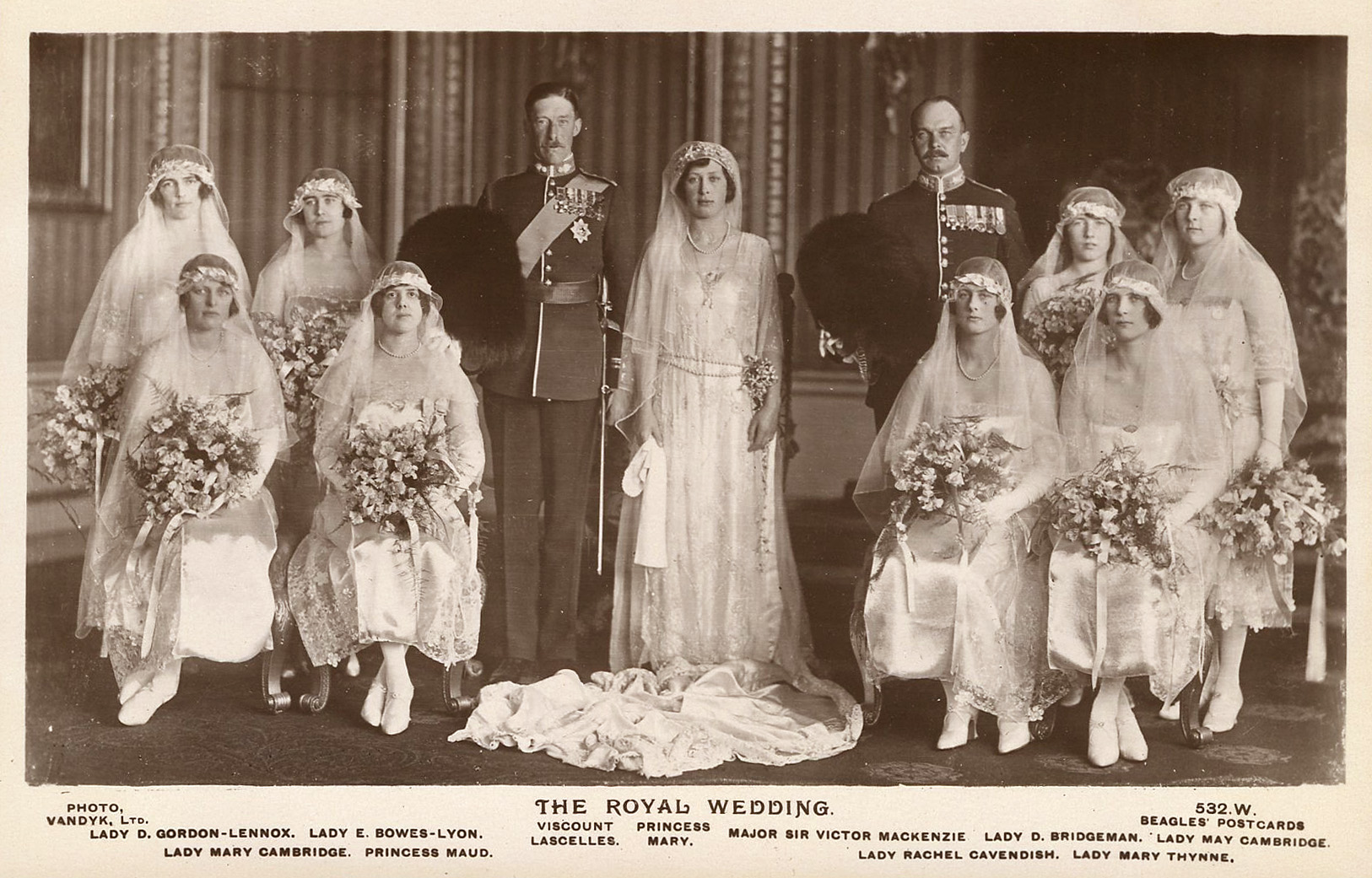
Princess Mary and Viscount Lascelles with the best man and the bridesmaids. Back row left to right: Lady Doris Gordon-Lennox, Lady Elizabeth Bowes-Lyon, Viscount Lascelles, Princess Mary, Major Sir Victor Mackenzie, Lady Diana Bridgeman, Lady May Cambridge. Seated left to right: Lady Mary Cambridge, Princess Maud, Lady Rachel Cavendish, Lady Mary Thynne.

The bride's attendants were:

- Lady Elizabeth Bowes-Lyon, daughter of the Earl of Strathmore and Kinghorne
- Princess Maud, daughter of the Princess Royal and the bride's paternal first cousin
- Lady Mary Cambridge, daughter of the Marquess of Cambridge and the bride's maternal first cousin
- Lady May Cambridge, daughter of the Earl of Athlone and Princess Alice, Countess of Athlone, and the bride's maternal first cousin and paternal second cousin
- Lady Diana Bridgeman, daughter of the Earl of Bradford and the groom’s maternal first cousin once removed
- Lady Mary Thynne, daughter of the Marquess of Bath
- Lady Rachel Cavendish, daughter of the Duke of Devonshire
- Lady Doris Gordon-Lennox, daughter of the Duke of Richmond

This was the first royal occasion in which Lady Elizabeth Bowes-Lyon, a friend of Princess Mary, participated, as one of the bridesmaids. She later married Mary's brother, Prince Albert, and became queen consort of the United Kingdom upon his accession in 1936.

=== Attire ===
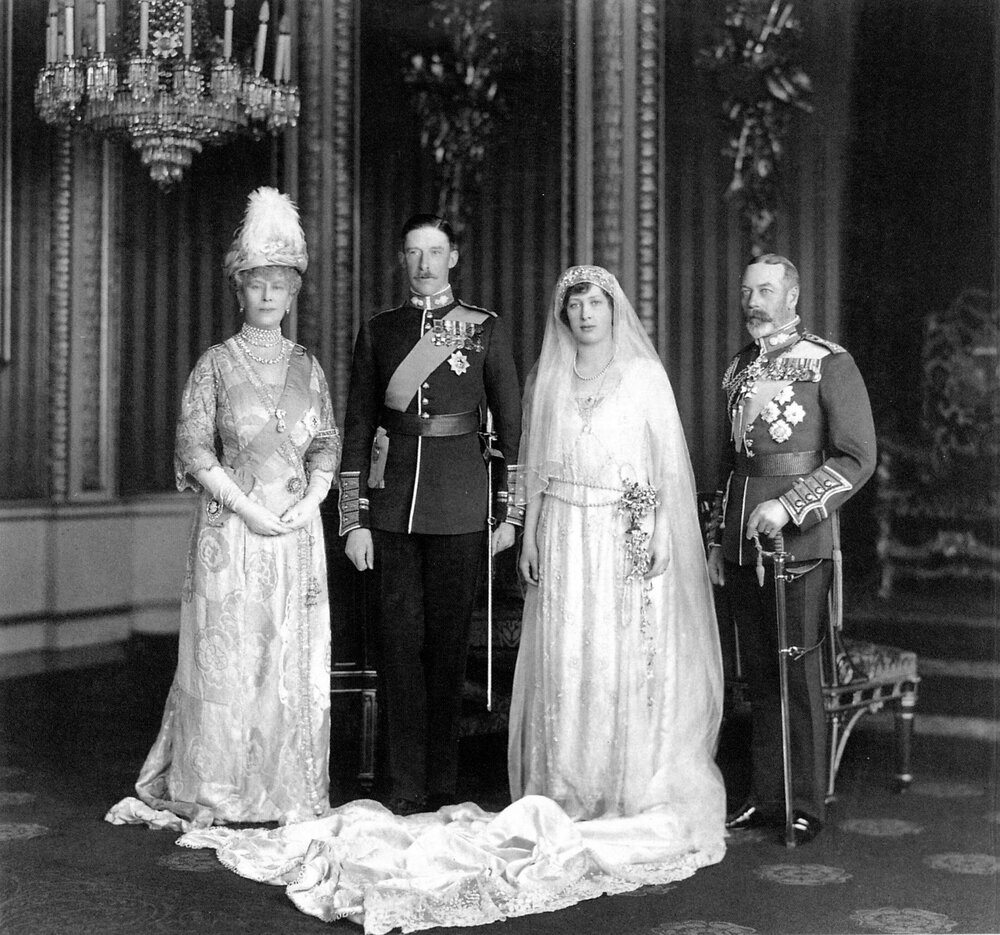
Mary and Lascelles, along with Mary's parents, posing for a photograph

Mary's wedding dress was designed by William Wallace Terry for Messrs. Reville, Ltd. The dress was constructed of cloth of silver, with an ivory silk train. It combined "youthful simplicity with royal splendour". It was designed to reflect "Britain's position as ruler of a vast empire; emblematic lotus-flower motifs embroidered in India featured alongside a domestic, yet equally symbolic, trellis work of roses in pearls and crystal beads." The silk was brought by Queen Mary from India when she visited the country in 1911. Embroidered on the overdress was the Tudor rose. The train was four yards in length and of brocade embroidered with lotus flower for India, maple leaf for Canada, wattle for Australia, and fern for New Zealand. At the shoulders, the train was trimmed with Honiton lace gifted by Queen Mary. Instead of wearing a tiara, Mary wore three strands of orange blossom that secured a veil outlined with pearls. In terms of jewellery, Mary wore a diamond and pearl brooch, a gift from the bridegroom; on her bodice she wore the brooch given to her by the Royal Scots. She wore an ermine stole over her dress en route to the Abbey. The bridesmaids all wore cloth of silver over ivory satin and identical brooches with the initials M and H given to them by Lascelles. Their veils were secured by silver bands. The groom wore the uniform of the Grenadier Guards and the blue sash of the Order of the Garter.

The ceremony was the first royal wedding to be covered in fashion magazines, including Vogue. The "newly-conserved train of Princess Mary's wedding dress, embroidered with emblematic flowers of the British Empire, alongside her bridal slippers and a floral headdress" were on exhibition at Harewood House, the seat of the Earls of Harewood, in September 2019.

=== Gifts ===
A gift fund was set up by the public ahead of the wedding. Guests had a private viewing of the gifts received by the couple at Buckingham Palace before they were exhibited at St James's Palace.

=== Coverage ===
The abbey authorities set up a camera to capture pictures of the couple as they left, with proceeds from selling them going to the abbey's Restoration Fund. Pictures of the wedding were also shown at cinema halls. Westminster Hospital also put up a small stand to show pictures of the wedding and added £2,000 to its fund.

== Aftermath ==
After the wedding, the couple proceeded back to Buckingham Palace. The carriage carrying the bride and the groom stopped at The Cenotaph, where Mary handed a bouquet of flowers to a Grenadier guard who placed it at the memorial's foot as crowds stood silent. At the palace, they appeared on the balcony together with the King, the Queen, and Queen Alexandra. The King also hosted 100 people for breakfast. The wedding cake had three tiers and featured floral decorations. In the afternoon the couple left for Paddington station and boarded a train to Weston Park, the ancestral seat of the groom's maternal family. They then travelled to Italy and France, where they stayed at the home of the 8th Earl of Granard in Paris. Mary was later quoted to have said: "It is a great happiness to me that I am to remain in my native land."
