= Mary, Princess Royal and Countess of Harewood =

British princess (1897–1965)

Mary
- Princess Royal; Countess of Harewood
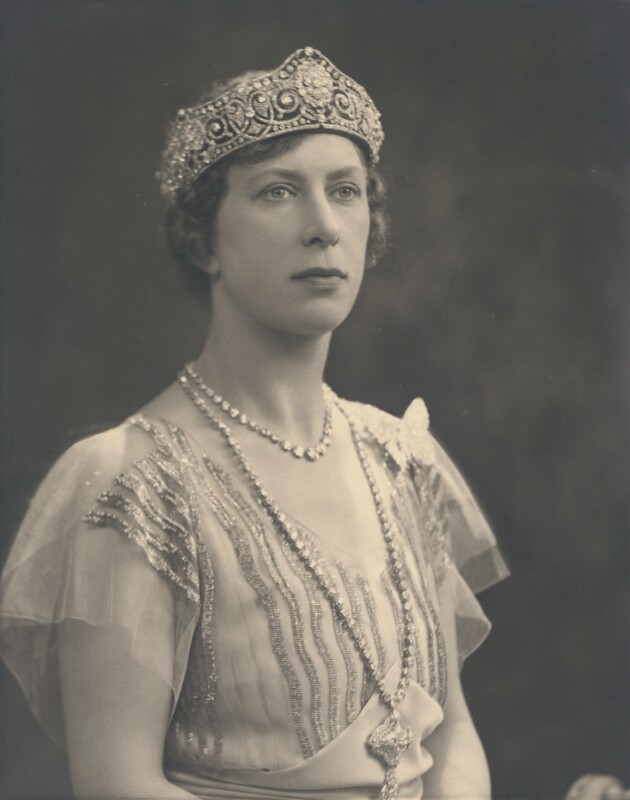
- Formal portrait c. 1932
- Born: Princess Mary of York; 25 April 1897; York Cottage, Sandringham, Norfolk, England
- Died: 28 March 1965 (aged 67); Harewood House, Yorkshire, England
- Burial: 1 April 1965; All Saints' Church, Harewood, Yorkshire
- Spouse: Henry Lascelles, 6th Earl of Harewood (m. 1922; died 1947)
- Issue: George Lascelles, 7th Earl of Harewood; Gerald Lascelles
Names
- Victoria Alexandra Alice Mary
- House: Saxe-Coburg and Gotha (until 1917); Windsor (from 1917)
- Father: George V
- Mother: Mary of Teck

Mary, Princess Royal (Victoria Alexandra Alice Mary; 25 April 1897 – 28 March 1965), was a member of the British royal family. She was the only daughter of King George V and Queen Mary, the sister of kings Edward VIII and George VI, and the paternal aunt of Queen Elizabeth II. During the First World War, she undertook extensive charity work in support of servicemen and their families. In 1922, she married Henry Lascelles, Viscount Lascelles (later the 6th Earl of Harewood), and they had two sons, George Lascelles, 7th Earl of Harewood, and Gerald David Lascelles. Mary was granted the title Princess Royal in 1932. During the Second World War, she served as Controller Commandant of the Auxiliary Territorial Service.

== Early life and education ==
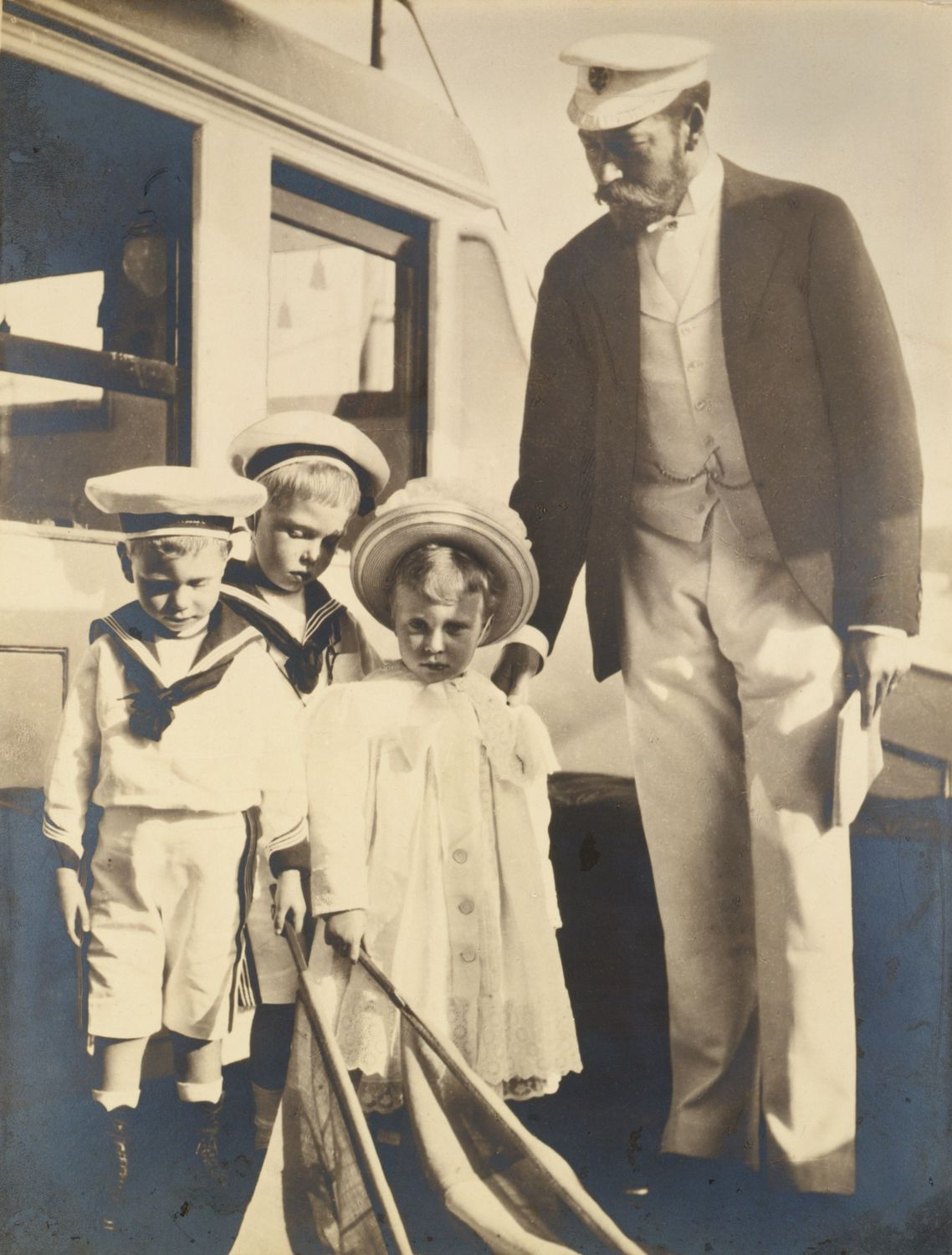
Mary (second from right) with her father and older brothers, Edward and Albert. Photograph by her grandmother Alexandra, 1899

Mary was born at 3:30 pm on 25 April 1897 at York Cottage on the Sandringham Estate in Norfolk, during the reign of her great-grandmother Queen Victoria. She was the third child and only daughter of the Duke and Duchess of York, later King George V and Queen Mary. Her father was the only surviving son of the Prince and Princess of Wales, later King Edward VII and Queen Alexandra, and her mother was the eldest child and only daughter of the Duke and Duchess of Teck. She was named Victoria Alexandra Alice Mary after her paternal great-grandmother Queen Victoria; her paternal grandmother, Alexandra, Princess of Wales; her maternal grandmother, Mary Adelaide, Duchess of Teck; and her great-aunt, Alice, Grand Duchess of Hesse and by Rhine, with whom she shared a birthday. She was known by the last of her given names, Mary. At the time of her birth she was fifth in the line of succession to the British throne after her grandfather, father, and elder brothers Edward (later Edward VIII) and Albert (later George VI), and moved down the line following the births of her younger brothers Henry, George, and John.

She was baptised at St Mary Magdalene's Church near Sandringham on 7 June by William Dalrymple Maclagan, Archbishop of York. Her godparents were the Queen (her great-grandmother), the King of the Hellenes (her paternal great-uncle), the Dowager Empress of Russia (her paternal great-aunt), the Prince and Princess of Wales (her paternal grandparents), the Duchess of Teck (her maternal grandmother), Princess Victoria of Wales (her paternal aunt), and Prince Francis of Teck (her maternal uncle). Her grandfather succeeded to the throne in 1901 when Mary was three years old.

Mary was educated by governesses, although she shared some lessons with her brothers Edward, Albert, and Henry. She became fluent in German and French, and developed a lifelong interest in horses and horse racing. Her first state appearance took place at the coronation of her parents at Westminster Abbey on 22 June 1911.

== Charity work ==
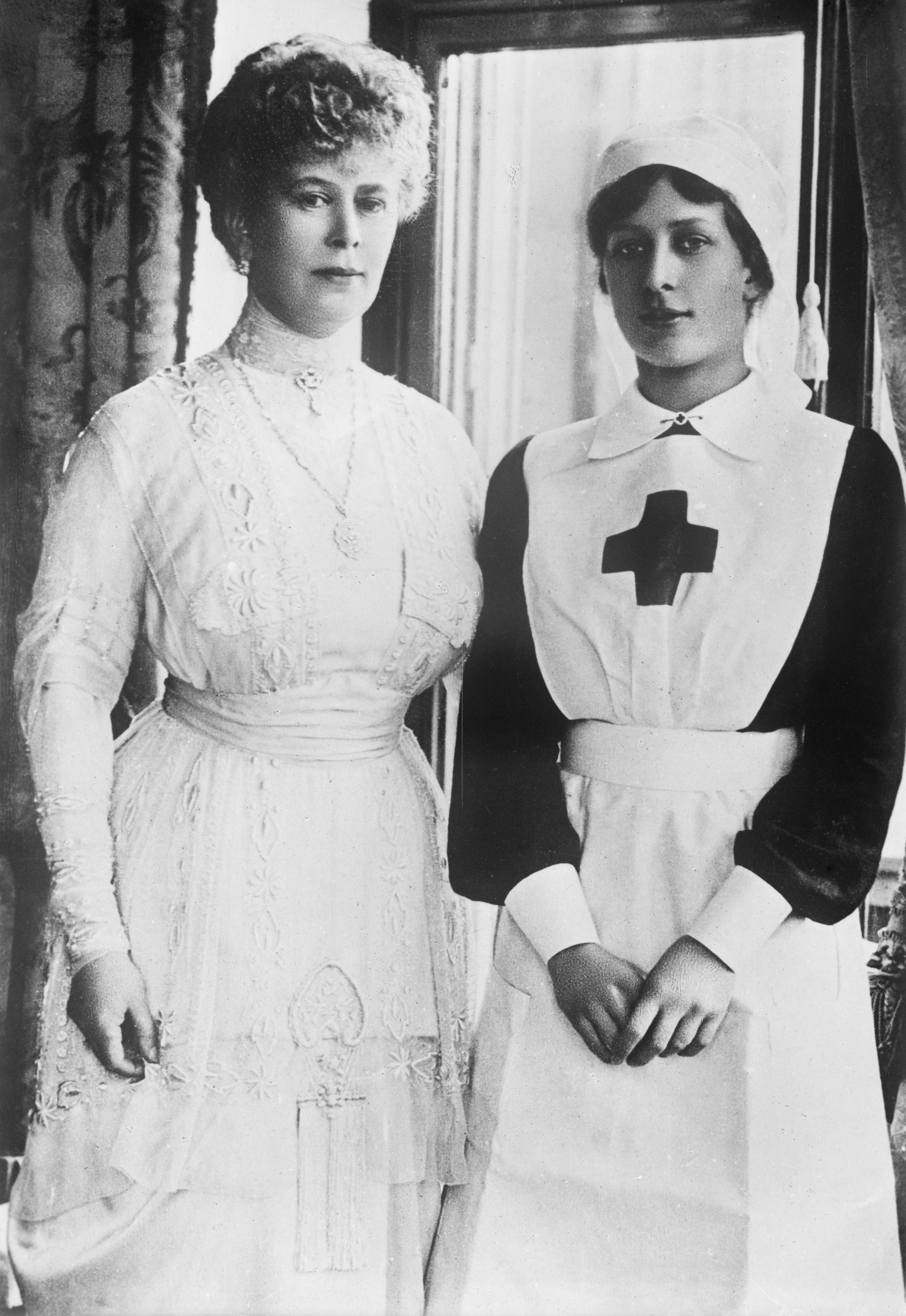
Mary (right) with her mother Queen Mary during the First World War

During World War I, Mary visited hospitals and welfare organisations with her mother, assisting with schemes that provided comfort to British servicemen and support to their families. One such initiative was Princess Mary's Christmas gift Fund, through which gifts worth £100,000 were distributed to serving soldiers and sailors for Christmas 1914, the equivalent of £9.55 million in 2023. She took an active role in promoting the Girl Guide movement, the Voluntary Aid Detachments, and the Women's Land Army. In June 1918, following an announcement in The Gentlewoman, she began a nursing course at Great Ormond Street Hospital, working two days a week in the Alexandra Ward.

In 1918, she was appointed colonel-in-chief of the Royal Scots, an honour bestowed by her father, the King. On 20 November 1918, she became the first member of the royal family to visit France following the Armistice. She visited centres associated with Queen Alexandra's Imperial Military Nursing Service and Voluntary Aid Detachment Units, as well as hospitals treating wounded soldiers. While visiting Ypres she recognised two soldiers from the Royal Scots; the regiment was stationed nearby, and a march‑past of its 17th battalion was arranged. During her visit to Le Tréport, she rode in a whippet tank, which the Yorkshire Evening Post described as a "great experience".

Mary's public duties reflected her interest in nursing, the Girl Guide movement, and the Women's Services. In the period leading up to her marriage, girls and women across the British Empire named Mary or its variants (including Marie, May, and Miriam) formed "The Marys of the Empire", and contributed to a wedding present fund. She presented this fund to the Girl Guides Association for the purchase of the Foxlease estate, and after the exhibition of her wedding presents she donated half the proceeds to the same cause, a total of £10,000, which enabled the project to proceed.

She became honorary president of the British Girl Guide Association in 1920, a position she held until her death. In 1925, she received the Silver Fish Award, the organisation's highest adult honour, in recognition of her contribution to the movement. In 1958, she became president of the Guide Club.

In July 2013, it was reported that British Pathé had identified newsreel film from 1927 showing the ancestors of Catherine Middleton, as Lord Mayors of Leeds, hosting Mary at the Young Women's Christian Association in Hunslet. Sir Charles Lupton and his brother Hugh Lupton, uncles of Olive Middleton, Catherine's great‑grandmother, were among those present.

In 1921, Mary became the first patron of the Not Forgotten Association, a role she held until her death in 1965. The charity's first Christmas tea party was organised by her and held at St James's Palace in 1921, when she invited 600 wounded servicemen for afternoon tea; the event has been held annually ever since. In 1926, she became commandant-in-chief of the British Red Cross Detachments.

In the 1920s, Mary was a patron of the Leeds Triennial Musical Festival. By the 1940s, she was attending opening nights and many of the festival's performances, as was her son, George, and his wife, the Countess of Harewood, née Marion Stein, a former concert pianist. George was a noted music critic whose career included serving as artistic director of the Leeds Triennial Musical Festival.

In 1931, Mary was appointed patron of the Yorkshire Ladies Council of Education. She was also patron of the Girls' Patriotic Union of Day Schools.

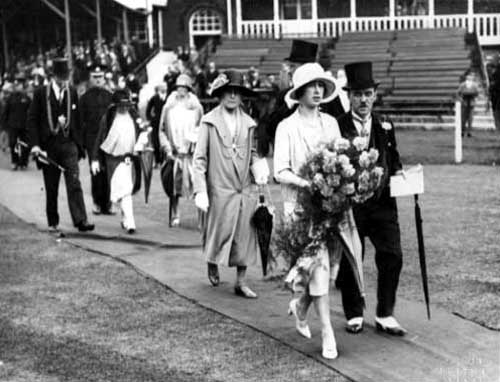
Mary leads local dignitaries (including Olive Middleton, in white hat and fur shawl) in a procession in Headingley, Leeds in 1927

In July 1927, it was reported that, at a garden party at Headingley Cricket Ground, Mary was served tea alongside dignitaries who included members of the Middleton family; Olive Middleton, great-grandmother of Catherine, Princess of Wales, was among them. Mary and her son, George, were patrons of the Yorkshire Symphony Orchestra which performed soirées at their home, Harewood House. Among those attending was the orchestra's co-founder, Richard Noël Middleton, who was on friendly terms with Mary. Middleton's wife, Olive, served on Mary's fundraising committee for the Leeds General Infirmary. Olive's first cousin, Elinor G. Lupton, also served on the committee and reportedly launched the fundraising appeal in 1933. The committee's vice-presidents included Mary's sister-in-law, the Hon. Mrs Edward Lascelles, who served alongside Olive and her relative Jessie Beatrice Kitson. In 1936, Mary became patron of the Leeds Infirmary.

== Marriage and family ==
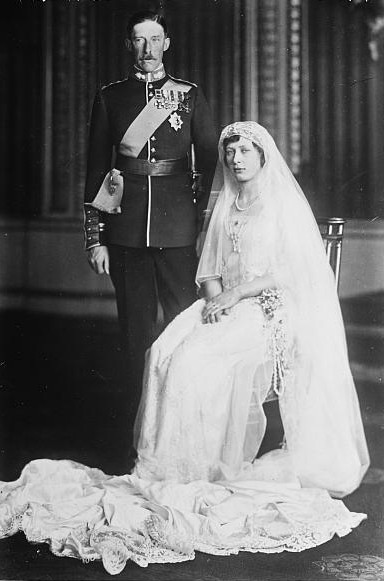
A 1922 wedding portrait of Mary and Henry, Viscount Lascelles.

On 28 February 1922, Mary married Henry, Viscount Lascelles, the elder son of the 5th Earl of Harewood and his wife, Lady Florence Bridgeman, daughter of the 3rd Earl of Bradford of Weston Park. Mary was 24 years old, while the groom was 39.

Their wedding was held at Westminster Abbey and attracted large crowds along the route to Buckingham Palace. The ceremony was the first royal wedding to be covered in fashion magazines, including Vogue. Mary's gown was designed by Messrs Raville and featured emblems of Britain and India. It was also the first royal occasion in which Lady Elizabeth Bowes-Lyon, a friend of Mary, participated as one of the bridesmaids. She later married Mary's brother, Albert, and became queen consort of the United Kingdom upon his accession in 1936.

Mary and Henry had two sons:

- George Lascelles, 7th Earl of Harewood (7 February 1923 – 11 July 2011); married, 1949, Marion Stein; had issue; divorced 1967; married, 1967, Patricia Elizabeth Tuckwell; had issue.
- The Honourable Gerald Lascelles (21 August 1924 – 27 February 1998); married, 1952, Angela Dowding; had issue; divorced 1978; married Elizabeth Collingwood; had issue.

=== Residences ===
Mary and her husband had homes in London (first Chesterfield House in South Audley Street, and later 32 Green Street, Mayfair) and in Yorkshire (first Goldsborough Hall, and later Harewood House).

==== London ====
Prior to their marriage, Henry had purchased a palatial London townhouse, Chesterfield House in South Audley Street, for £140,000. Chesterfield House served as the couple's London residence for the first nine years of their marriage. In 1931, King George V and Queen Mary purchased 32 Green Street, Mayfair, as a London home for their daughter, rendering Chesterfield House surplus to the couple's needs. Mary and Henry vacated Chesterfield House in early 1932.

Queen Mary reportedly expressed an interest in purchasing 32 Green Street as a London home for her daughter in 1931, and consent was obtained from the property's owner, Hugh Grosvenor, 2nd Duke of Westminster, with the proviso that the Grosvenor Estates could maintain the right to repurchase the house at a future date if its use as a royal residence ceased. The couple continued to occupy 32 Green Street when in London until the outbreak of war in 1939. The house was repurchased by the Grosvenor Estate in 1946, and was later repurposed as the Embassy of Brazil.

Following the outbreak World War II, Mary was granted the use of a grace‑and‑favour apartment at St James's Palace, which remained her official London residence for the rest of her life.

London Homes of Princess Mary and Lord Harewood

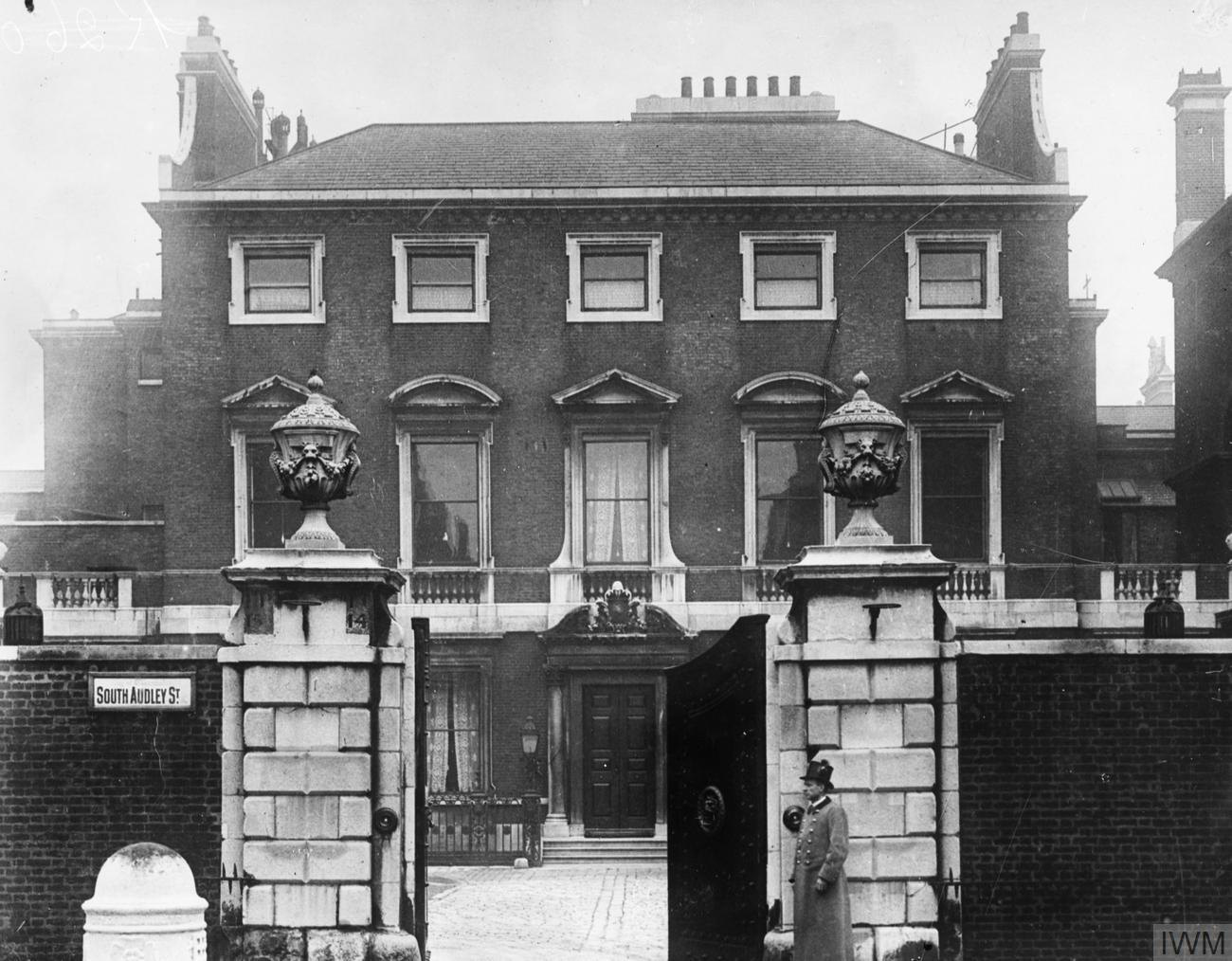
Chesterfield House, Mayfair (1917) – owned by Lord Harewood between 1918 and 1934

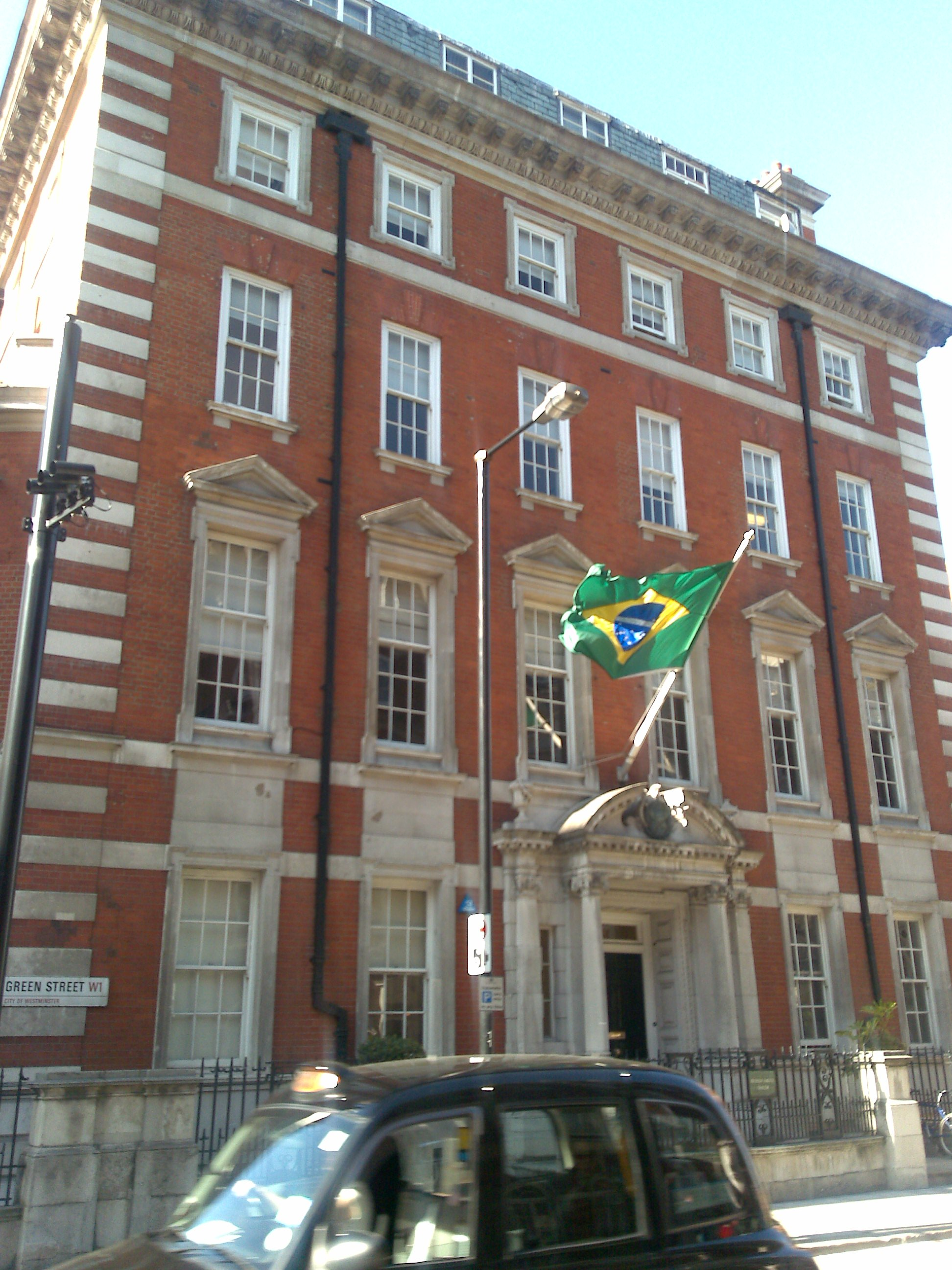
32 Green Street, Mayfair – Princess Mary and Lord Harewood's London residence between 1932 and 1939

==== Yorkshire ====
Following their marriage, Princess Mary and Lord Lascelles established their country residence at Goldsborough Hall in North Yorkshire. The house was the Harewood Estate's Dower house, although by the time of the couple's marriage it had been leased to tenants, who vacated the property in April 1922. While at Goldsborough Hall, Mary commissioned internal alterations by the architect Sydney Kitson to suit the upbringing of her two children, and she instigated the development of formal beech‑hedge‑lined borders extending from the south terrace for a quarter of a mile down an avenue of lime trees. The limes were planted by her relatives as they visited the hall throughout the 1920s, including her father, King George, and her mother, Queen Mary.

Following the death of Princess Mary's father-in-law Henry Lascelles, 5th Earl of Harewood in 1929, her husband succeeded as the 6th Earl of Harewood and inherited the Lascelles' family seat, Harewood House; the family took up residence at Harewood during the months following the 5th Earl's death. Princess Mary took a keen interest in the interior decoration and renovation of Harewood House, and during the 1930s some £44,000 was spent on internal renovation and modernisation works.

=== Interests ===
She became an expert in cattle breeding and served on the board of trustees of the Royal Agricultural Society of England, of which her husband had been president. In December 2012, some of Mary's belongings were sold in "Harewood: Collecting in the Royal Tradition", an auction organised by Christie's.

In the first half of the 20th century, Mary occasionally rode with the Bramham Moor Hunt – Henry was Master of the Hunt – and she entertained many horse-racing enthusiasts at Harewood house parties for the race meetings at Wetherby and York.

== Princess Royal ==
On 6 October 1929, Henry succeeded his father as 6th Earl of Harewood, having previously been created a Knight of the Garter upon his marriage. On 1 January 1932, George V declared that Mary should bear the title Princess Royal, succeeding her aunt Princess Louise, Duchess of Fife, who had died a year earlier.

Mary was particularly close to her eldest brother, the Prince of Wales, known as David to his family, who became Edward VIII upon the death of their father in 1936. After the abdication crisis, Mary and Henry went to stay with the former Edward VIII, by then created Duke of Windsor, at Enzesfeld Castle near Vienna. Later, in November 1947, she allegedly declined to attend the wedding of her niece, Princess Elizabeth, to Lieutenant Philip Mountbatten as the Duke of Windsor had not been invited. She gave ill health as the official reason for her non-attendance. In March 1953, she cut short her tour of the West Indies and, before returning to London, made a surprise diversion to New York, where she met the Duke and Duchess of Windsor. She posed for photographs with them before she and the duke boarded the ship on which they travelled to visit their ailing mother, Queen Mary.

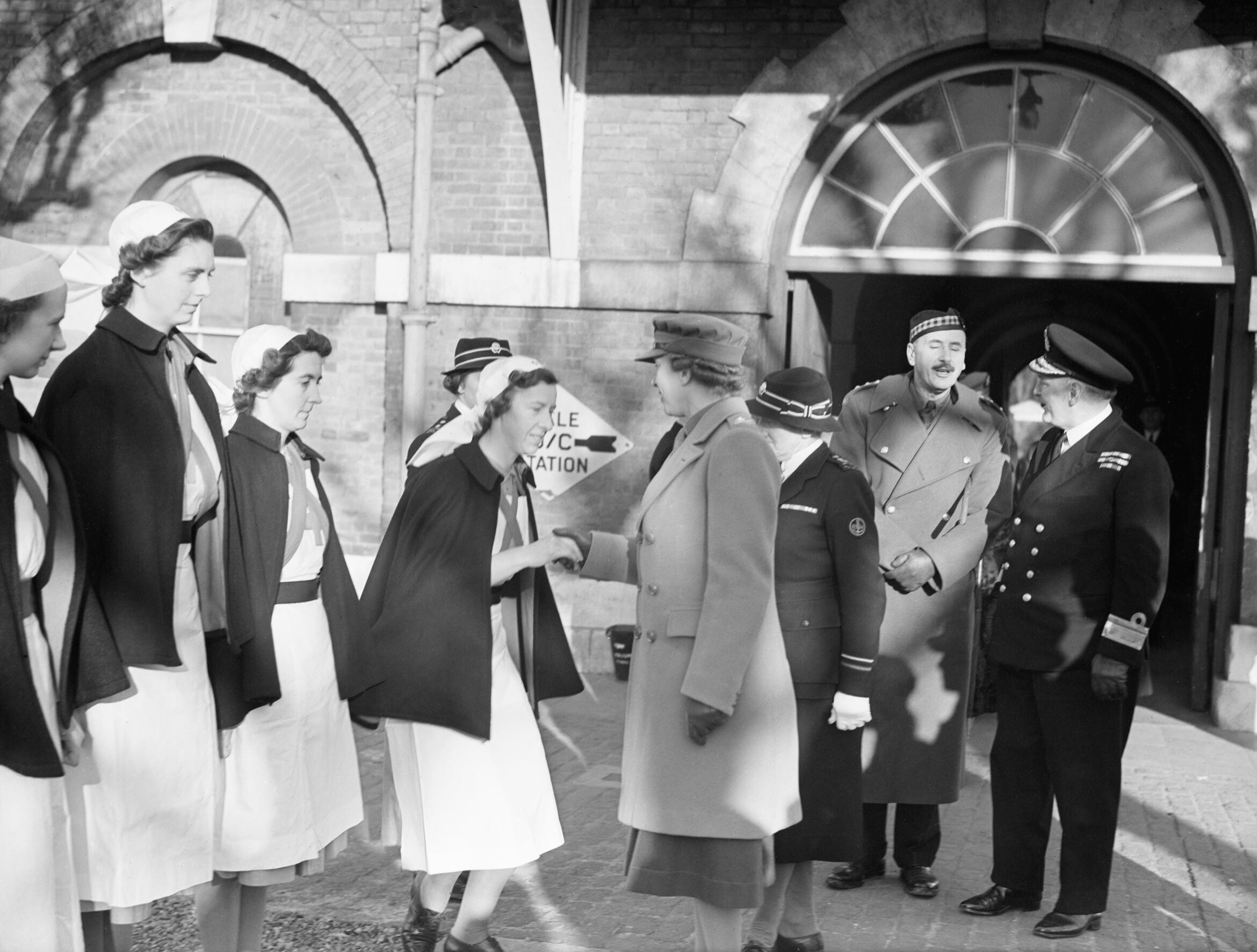
Mary visiting the Royal Hospital Haslar in 1943

At the outbreak of World War II, Mary became chief controller and later controller commandant of the Auxiliary Territorial Service, renamed the Women's Royal Army Corps in 1949. In that capacity, she travelled across the country, visiting its units, as well as wartime canteens and other welfare organisations. After the death in 1942 of her younger brother, the Duke of Kent, she became president of Papworth Hospital. Mary became air chief commandant of Princess Mary's Royal Air Force Nursing Service in 1950, and received the honorary rank of general in the British Army in 1956. Also, in 1949, the 10th Gurkha Rifles were renamed the 10th Princess Mary's Own Gurkha Rifles in her honour.

After Henry's death in 1947, Mary lived at Harewood House with her elder son and his family. She became chancellor of the University of Leeds in 1951 and continued to carry out official duties at home and abroad. She attended the coronation of Elizabeth II in June 1953, and later represented the Queen at the independence celebrations of Trinidad and Tobago in 1962, and Zambia in 1964. One of her last official engagements was to represent the Queen at the funeral of Queen Louise of Sweden in early March 1965. Mary visited her brother, the Duke of Windsor, at the London Clinic in March 1965, while he recovered from recent eye surgery. She also met his wife, the Duchess of Windsor, one of the few meetings between the Duchess and her husband's immediate family.

== Death and legacy ==
Mary suffered a fatal heart attack in the grounds of the Harewood House estate on 28 March 1965 while walking with her elder son, George, and his children. She was 67. She was buried next to Henry in the Lascelles family vault at All Saints' Church, Harewood, after a private family funeral at York Minster. A memorial service was held at Westminster Abbey. Her will was sealed in London after her death, with her estate valued at £347,626 (equivalent to £5.89 million in 2025).

Six British monarchs reigned during Mary's lifetime: Victoria (her great-grandmother), Edward VII (her grandfather), George V (her father), Edward VIII and George VI (her brothers), and Elizabeth II (her niece). She is typically remembered as an uncontroversial figure within the royal family. Mary was portrayed by Kate Phillips in Downton Abbey (2019).

During the British Mandate of Palestine, a major street in Jerusalem next to the Old City was called Princess Mary Street. After the creation of Israel, it was renamed Queen Shlomzion street.

== Titles, styles, honours and arms ==
=== Titles and styles ===
Mary was known as Princess Mary of York at birth. Mary was not styled Her Royal Highness from birth, only gaining that style in 1898 by letters patent granted by her great-grandmother, Queen Victoria. After Victoria's death in January 1901, Mary was known as Princess Mary of Cornwall and York, until her father's creation as Prince of Wales in November of that year, when she assumed the title Princess Mary of Wales.

Upon her father's accession as George V in 1910, Mary assumed the style of "Her Royal Highness The Princess Mary". (Note: As a daughter of the sovereign, Mary was entitled to use the definite article before her name. Though it was often omitted in other prints, it was used in official reports in The London Gazette.) In 1922, Mary married Henry, Viscount Lascelles and began using the title "Her Royal Highness The Princess Mary, Viscountess Lascelles". When her husband succeeded as Earl of Harewood in 1929, Mary became known as "Her Royal Highness The Princess Mary, Countess of Harewood". (Note: Mary was generally referred to officially with the definite article.) In 1932, her father granted her the title Princess Royal, which had previously belonged to her aunt Louise until her death the year before. For the rest of her life, Mary was known as "Her Royal Highness The Princess Royal".

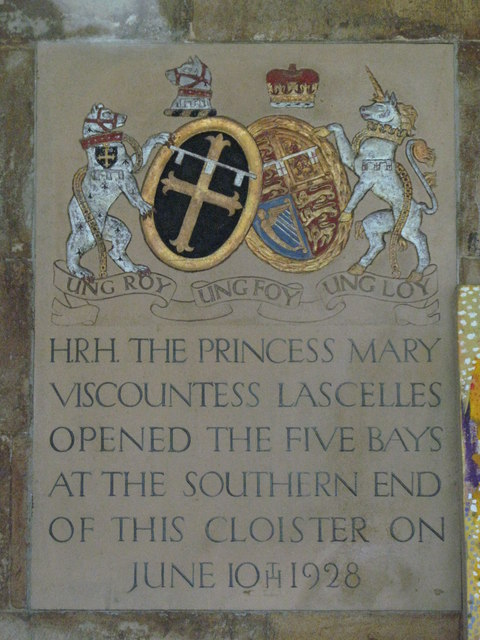
Plaque in the cloister of St Bartholomew-the-Great, London, marking the opening of five new bays by Viscountess Lascelles in 1928. It depicts the arms of the Viscount and Viscountess, along with Viscount Lascelles' motto, Ung roy, ung foy, ung loy – from his de Burgh ancestors, "one king, one faith, one law."

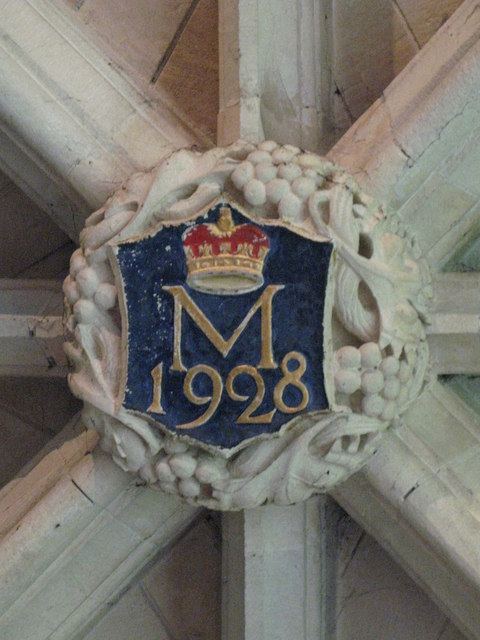
Plaque in the roof of the cloister of St Bartholomew-the-Great, London; it bears Mary's monogram and the coronet of a child of a monarch.

=== Honours ===
==== British, British Empire and Commonwealth ====
- CI: Companion of the Crown of India, 25 April 1919
- GCStJ: Dame Grand Cross of St John of Jerusalem, 12 May 1926
- GBE: Dame Grand Cross of the Order of the British Empire, 3 June 1927
- GCVO: Dame Grand Cross of the Royal Victorian Order, 11 May 1937
- RRC: Member of the Royal Red Cross
- Royal Family Order of King George V
- Royal Family Order of King George VI
- Royal Family Order of Queen Elizabeth II

==== Foreign ====
- Spain: Dame of the Order of Queen Maria Luisa, 12 July 1926

==== Freedom of the City ====
- 1952: Freeman of the City of York

==== Academic ====
- 1951–1965: Chancellor of the University of Leeds

==== Memberships ====
- 1954: Honorary Freeman of the Worshipful Company of Basketmakers

==== British ====
- 1935: Colonel-in-Chief, of the Royal Corps of Signals
- 1939: Chief Controller and later Controller Commandant, of the Auxiliary Territorial Service
- 1950: Air Chief Commandant, of Princess Mary's Royal Air Force Nursing Service

==== Military ranks ====
- 1956: General in the British Army

=== Arms ===
In 1931, Mary was awarded her own personal arms, being the royal arms, differenced by a label argent of three points, each bearing a cross gules.

Princess Mary's coat of arms

Mary's banner of arms

Mary's banner of arms in Scotland

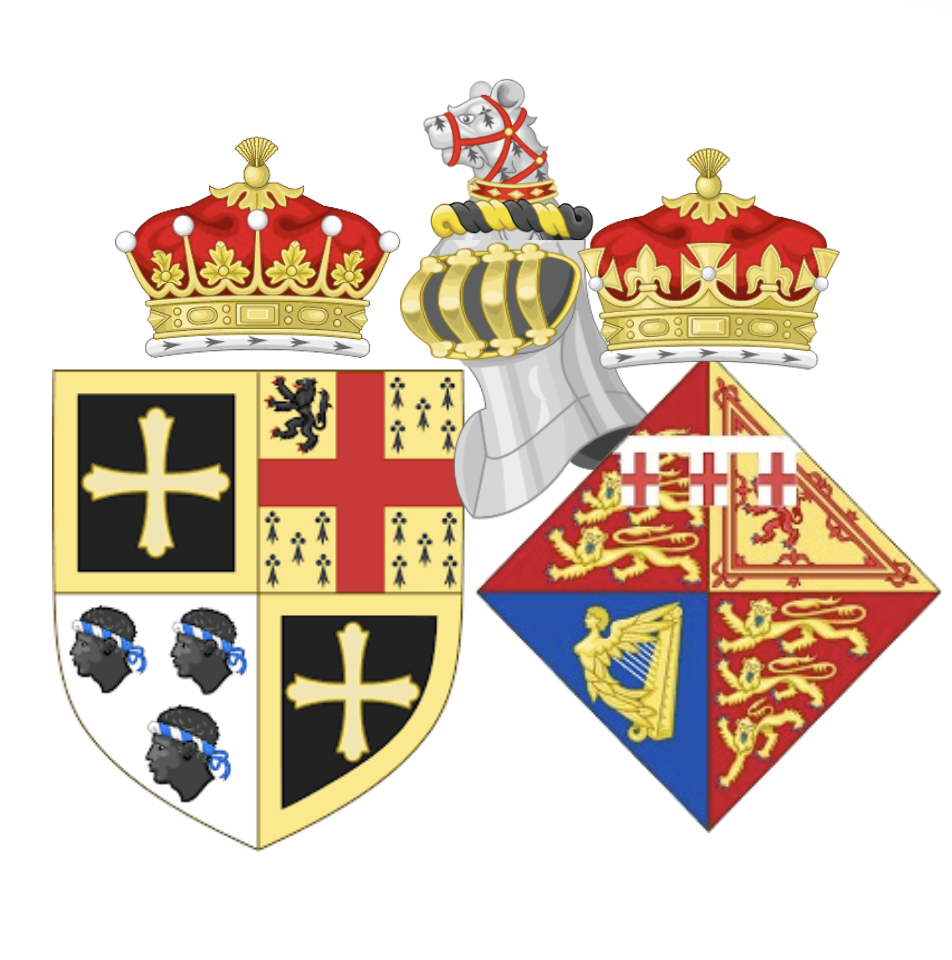

Princess Mary's arms of alliance with her husband Henry Lascelles, 6th Earl of Harewood

== Ancestry ==
Ancestors of Mary, Princess Royal and Countess of Harewood

8. Prince Albert of Saxe-Coburg and Gotha
4. Edward VII, King of the United Kingdom
9. Victoria, Queen of the United Kingdom
2. George V, King of the United Kingdom
10. Christian IX, King of Denmark
5. Princess Alexandra of Denmark
11. Princess Louise of Hesse-Kassel
1. Mary, Princess Royal and Countess of Harewood
12. Duke Alexander of Württemberg
6. Francis, Duke of Teck
13. Countess Claudine Rhédey von Kis-Rhéde
3. Princess Victoria Mary of Teck
14. Prince Adolphus, Duke of Cambridge
7. Princess Mary Adelaide of Cambridge
15. Princess Augusta of Hesse-Kassel

== Notes ==
Mary, Princess Royal and Countess of Harewood House of Windsor Cadet branch of the House of Saxe-Coburg and Gotha Born: 25 April 1897 Died: 28 March 1965
British royalty
| Vacant Title last held by Princess Louise, Duchess of Fife | Princess Royal; 1932–1965 | Vacant Title next held by Princess Anne |
Academic offices
| Preceded by The Duke of Devonshire | Chancellor of the University of Leeds; 1951–1965 | Succeeded by The Duchess of Kent |
