= York Cottage =

Coordinates: 52.8263°N 0.5162°E

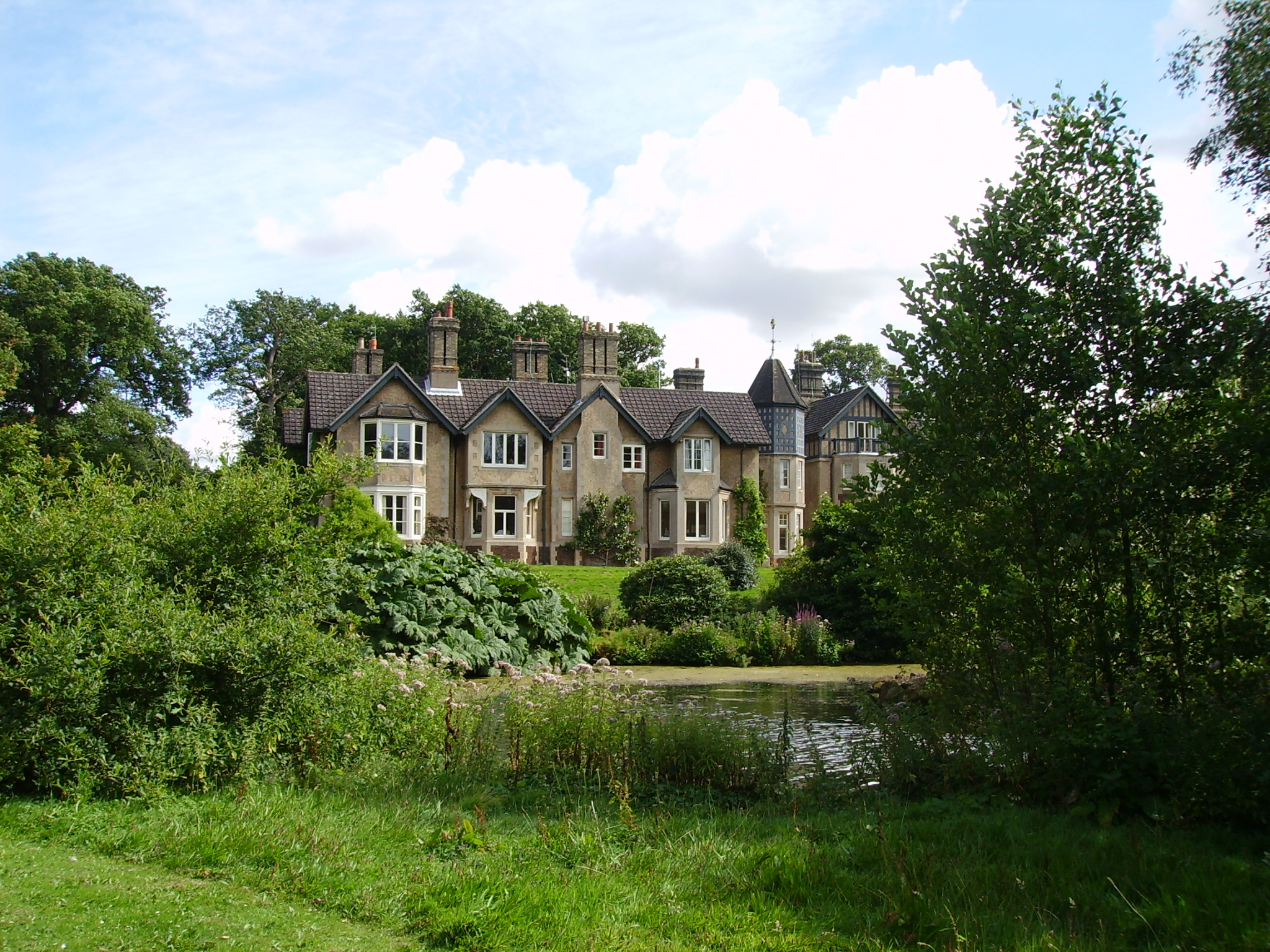
- Interactive map of the York Cottage area
- Former names: Bachelors' Cottage

General information
- Location: Sandringham Estate, Norfolk, United Kingdom
- Owner: Charles III

York Cottage is a house in the grounds of Sandringham House in Norfolk, England.

== History ==
The cottage was originally called the Bachelor's Cottage and was built as an overflow residence for Sandringham House.

In 1893, it was given by the future King Edward VII, then the Prince of Wales, as a wedding gift to his son Prince George, the Duke of York (later King George V), who lived there with his wife, the future Queen Mary, after their marriage. The couple lived there for 33 years until the death of Queen Alexandra in 1925; their five youngest children were born there.

George V loved York Cottage, which is said to resemble "three Merrie England pubs joined together." He furnished it himself with pieces purchased from Maple & Co.. "Too large and too full of footmen to be unremarkable in Surbiton or Upper Norwood, York Cottage in its own context is a monument to the eccentricity of the family who lived there," Lady Donaldson wrote of the cottage.

Today, York Cottage is the estate office for Sandringham; holiday accommodation and flats for estate employees also occupy part of the building.
