= Lascelles =

Lascelles (pronounced Lassels or 'La-sells') is an English surname of Norman-French origin whose translation means the saddle. The surname was introduced into England by followers of William the Conqueror after 1066. Notable people with the surname include:

- Alan Lascelles (1887–1981) "Tommy" Lascelles was Private Secretary to both King George VI and Queen Elizabeth II
- Alexander Lascelles, Viscount Lascelles
- Arthur Moore Lascelles (1880-1918), Captain The Durham Light Infantry VC, MC
- Daniel Lascelles (1655–1734), English landowner and politician of Stank and Northallerton, North Riding, Yorkshire
- Daniel Lascelles (1714–1784), English landowner, merchant and British politician of Goldsborough Hall
- Daniel Lascelles (1902–1967), British ambassador to Japan
- David Lascelles, 8th Earl of Harewood, British peer and film and television producer
- Edward Lascelles, 1st Earl of Harewood (1740–1820), British peer and politician
- Edwin Lascelles, 1st Baron Harewood (1713–1795), British landowner and politician, built Harewood House
- Edwin Lascelles (1799–1865), barrister and MP for Ripon from 1846 to 1857
- Ernita Lascelles (1890–1972), English actress
- Francis Lascelles (1612–1667), Member of English Parliament and New Model Army officer of Stank Hall
- Frank Lascelles (diplomat) (1841–1920), British diplomat, ambassador to Germany and to Russia
- Frank Lascelles (pageant master) (1875–1934), British pageant master
- George Lascelles, 7th Earl of Harewood, British peer
- Gerald Lascelles (disambiguation), multiple people
- Henry Lascelles (1690–1753), English merchant, landowner and politician of Harewood, Yorkshire
- Henry Lascelles, 2nd Earl of Harewood (1767–1841), British peer and politician
- Henry Lascelles, 3rd Earl of Harewood (1797–1857), British peer and politician
- Henry Lascelles, 4th Earl of Harewood (1824–1892), British peer
- Henry Lascelles, 5th Earl of Harewood (1846–1929), British peer
- Henry Lascelles, 6th Earl of Harewood (1882–1947), British peer
- Jamaal Lascelles (born 1993), English footballer
- James Lascelles (born 1953), British musician and son of the 7th Earl of Harewood
- Margaret Lascelles, Viscountess Lascelles (born 1948), the former wife of David Lascelles, Viscount Lascelles
- Mary Lascelles (literary scholar) (1900–1995), British literary scholar
- Roger de Lascelles, 13th century English nobleman
- Thomas Lascelles (British Army officer)
- Thomas Lascelles (died 1697), English Member of Parliament
- Thomas Lascelles (1624–1658), officer in the New Model Army
- Thomas Lascelles (born 1982), son of Jeremy Lascelles
- William Lascelles (1798–1851), British politician and son of Henry Lascelles, 2nd Earl of Harewood

== See also ==
- William Norman Lascelles Davidson
- Earl of Harewood
- Lascelles, Victoria, locality in Victoria, Australia
- Lascelles was an East Indiaman that sailed for the British East India Company between 1779 and 1799
- Lascelle, a locality in France
