= David Lascelles, 8th Earl of Harewood =

British hereditary peer and film and television producer (born 1950)

The Right Honourable The Earl of Harewood
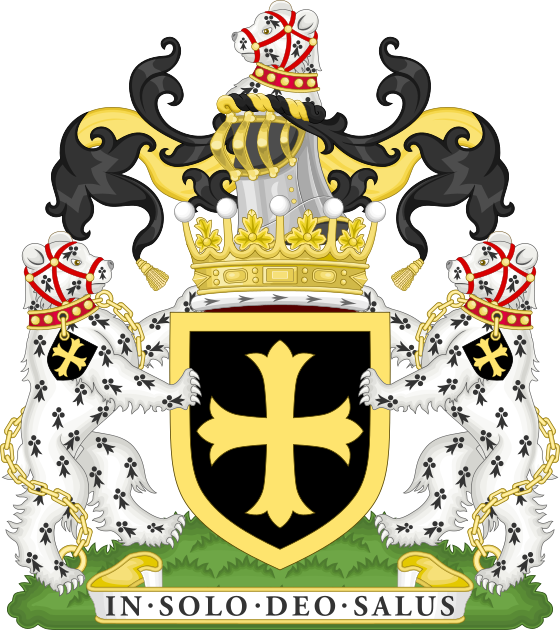
- Coat of arms
- Predecessor: George Lascelles
- Born: David Henry George Lascelles, Viscount Lascelles; 21 October 1950 (age 76); 2 Orme Square, London, England
- Spouses: Margaret Messenger (m. 1979; div. 1989); Diane Howse (m. 1990)
- Issue: Emily Shard; Benjamin Lascelles; Alexander Lascelles, Viscount Lascelles; Edward Lascelles
- Parents: George Lascelles, 7th Earl of Harewood; Marion Stein
- Occupation: Film and television producer, hereditary peer

David Henry George Lascelles, 8th Earl of Harewood (born 21 October 1950), styled as Viscount Lascelles until July 2011, is a British hereditary peer and film and television producer.

== Early life and earldom ==
David Henry George Lascelles was born at his parents' London house, 2 Orme Square, Bayswater, London, on 21 October 1950. He is the eldest son of the 7th Earl of Harewood and his first wife, Marion Stein. He was baptised at All Saints' Church, Harewood. His father was a first cousin of Queen Elizabeth II. His godparents were The Princess Elizabeth, Duchess of Edinburgh (later Queen Elizabeth II), his great-grandmother Queen Mary, his great-aunt Viscountess Boyne (Margaret Hamilton-Russell), his uncle Gerald Lascelles and Benjamin Britten. At birth, he was 13th in line to the throne. As of 2026, he is 67th in line.

He is a second cousin of King Charles III and a great-grandson of King George V.

He succeeded to the Earldom of Harewood on the death of his father in July 2011.

== Career and other activities ==
Lascelles is a film and television producer. He produced nine episodes of the 1990s TV detective series, Inspector Morse.

In 2007, as part of the commemoration of the bi-centenary of the Abolition of the Slave Trade Act, Lascelles was executive producer of the theatrical project by Geraldine Connor entitled Carnival Messiah that was staged in the grounds of Harewood House, which was built in the 18th century with funds from slave trading. Following Connor's death in 2011, Lascelles organised a concert in her memory at West Yorkshire Playhouse, and he is a founder and patron of the Geraldine Connor Foundation, established in 2012 to continue her work and vision by bringing people together through arts and culture.

As Earl of Harewood, he continues the tradition begun by his father in 1961 by serving as the honorary lifetime president of Leeds United Football Club.

In April 2023 he co-founded, with former BBC journalist Laura Trevelyan and others, Heirs of Slavery, a group of descendants of people who had profited from British transatlantic slavery and wanted to make amends in the form of reparations. Other members include Charles Gladstone, who is descended from prime minister William Gladstone, and journalist Alex Renton. The group has called on the British prime minister and King Charles III to make a formal apology on behalf of the United Kingdom.

== Awards ==
Inspector Morse won a BAFTA in 1991. It is on display in one of the bookcases at Harewood House.

== Personal life ==
On 12 February 1979, at St Mary's Church, Paddington, London, Lascelles married Margaret Rosalind Messenger, Viscountess Lascelles, daughter of Edgar Frank Messenger. The marriage was dissolved in 1989.

Their children are:

- Lady Emily Tsering Shard (born 23 November 1975). She obtained Royal Consent from the Privy Council to marry Matthew Shard on 12 February 2008. They have three children.
  - Isaac Shard, depending on the source was born in either 2008 or 2009 as the twin of Ida Shard. He is also the eldest son of Emily Shard and Matthew Shard.
  - Ida Shard, depending on the source was born in either 2008 or 2009 as the twin of Isaac Shard. She is also the eldest daughter of Emily Shard and Matthew Shard.
  - Otis Shard, depending on the source, was born in either 2010 or 2011. He is the youngest child of Emily Shard and Matthew Shard.
- The Hon. Benjamin George Lascelles (born 19 September 1978), a conservationist. Although he is Lord Harewood's eldest son, he is unable to inherit his father's titles as his parents were not married at the time of his birth. He obtained Royal Consent from the Privy Council to marry Colombian Carolina Vélez Robledo on 18 April 2009 at Harewood House.
- Alexander Edgar Lascelles, Viscount Lascelles (born 13 May 1980). He is a chef and heir-apparent to the earldom.
- The Hon. Edward David Lascelles (born 19 November 1982). He obtained Royal Consent to marry Sophie Cartlidge on 2 August 2014 in Harewood House. Edward and Sophie had a son in August 2020.

In 1990, Lascelles married artist Diane Howse, now the Countess of Harewood.

== Ancestry ==
Ancestors of David Lascelles, 8th Earl of Harewood

16. Henry Lascelles, 4th Earl of Harewood
8. Henry Lascelles, 5th Earl of Harewood
17. Lady Elizabeth de Burgh
4. Henry Lascelles, 6th Earl of Harewood
18. Orlando Bridgeman, 3rd Earl of Bradford
9. Florence Lascelles, Countess of Harewood
19. Hon. Selina Weld-Forester
2. George Lascelles, 7th Earl of Harewood
20. Edward VII
10. George V
21. Alexandra of Denmark
5. Mary, Princess Royal and Countess of Harewood
22. Francis, Duke of Teck
11. Mary of Teck
23. Princess Mary Adelaide of Cambridge
1. David Lascelles, 8th Earl of Harewood
24. Isak Stein
12. Markus Stein
25. Anna Lustig
6. Erwin Stein
13. Nanette Reik
3. Marion Stein
7. Sophie Bachmann

== Filmography ==
His work includes:

Year	Title	Role
1981	The Return of the Inca	Cinematographer
1984	Tibet: A Buddhist Trilogy	Cinematographer/Producer
1984	People Show (TV short)	Producer
1986	Mae'n Talu Withe (TV film)	Producer
1986	Zastrozzi: A Romance (TV mini-series)	Producer (4 episodes)
1988	Star Trap (TV film)	Associate Producer
1990–1991	Inspector Morse (TV series)	Producer (9 episodes)
1993	Screen One	Producer (1 episode)
1995	Richard III	Line Producer
1996	The Fortunes and Misfortunes of Moll Flanders (TV series)	Producer
1996	The Making of Moll Flanders (TV film documentary)	Himself
1998	The Wisdom of Crocodiles	Producer
1999	Second Sight (TV film)	Producer
2000	Second Sight (TV series)	Executive Producer
2002	Daddy's Girl (TV film)	Producer
2002	The John Thaw Story (TV documentary)	Himself
2013	Carved with Love: The Genius of British Woodwork (TV mini-series documentary)	Himself - Earl of Harewood

Peerage of the United Kingdom
Preceded by George Lascelles	Earl of Harewood; 11 July 2011 – present	Incumbent; Heir apparent: Viscount Lascelles
British royalty
Preceded by Zenouska Mowatt	Line of succession to the British throne descended from Mary, daughter of George V	Succeeded by Alexander Lascelles
