= Countess of Harewood =

Countess of Harewood is the title given to the wife of the Earl of Harewood. Women who have held the title are:

- Florence Lascelles, Countess of Harewood (1859-1943)
- Mary, Princess Royal and Countess of Harewood (1897-1965)
- Marion Stein (1926-2014)
- Patricia Lascelles, Countess of Harewood (1926-2018)
- Diane Howse, spouse of David Lascelles, 8th Earl of Harewood
