= Henry Lascelles =

Henry Lascelles may refer to:

- Henry Lascelles (1690–1753), English-born Barbados plantation owner, director of the British East India Company, and MP for Northallerton
- Henry Lascelles, 2nd Earl of Harewood (1767–1841), known as Viscount Lascelles from 1814 to 1820, British peer and Member of Parliament
- Henry Lascelles, 3rd Earl of Harewood (1797–1857), known as Viscount Lascelles from 1820 to 1841, British peer and Member of Parliament
- Henry Lascelles, 4th Earl of Harewood (1824–1892), British peer and son of Henry Lascelles, 3rd Earl of Harewood
- Henry Lascelles, 5th Earl of Harewood (1846–1929), British peer and son of Henry Lascelles, 4th Earl of Harewood
- Henry Lascelles, 6th Earl of Harewood (1882–1947), styled The Hon. Henry Lascelles & Viscount Lascelles, son of 5th Earl of Harewood
