= Alexander Lascelles, Viscount Lascelles =

British noble

Viscount Lascelles
- Born: Alexander Edgar Lascelles; 13 May 1980 (age 46); Bath, Somerset, England
- Occupation: Chef
- Spouse: Annika Elizabeth Reed (m. 2017)
- Children: Leo Lascelles; Ivy Lascelles; Kit Moon William Lascelles
- Parents: David Lascelles, 8th Earl of Harewood; Margaret Rosalind Messenger

Alexander Edgar Lascelles, Viscount Lascelles (born 13 May 1980) is an English chef, and the third child and second son of David Lascelles, 8th Earl of Harewood, and his first wife Margaret, Viscountess Lascelles. He is heir apparent to the earldom of Harewood, due to his elder brother having been born before their parents' marriage. He is a great-great-grandson of George V and second cousin once removed to Charles III.

A chef, Lascelles has also taught about food at the John of Gaunt School, Trowbridge.

== Personal life ==
Lascelles has a son, Leo (b. 2008)

Lascelles has a daughter, Ivy, and a son, Kit, with his wife Annika Reed (m. 2017), born in 2018 and 2023, respectively.

== Ancestry ==
The following table shows four generations.

Ancestors of Alexander Lascelles, Viscount Lascelles

8. Henry Lascelles, 6th Earl of Harewood
4. George Lascelles, 7th Earl of Harewood
9. Mary, Princess Royal
2. David Lascelles, 8th Earl of Harewood
10. Erwin Stein
5. Marion Stein
11. Sophie Bachmann
1. Alexander Lascelles, Viscount Lascelles
12. Joseph Messenger
6. Edgar Frank Messenger
13. Phoebe Barnes
3. Margaret Rosalind Messenger
7. Margaret Alice Black

== Notes ==
British royalty
Preceded by The Earl of Harewood	Line of succession to the British throne descended from Mary, daughter of George V	Succeeded by The Hon. Ivy Lascelles
