= Blue Raincoat Music =

- Parent company: Reservoir Media Management
- Founded: 2014; 12 years ago
- Founder: Jeremy Lascelles; Robin Millar
- Distributor: Reservoir Media Management
- Country of origin: United Kingdom
- Official website: https://blueraincoatmusic.com/

Established by music industry professionals Jeremy Lascelles and Robin Millar, Blue Raincoat Music began as an artist management company based in West London in 2014. In 2016, the company diversified into music publishing, starting Blue Raincoat Songs. Later that year Blue Raincoat Music bought Chrysalis Records, an agreement which saw the label returned to the independent sector and reunited with original co-founder Chris Wright, in a new non-executive chairman role. In 2017, Blue Raincoat Music acquired the Berlin-based booking agency Spar-ks. Blue Raincoat Music now serves as the umbrella company under which Blue Raincoat Artists (management), Blue Raincoat Songs (publishing), and Chrysalis Records operate.

In August 2019, Blue Raincoat was acquired by Reservoir Media Management.

== Managed artists ==
- Celebration
- Christian Lee Hutson
- Cigarettes After Sex
- J.S. Ondara
- Miss Grit
- Nova Twins
- Phoebe Bridgers

== Published artists ==
- Abisha
- AKA George
- Cabbage (band)
- Francesca Lombardo
- Jack McManus (singer)
- Jalen N'Gonda
- Malena Zavala
- Martin Craft
- Mike Chapman
- Nadia Reid
- Nerina Pallot
- Portrait
- Rickie Lee Jones
- The Wandering Hearts
- Ruarri Joseph (William The Conqueror)
