= Thomas Lascelles =

Thomas Lascelles may refer to:

- Thomas Lascelles (engineer) (1670–1751), British army officer
- Thomas Lascelles (died 1697), English Member of Parliament
- Thomas Lascelles (1624–1658), officer in the Commonwealth’s army
- Thomas Lascelles (born 1982), son of Jeremy Lascelles

== See also ==
- Tommy Lascelles (Sir Alan Frederick "Tommy" Lascelles, 1887–1981), private secretary to George VI and Elizabeth II
