= Earl of Harewood =

Earldom in the Peerage of the United Kingdom

Earldom of Harewood
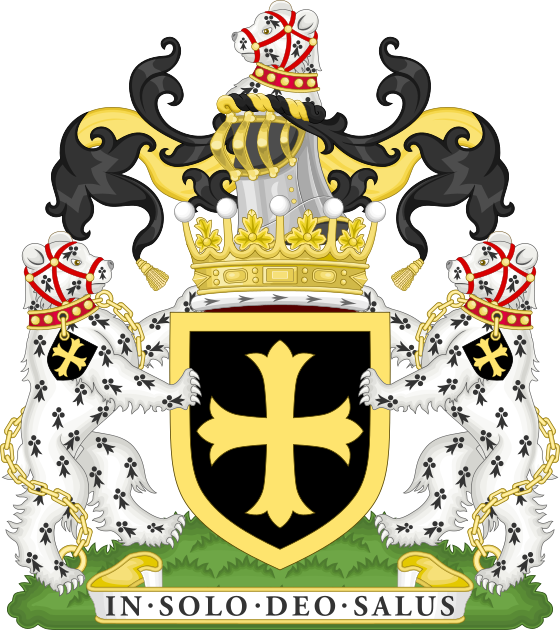
- Arms: of Lascelles: Sable, a cross patonce within a border or. Crest: On a wreath, a bear's head couped ermine, muzzled gules, buckled or, gorged with a collar of the second, studded and rimmed of the third. Supporters: Two bears ermine, each muzzled gules, gorged with a collar of the second, rimmed, studded and chain reflexed over the back or, pendant thereto an escutcheon sable, charged with a cross patonce of the third
- Creation date: 7 September 1812
- Created by: The Prince Regent (acting on behalf of his father King George III)
- Peerage: Peerage of the United Kingdom
- First holder: Edward Lascelles, 1st Earl of Harewood
- Present holder: David Lascelles, 8th Earl of Harewood
- Heir apparent: Alexander Lascelles, Viscount Lascelles
- Remainder to: the 1st Earl's heirs male of the body lawfully begotten
- Subsidiary titles: Viscount Lascelles; Baron Harewood
- Status: Extant
- Seat: Harewood House
- Former seat: Goldsborough Hall
- Motto: In Solo Deo Salus (In God alone is our salvation)

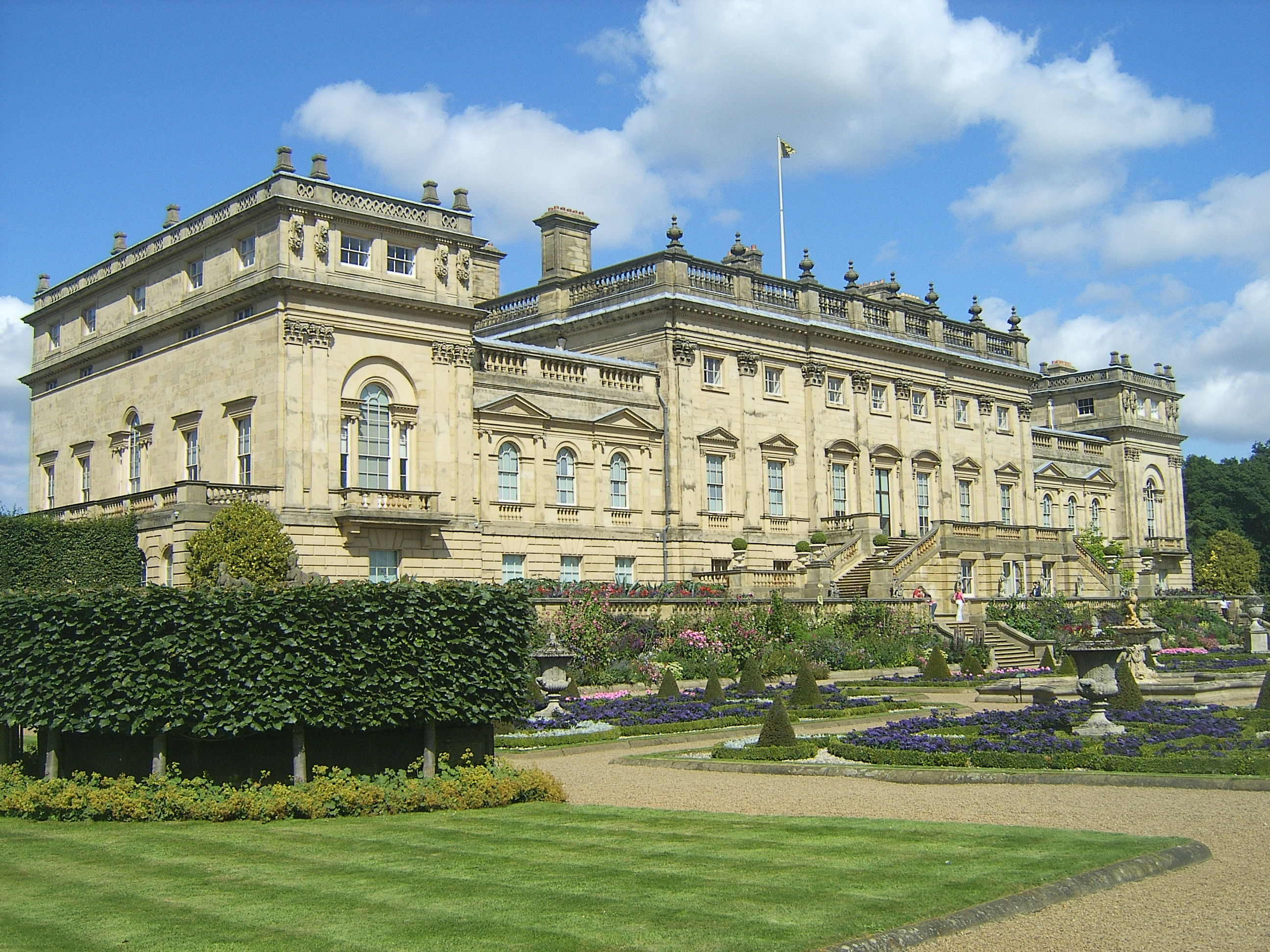
Harewood House, seat of the Earls of Harewood

Earl of Harewood (/ˈhɑːrwʊd/), in the County of York, is a title in the Peerage of the United Kingdom.

== History ==
The title was created in 1812 for Edward Lascelles, 1st Baron Harewood, a wealthy sugar plantation owner and former Member of Parliament for Northallerton. He had already been created Baron Harewood, of Harewood in the County of York, in 1796, in the Peerage of Great Britain, and was made Viscount Lascelles at the same time as he was given the earldom. The viscountcy is used as the courtesy title by the heir apparent to the earldom. Lascelles was the second cousin, and heir at law, of Edwin Lascelles, who already in 1790 had been created Baron Harewood, of Harewood Castle in the County of York (in the Peerage of Great Britain). However, this title became extinct on his death in 1795.

The Earl was succeeded by his son, the second Earl. He represented Yorkshire, Westbury and Northallerton in the House of Commons. When slavery was abolished in the West Indies, he claimed payment under the Slave Compensation Act 1837 for the emancipation of some 1,277 people on his plantations in Barbados and Jamaica; he received a payment of £26,307 (worth £2.71 million in 2025). The freed slaves received no compensation.

His son, the third Earl, also sat as Member of Parliament for Northallerton. His great-grandson, the sixth Earl, married Princess Mary, daughter of King George V. He was succeeded by their eldest son, the seventh Earl, in 1947. He was a first cousin of Queen Elizabeth II and was born sixth in line of succession to the British Throne. The titles are currently held by the latter's son, the eighth Earl, who succeeded in 2011.

Several other members of the family have also gained distinction. Francis Lascelles was a Commissioner in the High Court of Justice for the trial of King Charles I although did not sign the death warrant, whilst Francis' brother was Thomas Lascelles, who served in the Parliamentarian Army. Daniel Lascelles, son of the aforementioned Francis Lascelles, was member of parliament for Northallerton. Henry Lascelles, second son of the aforementioned Daniel Lascelles, was Member of Parliament for Northallerton and a Director of the Honourable East India Company. He was the father of 1) the first Baron of the 1790 creation, and 2) Daniel Lascelles, represented Northallerton in Parliament. The Honourable William Lascelles, third son of the second Earl, was a Whig politician. His third son Sir Frank Lascelles, was British Ambassador to Russia and to Germany. Sir Francis William Lascelles, son of Henry Arthur Lascelles, fourth son of the aforementioned William Lascelles, was Clerk of the Parliaments between 1953 and 1958. Edwin Lascelles, fourth son of the second Earl, sat as member of parliament for Ripon. Sir Alan Lascelles, son of the Honourable Frederick Canning Lascelles, second son of the fourth Earl, was Private Secretary to both George VI and Elizabeth II. Sir Daniel Lascelles, son of the Honourable William Horace Lascelles, eighth son of the fourth Earl, was a diplomat.

The family seat is Harewood House, near Leeds, Yorkshire. The name of the house, like the title of the barony and earldom, is pronounced: "Harwood". The family name is pronounced to rhyme with "tassels". The traditional burial place of the Lascelles Earls of Harewood is All Saints' Church, Harewood.

== Barons Harewood, first creation (1790) ==
- Edwin Lascelles, 1st Baron Harewood (1713–1795)

== Barons Harewood, second creation (1796) ==
- Edward Lascelles, 1st Baron Harewood (1740–1820) (created Earl of Harewood in 1812)

== Earls of Harewood (1812) ==
- Edward Lascelles, 1st Earl of Harewood (1740–1820)
  - Hon. Edward Lascelles, Viscount Lascelles (1764–1814)
- Henry Lascelles, 2nd Earl of Harewood (1767–1841)
  - Hon. Edward Lascelles, Viscount Lascelles (1796–1839)
- Henry Lascelles, 3rd Earl of Harewood (1797–1857)
- Henry Thynne Lascelles, 4th Earl of Harewood (1824–1892)
- Henry Ulick Lascelles, 5th Earl of Harewood (1846–1929)
- Henry George Charles Lascelles, 6th Earl of Harewood (1882–1947), husband of Mary, Princess Royal
- George Henry Hubert Lascelles, 7th Earl of Harewood (1923–2011), opera manager and writer
- David Henry George Lascelles, 8th Earl of Harewood (b. 1950)

The heir apparent is the present holder's second-born (but eldest legitimate) son Alexander Edgar Lascelles, Viscount Lascelles (b. 1980).

== Line of succession ==
- Edward Lascelles, 1st Earl of Harewood (1740–1820)
  - Henry Lascelles, 2nd Earl of Harewood (1767–1841)
    - Henry Lascelles, 3rd Earl of Harewood (1797–1857)
      - Henry Lascelles, 4th Earl of Harewood (1824–1892)
        - Henry Lascelles, 5th Earl of Harewood (1846–1929)
          - Henry Lascelles, 6th Earl of Harewood (1882–1947)
            - George Lascelles, 7th Earl of Harewood (1923–2011)
              - David Lascelles, 8th Earl of Harewood (born 1950)
                - (1) Alexander Lascelles, Viscount Lascelles (b. 1980)
                  - (2) Hon. Kit Moon William Lascelles (b. 2023)
                - (3) Hon. Edward Lascelles (b. 1982)
                  - (4) Sebastian Lascelles (b. 2020)
              - (5) Hon. James Lascelles (b. 1953)
                - (6) Rowan Lascelles (b. 1977)
                - (7) Tewa Lascelles (b. 1985)
                  - (8) Fran Lascelles (b. 2014)
              - (9) Hon. Jeremy Lascelles (b. 1955)
                - (10) Thomas Lascelles (b. 1982)
            - Hon. Gerald Lascelles (1924–1998)
              - (11) Henry Lascelles (b. 1953)
                - (12) Maximilian Lascelles (b. 1991)
