= Angela Lascelles =

British actress

- Born: Angela Estree Lyssod D'Arcy Dowding; 20 April 1919; Hanwell, London, England
- Died: 28 February 2007 (aged 87); Virginia Water, Surrey, England
- Education: Central School of Speech and Drama
- Occupation: Actress
- Spouse: The Hon. Gerald Lascelles (m. 1952; div. 1978)
- Children: 1
- Parents: Charles Stanley Dowding; Lilian Emma, Lady Fox (née Lawler)

Angela Estree Lyssod D'Arcy Lascelles (née Dowding; 20 April 1919 – 28 February 2007) was a British actress who married into the British royal family. She was the first wife of The Honourable Gerald Lascelles, second son of the 6th Earl of Harewood and his wife Mary, Princess Royal, the only daughter of King George V and Queen Mary.

== Birth and career ==
She was born on 20 April 1919 in Hanwell, London. She studied at the Central School of Speech and Drama before starring in Noël Coward's Blithe Spirit in the West End, and the film Miss London Ltd.

== Marriage and issue ==
On 15 July 1952, she married Gerald David Lascelles, the second son of Mary, Princess Royal and Countess of Harewood. They had met at a party hosted by the Earl of Kimberley. He was a grandson of King George V and a cousin of Elizabeth II. At the time of their marriage, he was twelfth in the line of succession to the British throne. As the son of an earl, he was styled The Honourable, and her style (formerly Miss Angela Dowding) became The Honourable Mrs Gerald Lascelles.

The marriage took place at St. Margaret's, Westminster, with members of the British royal family in attendance. However, the Queen did not attend due to a last-minute cold. This was seen in the press to be a snub for the couple. The reception took place at St James's Palace and was attended by Queen Mary, the groom's maternal grandmother.

The couple had one child, Henry Ulick Lascelles (born 19 May 1953 in London), who married twice and has one son. In 1955, the family moved to Fort Belvedere, Surrey, the former country home of Gerald Lascelles's uncle, Edward VIII (the Duke of Windsor).

== Divorce and later life ==
The couple divorced in 1978, and he later married actress Elizabeth Colvin (née Collingwood). Angela Lascelles continued to live in Windsor Great Park, and she maintained good relations with the royal family. The Queen continued to invite her to the Royal Enclosure at Ascot. She never remarried and died in Virginia Water, Surrey, on 28 February 2007.
