= Gerald Lascelles =

Gerald Lascelles is the name of:

- Gerald William Lascelles (1849–1928), author and Deputy Surveyor of the New Forest, England
  - Gerald Hubert Lascelles (1876–1928), son of Gerald William Lascelles
- Gerald David Lascelles (1924–1998), younger son of 6th Earl of Harewood and Princess Mary, Princess Royal, President of the British Racing Drivers' Club from 1964 to 1991
