= Chrysalis Records =

British record label

Chrysalis Records Ltd
- Founded: 1968; 58 years ago
- Founder: Chris Wright; Terry Ellis
- Status: Europe: Independent record company, owned by Reservoir Media Management; Rest of the world: defunct, merged into Universal Music Group
- Distributors: U.S. and Canadian catalogues, as well as those of Ramones, Robbie Williams, Billy Idol and Belinda Carlisle: Universal Music Group: Capitol Records; Geffen Records (Ramones; US and Canada only); Island Records (Robbie Williams); Virgin Records (Belinda Carlisle); Most non-North American catalogues, plus the rights to artists not originally signed to Chrysalis: Blue Raincoat Music/Reservoir Media Management: Reservoir Media Management; Catalogues of Spandau Ballet, Jethro Tull, Ramones and the Proclaimers: Warner Music Group: Parlophone (Europe); Rhino Entertainment (Rest of the world, except Ramones)
- Genre: Various
- Country of origin: United Kingdom
- Official website: blueraincoatmusic.com/chrysalisrecords

Chrysalis Records (/ˈkrɪsəlɪs/) is a British independent record label that was founded in 1968. The name is both a reference to the pupal stage of a butterfly and a combination of its founders' names, Chris Wright and Terry Ellis. It started as the Ellis-Wright Agency.

== History ==
=== Early years ===
Chrysalis entered into a licensing deal with Chris Blackwell's Island Records for distribution, based on the success of bands such as Jethro Tull, Ten Years After, and Procol Harum, which were promoted by the label. Jethro Tull signed with Reprise Records in the United States, which led Chrysalis to an American distribution deal with Reprise's parent company, Warner Bros. Records. This lasted from 1972 until U.S. Chrysalis switched to independent distribution in 1976. PolyGram handled international distribution and Festival Records covered Australia and New Zealand. In 1973, it signed British rock band UFO and in 1975, Rory Gallagher. Towards the end of the 1970s, the label began to extend its range of music, incorporating acts from the punk rock scene such as Generation X and Stiff Little Fingers beginning with their second album. The Chrysalis offshoot 2 Tone Records brought in bands such as the Specials and the Selecter.

In 1979 Chrysalis bought and distributed U.S. folk label Takoma Records, naming manager/producer Denny Bruce as president, who signed the Fabulous Thunderbirds and T-Bone Burnett. Jon Monday, who was vice president of Takoma Records prior to the acquisition, continued as general manager, later becoming director of marketing for Chrysalis Records.

In the 1980s, Chrysalis was at the forefront of the British new romantic movement with bands such as Gen X, Ultravox, and Spandau Ballet. The 1980s proved to be the most successful time for the label, whose roster then included Billy Idol, Pat Benatar, Blondie, and Huey Lewis and the News. Chrysalis also distributed Animal Records, the short-lived label founded by Blondie guitarist Chris Stein. In 1983, after the label re-established itself in New York, Eric Heckman, formerly of Atlantic and Epic Records promotion, took over as senior director of promotion and marketing. Also in 1983, Daniel Glass moved to Chrysalis as director of new music marketing, advancing later to senior vice president. During the next two years, Chrysalis broke Huey Lewis and the News, Billy Idol, and Spandau Ballet in the United States, whilst Pat Benatar continued to find success on both the traditional and dance music charts.

In 1984, Chrysalis bought Ensign Records, a record label Nigel Grainge started in 1976 (with the label's name coming from the idea that 'N. signs' as in 'Nigel Signs'). Ensign Records would go on to have The Waterboys, World Party, and Sinéad O'Connor on its roster in the late 1980s. Ensign joined TV marketing/compilations company Dover Records and dance label Cooltempo as part of the Chrysalis family, with Grainge staying on to run the label that he founded.

=== EMI ===
In 1989, 50% of the Chrysalis Records label was sold, then the remaining half in 1991 to Thorn EMI, with the Chrysalis Group (primarily a music publisher with other interests in radio and television production) setting up new indie labels such as Echo and Papillon in the mid-1990s. Chrysalis Records was folded into EMI subsidiary and flagship label EMI Records in 2005, with catalogue and artists such as Starsailor being shifted to EMI's main imprints. In 2010, BMG Rights Management bought Chrysalis Music's assets (the publishing division and The Echo Label).

In September 2012, after acquiring EMI's record labels, Universal Music Group offered to divest several record labels, including EMI's Chrysalis and Parlophone, to meet the European Commission's demands. The deal did not include Chrysalis' North American catalogue (which was folded into Capitol Records in 2007) or Robbie Williams (who was transferred to Island Records).

In February 2013, Warner Music Group announced that it would acquire many of EMI's European record labels, including Chrysalis and Parlophone, for £487 million. In July 2013, WMG completed its purchase of the Parlophone Label Group.

=== Later ownership ===
After announcing its acquisition of Parlophone, Warner Music "continue[d] to divest itself of more of its independent labels." Chrysalis Records was bought in May 2016 from WMG in a deal led by Blue Raincoat Music's Jeremy Lascelles and Robin Millar. The agreement had the co-founder and original owner of Chrysalis, Chris Wright, reunited with the label as non-executive chairman, 27 years after selling the company to EMI. Former Virgin Media boss Robert Devereux was also part of the original consortium.

In 2018, the Cooltempo label was relaunched by Blue Raincoat Music with the release of the Eye Ring EP by Francesca Lombardo and Infinity Ink's debut album House of Infinity. In August 2019, music rights company, Reservoir, partnered with Blue Raincoat, to make the Chrysalis record label part of Reservoir's extended global infrastructure and network.

=== 2020s ===
Chrysalis Records relaunched itself as a front-line label in February 2020, marking a return to releasing new music for the first time in over two decades. The first signing was in partnership with award-winning independent label Partisan Records. The labels came together to sign British singer/songwriter Laura Marling in a fully co-branded global release. As the first project released on Chrysalis' relaunched frontline label, Marling's album, Song for Our Daughter, debuted in April 2020 to critical acclaim and a Mercury Prize nomination.

In September 2020, Chrysalis signed the indie singer-songwriter Liz Phair. Phair's first album in a decade, Soberish, came out later in 2021.

On 6 August 2021, the second album from Laura Marling and Mike Lindsay's project Lump (styled in all caps), titled Animal charted at number 65 on the UK Albums Chart, and was one of the Top 20 selling albums for that week (6–12 August 2021). Chrysalis also reissued the first six albums by De La Soul on physical, digital and streaming platforms in early 2023; those albums were originally released by Tommy Boy, which, like Chrysalis, is also owned by Reservoir Media.

In July 2023, The Endless Coloured Ways was released under the Chrysalis Records label. It is a collection of songs by singer/songwriter Nick Drake, performed and recorded by 30 artists, including Fontaines D.C., Guy Garvey, Aurora, Feist, Self Esteem, and David Gray.

== See also ==
- The Echo Label (a Chrysalis Group indie label)
- Papillon Records (a Chrysalis Group record label)
- Lists of record labels
