= Personal aide-de-camp =

Honorary role in the United Kingdom

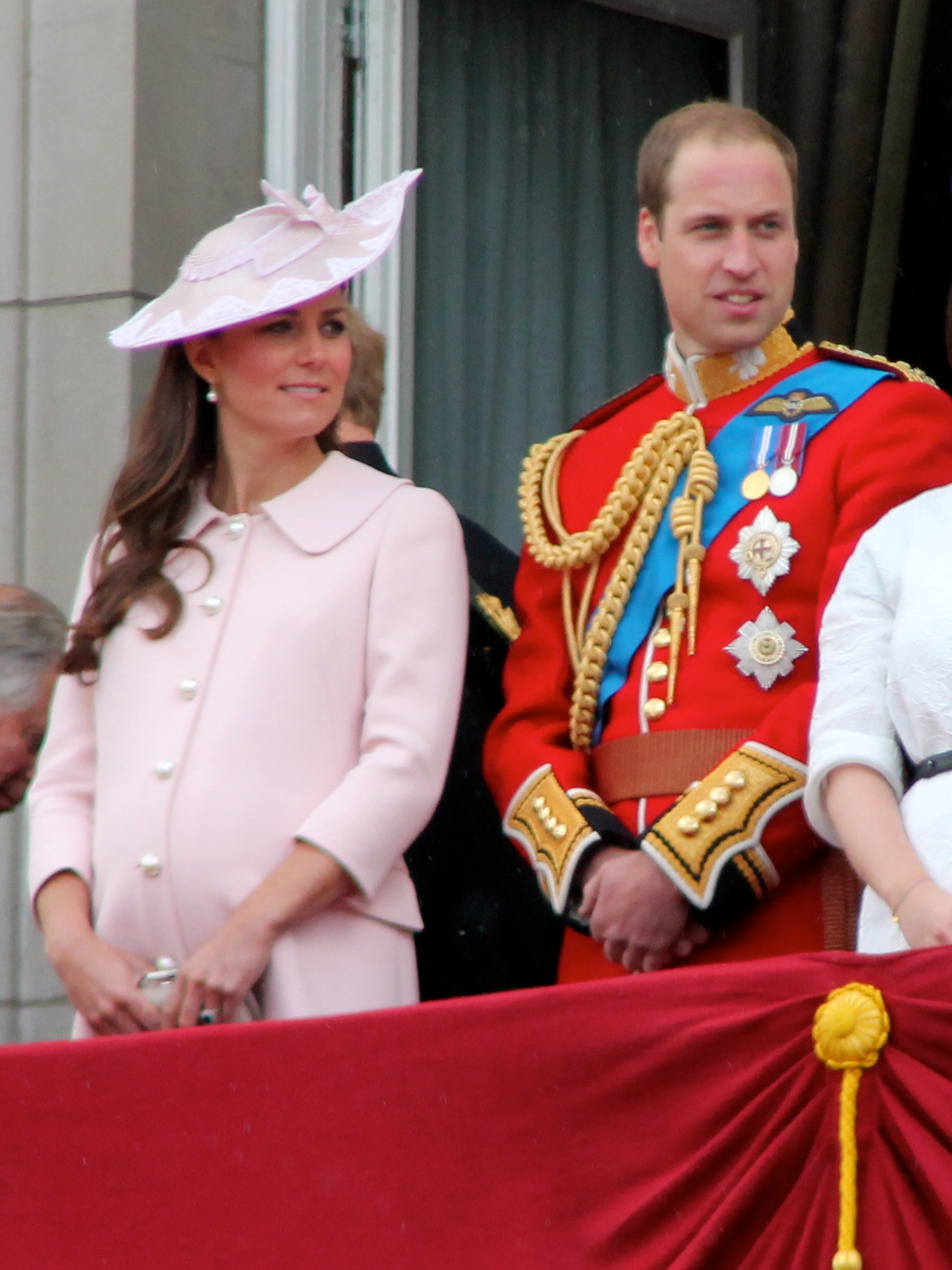
Prince William in the gold cord (aiguillette) of the queen's personal aide-de-camp, 2013

Personal Aide-de-Camp to the King (or Queen) is an appointment in the Royal Household of the United Kingdom. Unlike other aides-de-camp, it is held only by members of the British royal family with military rank. The appointment may be signified by the post-nominal letters 'ADC(P)'. It is an honorary role with few duties or responsibilities attached.

== History ==
The practice of appointing family members as Personal Aides-de-Camp was begun in the 1870s by Queen Victoria. In 1895 she wrote to her cousin Prince George, Duke of Cambridge (who was approaching the end of his tenure as Commander-in-Chief of the Forces) to inform him of her intention to appoint him as her first personal Aide-de-Camp, 'with the right of attending me on all military occasions and of holding the Parade on my birthday'.

In 1937 and 1953, the Personal Aides-de-Camp were specifically listed as riding close behind the Gold State Coach in the Coronation procession.

There are other categories of aides-de-camp to the Sovereign; most are serving military, naval, and air officers, usually of colonel or brigadier rank or equivalent. There are also specific posts for very senior officers, such as First and Principal Naval Aide-de-Camp, Flag Aide-de-Camp, Aide-de-Camp General, and Air Aide-de-Camp.

== Insignia ==
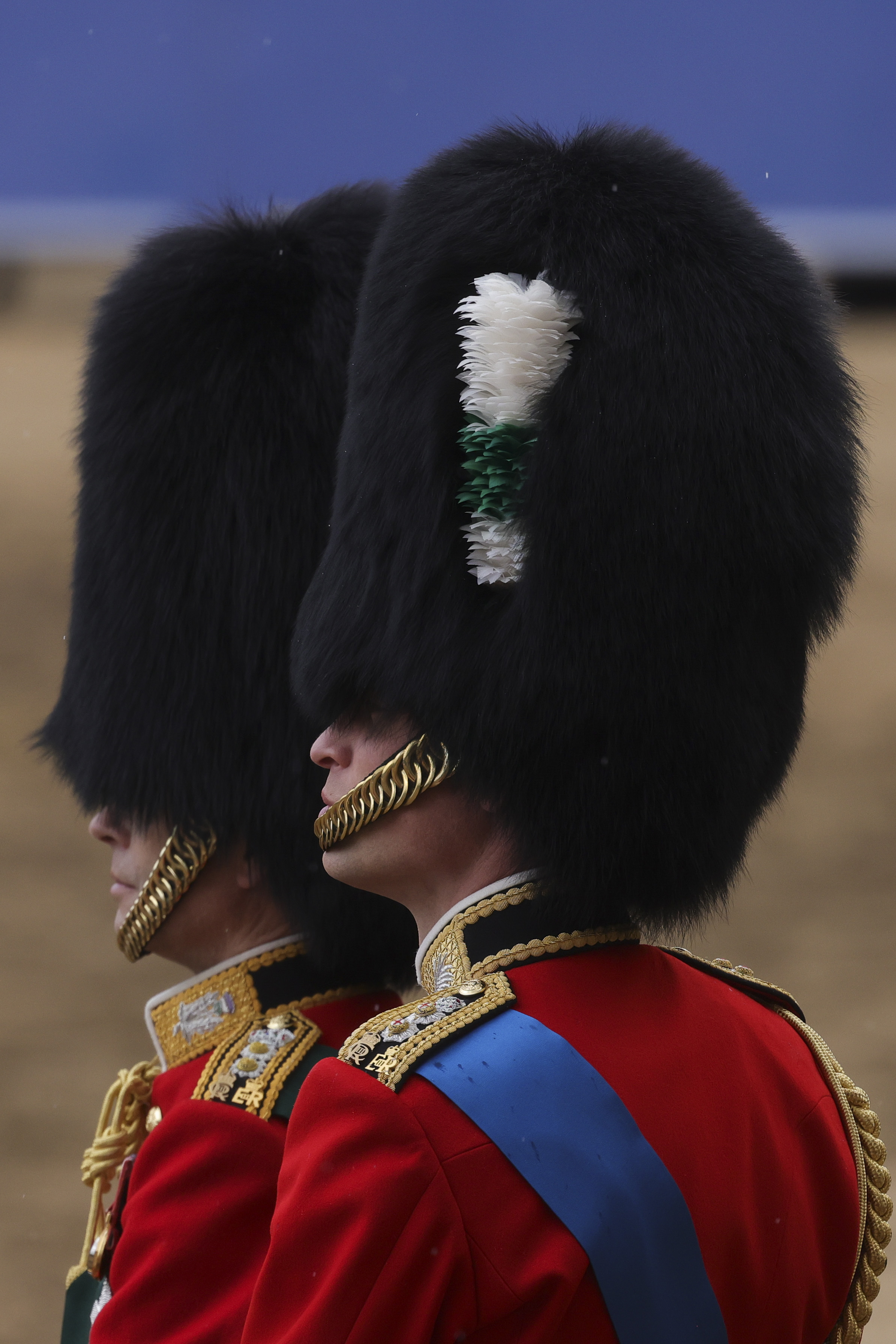
The Duke of Edinburgh (left) and Prince of Wales wear two royal cyphers on each shoulder, having been Personal Aides-de-Camp to two monarchs (Charles III and Elizabeth II).

The emblems of the office are the royal cypher and crown (of the monarch who appointed the officer), which is worn on the uniform shoulder straps; and (when wearing certain classes of uniform) No. 1 gold aiguillettes, which are worn on the right shoulder.

The aiguillettes of Personal Aides-de-Camp are distinguished from those of other Aides-de-Camp by the addition of the royal cypher and crown to each tag. In the 20th century, the royal cyphers worn by Personal Aides-de-Camp differed from those worn by other officers in that they consisted of block letters, rather than being of the usual stylised format.

Personal Aides-de-Camp continue to wear the royal cypher on their shoulder straps even after relinquishing the appointment, and if the appointment was held under more than one sovereign then the cypher of each is worn.

== List of Personal Aides-de-Camp to the Sovereign by reign ==
Ranks shown are as at the time of first appointment.

=== Victoria ===
Rank (or appointment)	Name and date of appointment	Military branch Years served
Field Marshal	Albert Edward, Prince of Wales (1876 – 22 January 1901)	British Army
Field Marshal	Prince Arthur, Duke of Connaught and Strathearn (26 May 1876 – 22 January 1901)	British Army; 1868–1942
Admiral of the Fleet	Prince Alfred, Duke of Edinburgh (later Duke of Saxe-Coburg and Gotha) (26 May 1876 – 30 July 1900) (Personal Naval Aide-de-Camp)	(United Kingdom) Royal Navy; August 1858–30 July 1900
Field Marshal	Prince George, Duke of Cambridge (November 1882 – 22 January 1901) (was appointed Chief Personal Aide-de-Camp on 1 November 1895)	British Army; 3 November 1837 – 17 March 1904
Captain	Prince Albert Victor of Wales (later Duke of Clarence and Avondale) (21 June 1887 – 14 January 1892)	(United Kingdom) Royal Navy
Captain	Prince Albert Victor of Wales (later Duke of Clarence and Avondale) (21 June 1887 – 14 January 1892)	British Army; 1877–1892
Lieutenant	Prince George of Wales (later Duke of York) (21 June 1887 – 22 January 1901) (Personal Naval Aide-de-Camp)	(United Kingdom) Royal Navy
Captain	Prince Louis of Battenberg (later Marquess of Milford Haven) (1 January 1897 – 22 January 1901) (Honorary Naval Aide-de-Camp)	(United Kingdom) Royal Navy; 1868–1914
General	Prince Christian of Schleswig-Holstein (22 June 1897 – 22 January 1901)	British Army; July 1866–28 October 1917

=== Edward VII ===
Rank (or appointment)	Name and date of appointment	Military branch Years served
Rear-Admiral	Prince George, Duke of Cornwall and York (later Prince of Wales) (25 February 1901 – 6 May 1910) (Personal Naval Aide-de-Camp)	(United Kingdom) Royal Navy
Captain	Prince Louis of Battenberg (25 February 1901 – 6 May 1910) (Personal Naval Aide-de-Camp)	(United Kingdom) Royal Navy; 1868–1914
Field Marshal	Prince George, Duke of Cambridge (1901 – 17 March 1904) (Chief Personal Aide-de-Camp)	British Army; 3 November 1837 – 17 March 1904
General	Prince Arthur, Duke of Connaught and Strathearn (1901 – 6 May 1910)	British Army; 1868–1942
General	Prince Christian of Schleswig-Holstein (1901 – 6 May 1910)	British Army; July 1866–28 October 1917
Lieutenant	Prince Arthur of Connaught (30 June 1905 – 6 May 1910)	British Army; 1901–1922

=== George V ===
Rank (or appointment)	Name and date of appointment	Military branch Years served
Vice-Admiral	Prince Louis of Battenberg (later Marquess of Milford Haven) (3 June 1910 – 11 September 1921) (Personal Naval Aide-de-Camp)	(United Kingdom) Royal Navy; 1868–1914
Field Marshal	Prince Arthur, Duke of Connaught and Strathearn (3 June 1910 – 20 January 1936)	British Army; 1868–1942
Captain	Prince Arthur of Connaught (3 June 1910 – 20 January 1936)	British Army; 1901–1922
General	Prince Christian of Schleswig-Holstein (3 June 1910 – 28 October 1917)	British Army; July 1866–28 October 1917
Major	Adolphus, Duke of Teck (later Marquess of Cambridge) (3 June 1910 – 24 October 1927)	British Army; 1888–1919
Brevet Lieutenant-Colonel	Alexander Cambridge, 1st Earl of Athlone (1 January 1919 – 20 January 1936)	British Army; 1894–1931
Colonel	Edward, Prince of Wales (3 June 1919 – 20 January 1936)	(United Kingdom) Royal Navy; 1910
Colonel	Edward, Prince of Wales (3 June 1919 – 20 January 1936)	British Army; 1914–1919
Group Captain	Prince Albert (later Duke of York) (3 June 1919 – 20 January 1936)	(United Kingdom) Royal Navy; 1913–1918; Royal Air Force; 1918–1919
Captain	Prince Henry, Duke of Gloucester (2 August 1929 – 20 January 1936)	British Army; 1919–1937
Lieutenant	Prince George (later Duke of Kent) (19 July 1932 – 20 January 1936) (Personal Naval Aide-de-Camp)	(United Kingdom) Royal Navy; 1916–1929

=== Edward VIII ===
Rank (or appointment)	Name and date of appointment	Military branch Years served
Field Marshal	Prince Arthur, Duke of Connaught and Strathearn (1 May 1936 – 11 December 1936)	British Army; 1868–1942
Admiral	Prince Albert, Duke of York (23 June 1936 – 11 December 1936) (also Personal Naval Aide-de-Camp)	(United Kingdom) Royal Navy; 1913–1918
General	Prince Albert, Duke of York (23 June 1936 – 11 December 1936) (also Personal Naval Aide-de-Camp)	(United Kingdom) Royal Navy; 1913–1918
General	Prince Albert, Duke of York (23 June 1936 – 11 December 1936) (also Personal Naval Aide-de-Camp)	Royal Air Force; 1918–1919
Air Chief Marshal	Prince Albert, Duke of York (23 June 1936 – 11 December 1936) (also Personal Naval Aide-de-Camp)	Royal Air Force; 1918–1919
Commander (Colonel-in-Chief)	Prince George, Duke of Kent (23 June 1936 – 11 December 1936) (also Personal Naval Aide-de-Camp)	(United Kingdom) Royal Navy; 1916–1929
Commander	Lord Louis Mountbatten (23 June 1936 – 11 December 1936) (Personal Naval Aide-de-Camp)	(United Kingdom) Royal Navy; 1916–1965
Major	Prince Henry, Duke of Gloucester (23 June 1936 – 11 December 1936)	British Army; 1919–1937
Hon. Major General	Prince Arthur of Connaught (23 June 1936 – 11 December 1936)	British Army; 1901–1922
Hon. Major General	Alexander Cambridge, 1st Earl of Athlone (23 June 1936 – 11 December 1936)	British Army; 1894–1931
(Honorary Colonel)	Henry Lascelles, 6th Earl of Harewood (23 June 1936 – 11 December 1936)	British Army; 12 February 1902 – 24 May 1947

=== George VI ===
Rank (or appointment)	Name and date of appointment	Military branch Years served
Captain (Colonel-in-Chief)	Prince George, Duke of Kent (1 February 1937 – 25 August 1942) (also Personal Naval Aide-de-Camp)	(United Kingdom) Royal Navy; 1916–1929
Commander	Lord Louis Mountbatten (later Viscount Mountbatten of Burma and Earl Mountbatten of Burma) (1 February 1937 – 6 February 1952) (Personal Naval Aide-de-Camp)	(United Kingdom) Royal Navy; 1916–1965
Major-General; Air Vice-Marshal	Prince Henry, Duke of Gloucester (1 February 1937 – 6 February 1952)	British Army; 1919–1937
Field Marshal	Prince Arthur, Duke of Connaught and Strathearn (1 February 1937 – 16 January 1942)	British Army
Hon. Major General	Prince Arthur of Connaught (1 February 1937 – 12 September 1938)	British Army; 1901–1922
Hon. Major General	Alexander Cambridge, 1st Earl of Athlone (1 February 1937 – 6 February 1952)	British Army; 1894–1931
(Honorary Colonel)	Henry Lascelles, 6th Earl of Harewood (1 February 1937 – 24 May 1947)	British Army; 12 February 1902 – 24 May 1947
Lieutenant	Philip, Duke of Edinburgh (10 June 1948 – 6 February 1952)	(United Kingdom) Royal Navy; 1939–1952

=== Elizabeth II ===
Rank (or appointment)	Name and date of appointment	Military branch Years served
General	Prince Henry, Duke of Gloucester (10 March 1953 – 10 June 1974)	British Army; 1919–1937
Hon. Major General	Alexander Cambridge, 1st Earl of Athlone (10 March 1953 – 16 January 1957)	British Army; 1894–1931
Admiral	Louis Mountbatten, 1st Earl Mountbatten of Burma (10 March 1953 – 27 August 1979)	(United Kingdom) Royal Navy; 1916–1965
Captain	Prince Edward, Duke of Kent (1 August 1966 – 8 September 2022)	British Army; 1955–1976
Lieutenant	Charles, Prince of Wales (6 December 1973 – 8 September 2022)	(United Kingdom) Royal Navy; 1971–1976
Lieutenant	Charles, Prince of Wales (6 December 1973 – 8 September 2022)	Royal Air Force; 1971
Captain	Mark Phillips (1 January 1974 – 1992)	British Army; 1969–1978
Lieutenant	Prince Andrew (later Duke of York) (1 February 1984 – 13 January 2022)	(United Kingdom) Royal Navy; 1978–2001
(Royal Honorary Colonel)	Prince Edward, Earl of Wessex (1 August 2004 – 8 September 2022)	Royal Marines; 1986-1987
Rear Admiral	Timothy Laurence (1 August 2004 – 8 September 2022)	(United Kingdom) Royal Navy; 1973–2011
Lieutenant	Prince William, Duke of Cambridge (17 March 2013 – 8 September 2022)	(United Kingdom) Royal Navy; 2008
Captain	Prince William, Duke of Cambridge (17 March 2013 – 8 September 2022)	British Army; 2006–2009
Flight Lieutenant	Prince William, Duke of Cambridge (17 March 2013 – 8 September 2022)	Royal Air Force; 2008–2013
Lieutenant Commander; Major	Prince Harry, Duke of Sussex (13 October 2018 – 19 February 2021)	British Army; 2005–2015
Squadron Leader	Prince Harry, Duke of Sussex (13 October 2018 – 19 February 2021)	British Army; 2005–2015

=== Charles III ===
Rank (or appointment)	Name and date of appointment	Military branch Years served
Commander	William, Prince of Wales (2023–present)	(United Kingdom) Royal Navy; 2008
Lieutenant Colonel	William, Prince of Wales (2023–present)	British Army; 2006–2009
Wing Commander	William, Prince of Wales (2023–present)	Royal Air Force; 2008–2013
(Royal Honorary Colonel)	Prince Edward, Duke of Edinburgh (2023–present)	Royal Marines; 1986–1987
(Honorary Air Commodore)	Prince Edward, Duke of Edinburgh (2023–present)	Royal Marines; 1986–1987
Admiral	Anne, Princess Royal (2023–present)	
General	Anne, Princess Royal (2023–present)	
Air Chief Marshal	Anne, Princess Royal (2023–present)	

== See also ==
- Equerry
- Aide-de-camp
