= Gerald William Lascelles =

British author

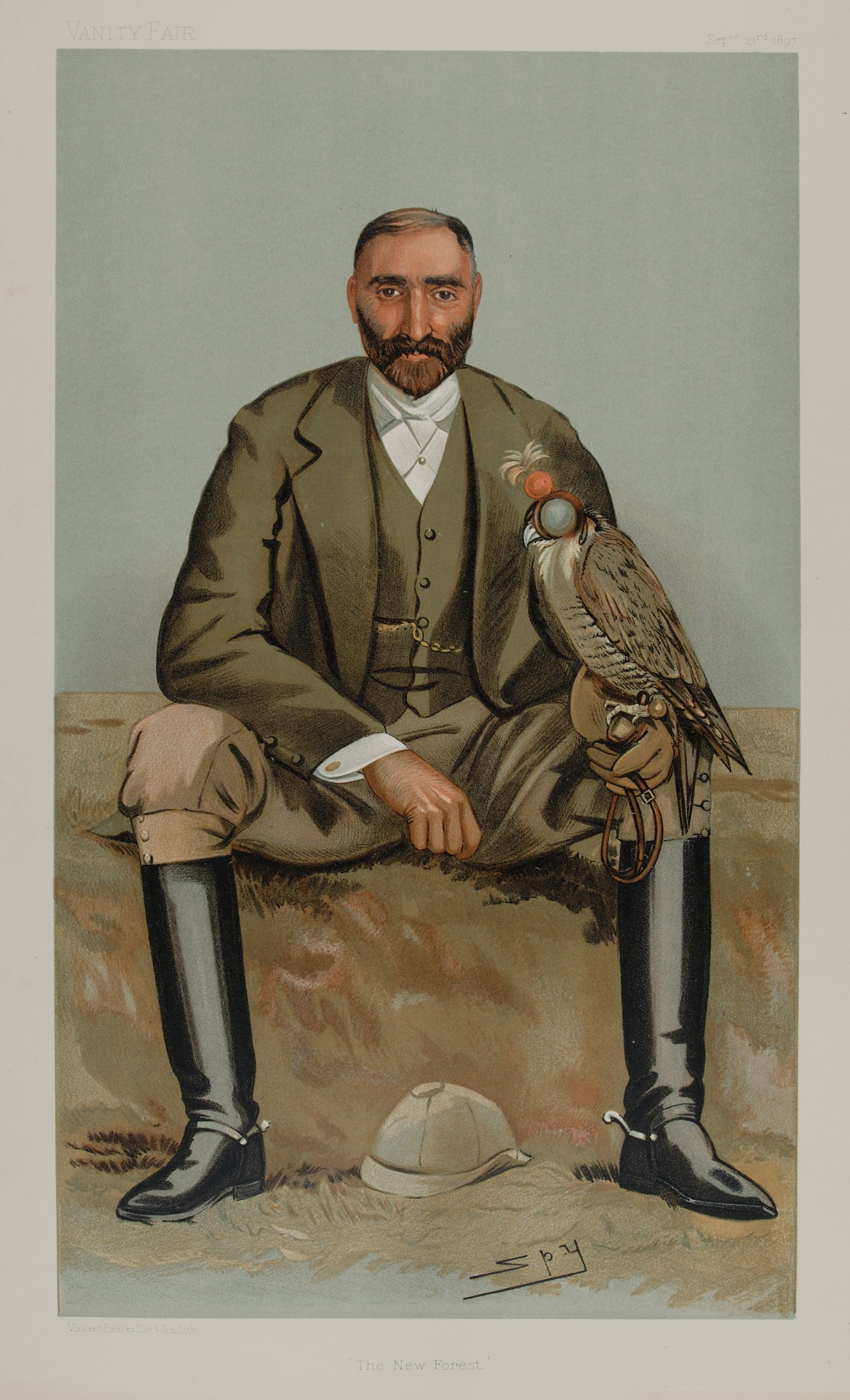
1897 Vanity Fair caricature by Spy.

The Honourable Gerald William Lascelles CB (26 October 1849 – 11 February 1928) was a British author and Deputy Surveyor of the New Forest from 1880 to 1914, and writer of an important book on the area, Thirty Five Years in the New Forest.

He was born at Goldsborough Hall in Yorkshire, the third son of the 4th Earl of Harewood and Lady Elizabeth Joanna de Burgh, daughter of 1st Marquess of Clanricarde. He graduated from Cambridge University with a Bachelor of Arts. Lascelles was invested as a Companion of The Most Honourable Order of the Bath (C.B.) in the 1914 Birthday Honours.

Alongside arguably his most famous work on the New Forest, he authored Sport in the New Forest and Forestry and the New Forest in the Hampshire volumes of the Victoria County History, The Art of Falconry, and numerous other (mainly sporting) publications.

On 9 February 1875, he married Constance Augusta Mary FitzClarence Phillipson, the daughter of John Burton Phillipson, and had four children with her.

- Gerald Hubert Lascelles (23 April 1876 – 13 July 1928)
- John Beilby Lascelles (19 February 1884 – 13 November 1907)
- Richard Lascelles (born and died 30 November 1887)
- Cynthia Rachael Lascelles (29 August 1885 – 6 September 1961), who married George Wentworth Warwick Bampfylde, 4th Baron Poltimore.
