= Marion Stein =

Austrian-born British concert pianist

Marion Stein CBE
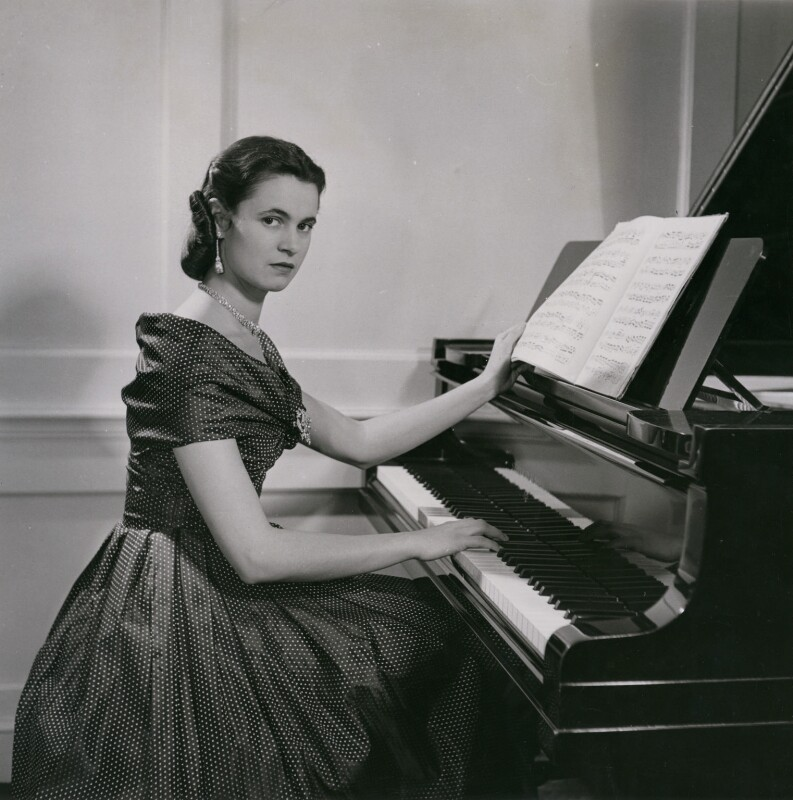
- Stein in 1947, by David Gurney
- Born: 18 October 1926; Vienna, Austria
- Died: 6 March 2014 (aged 87)
- Other names: Marion Lascelles, Countess of Harewood; Marion Harewood; Marion Thorpe
- Education: Royal College of Music
- Occupation: Concert pianist
- Spouses: George Lascelles, 7th Earl of Harewood (m. 1949; div. 1967) Jeremy Thorpe (m. 1973)
- Children: David Lascelles, 8th Earl of Harewood; James Lascelles; Jeremy Lascelles
- Parents: Erwin Stein; Sophie Bachmann

Maria Donata Nanetta Paulina Gustava Erwina Wilhelmine Stein (18 October 1926 – 6 March 2014), known as Marion Stein, was an Austrian-born British concert pianist. During her marriage to George Lascelles, Earl of Harewood, she was known as Marion Lascelles, Countess of Harewood and was a member of the extended British royal family. After her divorce and subsequent remarriage to British politician Jeremy Thorpe, leader of the Liberal Party from 1967 to 1976, she became known as Marion Thorpe.

== Career ==
Stein was born in Vienna to a Jewish family, the daughter of Sophie Bachmann and musician Erwin Stein. She came to the United Kingdom just before the Second World War. She attended the Royal College of Music and became good friends with composer Benjamin Britten.

By 1949, as Countess of Harewood, and with the patronage of her mother-in-law, Princess Mary, Stein was chatelaine of the Palladian Harewood House, north of Leeds, and threw herself into organising events.

In March 1950, she created an opera-inspired fancy dress ball in aid of Britten's English Opera Group, featuring Frederick Ashton and Moira Shearer dancing the tango from the ballet Façade. In September 1950, she was reported as being pregnant and, unusually for society women of the time, "planning to attend every night" of the Leeds Triennial Musical Festival which featured a performance by Britten. She was the joint founder in 1961 (along with Fanny Waterman) of the Leeds International Piano Competition. She also collaborated with Fanny Waterman on Piano Lessons, a successful piano tutor.

In 1973, she was a guest on BBC Radio 4's Desert Island Discs and she was an occasional panellist on the BBC music quiz Face the Music.

== Personal life ==
Stein married twice, on both occasions to prominent public figures.

Her first husband was George Lascelles, 7th Earl of Harewood, whom she married on 29 September 1949. The couple met at the Aldeburgh Festival. Lord Harewood, son of Mary, Princess Royal, was the grandson of King George V, the nephew of kings Edward VIII and George VI, and a cousin of Queen Elizabeth II. Marion became the Countess of Harewood. They had three sons:

- David Lascelles, 8th Earl of Harewood (born 21 October 1950)
- James Lascelles (born 5 October 1953)
- Jeremy Lascelles (born 14 February 1955)

By 1959, there were serious problems in the marriage. Harewood began an affair with the violinist Patricia Tuckwell, but Stein rejected the idea of divorce until 1967, by which time Harewood had a son by Tuckwell. His adultery and remarriage made him a social outcast for several years, and it was 10 years before he was invited to any events by the royal family.

Stein married her second husband, Jeremy Thorpe, on 14 March 1973. Thorpe was then a Member of Parliament and Leader of the Liberal Party. His first wife, Caroline, had been killed in a car accident in 1970. Marion Thorpe stood by her husband throughout the scandal of the late 1970s. In the mid-1980s, Jeremy Thorpe was diagnosed as suffering from Parkinson's disease. Towards the end of her life, Marion Thorpe also had mobility problems.

She was appointed a Commander of the Order of the British Empire (CBE) in the 2008 Birthday Honours by Elizabeth II for services to music, in particular the Leeds International Piano Competition.

Marion Thorpe died on 6 March 2014 at the age of 87. Her husband survived her by nine months, dying on 4 December.

== Posthumous recognition ==
She was played by Monica Dolan in the 2018 television miniseries A Very English Scandal.

Her name is one of those featured on the sculpture Ribbons, unveiled in 2024.
