= Francesca Lombardo =

- Also known as: Jackie Misfit
- Born: August 28, 1978 (age 48); Castiglione delle Stiviere, Lombardy, Italy
- Origin: London, England, United Kingdom
- Genres: Techno; house; deep house; tech house
- Occupations: Musician, record producer, disc jockey
- Instruments: Synthesizers; Piano; Vocals
- Years active: 1999–present
- Labels: Lokomotiv Recordings; Echo; Echolette; Crosstown Rebels; Rebellion; Leftroom; Get Physical; Flying Circus

Francesca Lombardo (Italian pronunciation: [franˈtʃeska lomˈbardo]; born August 27, 1978) is an Italian electronic music producer and DJ from Castiglione delle Stiviere, Lombardy. At age 13, Francesca Lombardo joined the Conservatorium of music in Italy where she studied and graduated in vocal techniques and piano.

== Early career ==
=== Jackie Misfit ===
In 1999, she moved to London and started her career in the underground techno scene using the alias Jackie Misfit. Lombardo started playing at underground parties around the capital. She soon became a resident at a UK Techno night called Chemical Warfare, which was held at what is now known as Great Suffolk Street Warehouse. In 2006, she became a resident DJ at Ultraplay events held at Cafe 1001 in London. To this day, Jackie Misfit is Ultraplay’s longest-standing resident.

During this time, Lombardo was involved in a number of side projects including an all female electro/rock/drum n' bass band called Purity playing keyboards and mixing tracks whilst also singing and playing keyboards in another band called Def by Disco.

=== Lokomotiv Recordings ===
2007 saw Jackie Misfit co-found Lokomotiv Recordings alongside another Italian DJ / producer Achille Soardi also known as Kende and INTO YOU. Jackie Misfit’s first release, "Mama Cocha", came out on Lokomotiv in 2008 as part of a 3-track EP called The Dark Side Of The Spoon. Mama Cocha – the Remixes, was released in 2009 and featured remixes from Valentino Kanzyani and Tomy DeClerque, Bypass FX, and Mauro Alpha & Andrea Paganin.

=== Echoe / Echolette ===
In early 2010, Lombardo started her own imprint, Echolette. The "Kundi la Mapendo" EP by Jackie Misfit marked the labels first release. Since then, Echolette has charted releases by Hector Couto, Gregor Tresher & Birds of Mind. Lombardo now also runs a sister label to Echolette called Echoe which launched in 2016 and has charted releases from herself under her given name, as well as Manuela Gandolfo & INTO YOU.

== Crosstown Rebels ==
In 2011, Lombardo met Damian Lazarus, founder of the Crosstown Rebels label, at the Winter Music Conference in Miami. Damian signed her to the label and Lombardo's first outing was a remix for New York duo Walker & Royce. Leaving behind the moniker of Jackie Misfit, Lombardo continued to release under her own name and Changes, released 2012, was her first 4-track EP on Crosstown. Francesca was a regular addition to Crosstown Rebels parties and most notably performed over 10 dates on the Crosstown Rebels Rebel Rave world tour in 2013, which celebrated ten years since the label's incarnation.

== Present-day ==
Lombardo was invited to speak twice at the International Music Summit in Ibiza in 2013. The first panel discussed empowering women in music and how women survive in a predominantly male industry. The second panel was titled "New Faces, New Thinking" and the dialogue was around how to get noticed as a new producer/DJ. Lombardo sat alongside David August, Eats Everything, Hot Since 82, Sam Evitt, and Steven Braines. Francesca was invited back to the International Music Summit in 2016 to speak once more on "The New Breed" panel along with Kölsch, Dany Daze, and Danny Howard. Lombardo also performed at the closing party of the event which was held at the Dalt Villa Battlements.

In recent years, Lombardo has continued to DJ at parties around the world with standout shows at Fabric London, DC10 in Ibiza, and Burning Man festival in Nevada where she has spent two birthdays. She has also developed a live act bringing together the more classical elements of her musical training. This live show often incorporates Lombardo singing and playing synths alongside a string section.
