= Jeremy Lascelles =

British music industry executive (born 1955)

The Honourable Jeremy Lascelles
- Born: Robert Jeremy Hugh Lascelles; 14 February 1955 (age 71); Bayswater, London, England
- Occupations: Music executive, musician
- Spouses: Julie Baylis (m. 1981; div. 1998); Catherine Bell (m. 1999)
- Children: 4
- Parents: George Lascelles, 7th Earl of Harewood; Marion Stein

Robert Jeremy Hugh Lascelles (born 14 February 1955) is a British music industry executive and occasional musician. He is a second cousin of King Charles III.

== Life ==
Lascelles is the third child of George Lascelles, 7th Earl of Harewood, and Marion Stein, who later married Jeremy Thorpe. He is a great-grandson of King George V. He was educated at Westminster School, Westminster in London.

He is a former CEO of Chrysalis Music plc. He has been involved in the music industry since the early 1970s. This included playing percussion for the Global Village Trucking Company, for whom his older brother James Lascelles played keyboards. He then became a tour manager in the 1970s for bands including Curved Air before moving to Virgin in 1979. He rose to Head of A&R under Richard Branson at Virgin where he worked for 13 years with acts such as Phil Collins, Culture Club, the Human League, and Simple Minds and set up his own independent label (Offside Records - named after his favourite cricket shot) before being hired by Chris Wright of Chrysalis in 1994 as CEO. He is known for his ambivalence to being related to the royal family (his godmother was Queen Elizabeth the Queen Mother).

Lascelles stood down as CEO of Chrysalis Music in March 2012 and was subsequently named as a visiting professor at Leeds College of Music (LCoM), a role which commenced in October 2012.

As Chief Executive of the Music Division and later CEO of Chrysalis, he signed or oversaw the signings of acts including Portishead, David Gray, OutKast, Ray LaMontagne, Feeder, Cee-Lo Green, Laura Marling, Bon Iver, Fleet Foxes and Rumer. Lascelles was elected to the council of the BPI in 2003 and from 2004-2007 he served on the board of AIM as Vice-Chairman. He was shortlisted for the Orange Business Leader of the Year award in 2010. In 2014 he started Blue Raincoat Music, and presently heads up the company. In 2016 Blue Raincoat Music acquired full ownership of the British independent label Chrysalis Records, including the rosters of The Specials, Sinéad O'Connor, The Waterboys, Ten Years After, Fun Boy Three, Ultravox, Generation X, 2 Tone Records, and much more. He is also an ardent Leeds United supporter. Lascelles thinks himself very fortunate to have worked for 50 odd years at what he considers his hobby.

=== Marriage and children ===
On 4 July 1981 in London, he married Julie Baylis (born 19 July 1957 in Droitwich Spa, Worcestershire) and divorced in June 1998. They had one son (Thomas) and two daughters (Ellen and Amy).

On 7 January 1999 in Edinburgh he married Catherine Isobel Bell (born 25 April 1972 in Lewisham, London). They had one daughter (Tallulah).

British royalty
Preceded by Sophie Lascelles	Line of succession to the British throne descended from Mary, daughter of George V	Succeeded by Thomas Lascelles
