= George Lascelles, 7th Earl of Harewood =

British noble and author (1923–2011)

The Right Honourable The Earl of Harewood KBE AM

Member of the House of Lords as Earl of Harewood
- In office 7 February 1956 – 11 November 1999
- Preceded by: Henry Lascelles
- Succeeded by: House of Lords Act 1999

Personal details
- Born: The Honourable George Henry Hubert Lascelles; 7 February 1923 London, England
- Died: 11 July 2011 (aged 88) Harewood, England
- Resting place: All Saints' Church, Harewood
- Spouses: Marion Stein (m. 1949; div. 1967) Patricia Tuckwell (m. 1967)
- Children: David Lascelles, 8th Earl of Harewood; James Lascelles; Jeremy Lascelles; Mark Lascelles
- Parents: Mary, Princess Royal; Henry Lascelles, 6th Earl of Harewood
- Education: Ludgrove School; Eton College; King's College, Cambridge

George Henry Hubert Lascelles, 7th Earl of Harewood (7 February 1923 – 11 July 2011), styled The Honourable George Lascelles before 1929 and Viscount Lascelles between 1929 and 1947, was a British classical music administrator and author, and a member of the extended British royal family. He served as director of the Royal Opera House (1951–1953; 1969–1972), chairman of the board of the English National Opera (ENO) (1986–1995); managing director of the ENO (1972–1985), managing director of the English National Opera North (1978–81), governor of the BBC (1985–1987), and president of the British Board of Film Classification (1985–1996).

Harewood was the elder son of the 6th Earl of Harewood and Princess Mary, Princess Royal, the only daughter of King George V and Queen Mary. At his birth, he was sixth in the line of succession; at his death, he was 46th. Lord Harewood was the eldest grandchild of King George V and Queen Mary, nephew of both King Edward VIII and King George VI and first cousin of Queen Elizabeth II. He was the director of the Edinburgh Festival from 1961 to 1965

== Early life ==
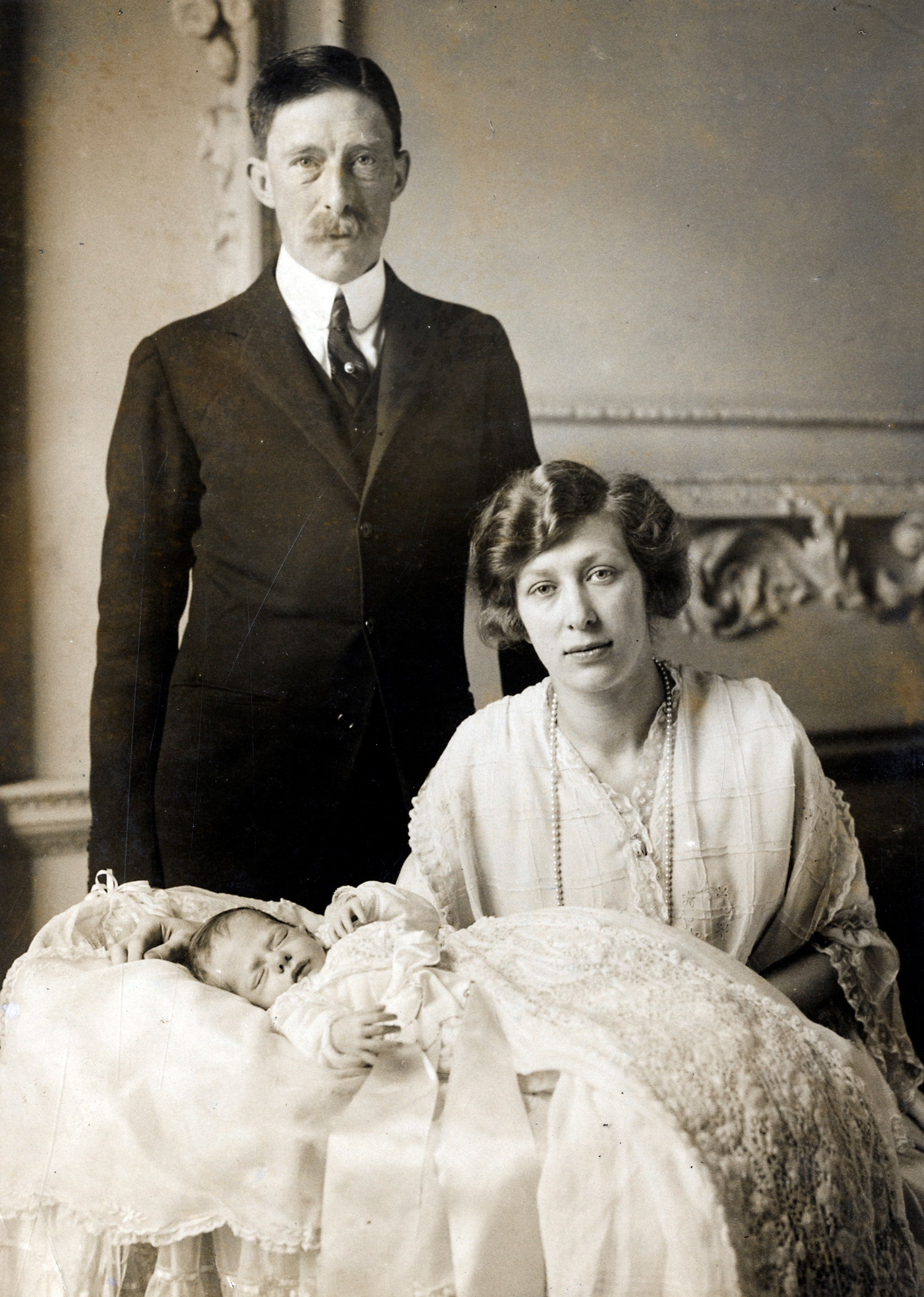
Lascelles at Chesterfield House, 1923

George Henry Hubert Lascelles was born on 7 February 1923 at his parents' London home Chesterfield House. He was the first child of Henry, Viscount Lascelles, and Princess Mary, Viscountess Lascelles, and first grandchild of King George V and Queen Mary, who stood as sponsors at his christening. The ceremony took place on 25 March at St Mary's Church in the village of Goldsborough, near Knaresborough adjoining the family home, Goldsborough Hall. After his paternal grandfather's death in 1929, he was styled Viscount Lascelles when his father succeeded to the earldom. He served as a Page of Honour at the coronation of his uncle, King George VI in May 1937.

He was raised at Harewood House in Yorkshire and educated at Ludgrove School, Eton College, and King's College, Cambridge. His time at university was interrupted by the Second World War.

== Military service ==
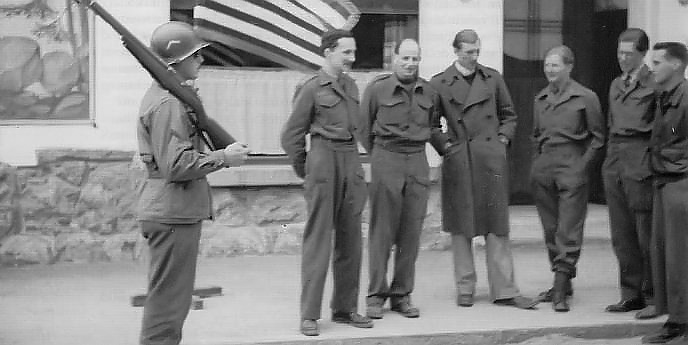
Lascelles with fellow Prominente after his release: John Alexander Elphinstone (his aunt by-marriage, Queen Elizabeth's nephew), Churchill's cousin Max de Hamel, Michael Alexander and John Winant Jr. among them.

Lascelles joined the British Army and was commissioned as a second lieutenant into the Grenadier Guards, his father's regiment, in 1942. He attained the rank of captain. Serving with the regiment's 3rd Battalion, part of the 1st Guards Brigade of the 78th Infantry Division (later transferred to the 6th Armoured Division), he saw action in North Africa and Italy. He was wounded and captured at Monte Corno on 18 June 1944, the anniversary of both his father's injury in the First World War and the Battle of Waterloo, in which his great-great-grandfather had been injured.

He was held as a prisoner of war in Oflag IV-C (Colditz) until May 1945. As the nephew of George VI, Lascelles was one of the Prominente at Colditz, regarded by the Nazis as a potential bargaining asset.

We thought it was absolutely ridiculous. There were about half a dozen of us with well-known connections and we were of absolutely no importance ourselves. We were all let's call it relatively junior officers from (age) 30-something downwards. Our fear was that someone would rumble that the bargaining power was a great deal less than they'd at first thought it was – they'd calculated one way and then it turned out another, and then we'd become expendable. That was our fear. And once the Wehrmacht, the army, lost interest in us, we were frightened of becoming prisoners of the Gestapo or something like this which would have become very disagreeable. We just avoided it. We spent the last night of our time not at Colditz but actually in Austria by then, where the guns of the guards were pointing outwards at the Gestapo who might come in rather than in at us who might try to get out.

— Lord Harewood, Desert Island Discs, 1982

In March 1945, Adolf Hitler signed his death warrant. Gottlob Berger, the SS general responsible for prisoner-of-war camps, realised the war was lost, refused to carry out the order, and released Lascelles to the Swiss authorities.

In 1945–46, he served as aide-de-camp to his great-uncle, Lord Athlone, then Governor General of Canada. Lascelles served as a Counsellor of State in 1947, 1953–54, and 1956.

== House of Lords ==
Lascelles succeeded his father in 1947. On 7 February 1956, he took his seat in the House of Lords. He lost his seat following the House of Lords Act 1999, which removed most hereditary peers from membership.

== Career ==
=== Opera ===
A music enthusiast, Lascelles devoted most of his career to opera, with his Yorkshire heritage fostering his interest. In March 1949, as a young single man, he was among the audience at Leeds Town Hall for a performance of operatic works by the Yorkshire Symphony Orchestra. By 1950, he had become patron of the orchestra's concerts. He served as editor of Opera magazine from 1950 to 1953. In February 1950, it was reported that he had launched the magazine at a large party at the London home of Richard Buckle, attended by many music lovers.

He was director of the Royal Opera House, Covent Garden, from 1951 to 1953 and again from 1969 to 1972. He served as chairman of the board of the English National Opera (ENO) from 1986 to 1995, and as Managing Director of the ENO from 1972 to 1985. He was Artistic Director of both the Edinburgh and Adelaide Festivals. From 1958 to 1974, he was General/Artistic Director of the Leeds Triennial Musical Festival. He was Managing Director of the ENO offshoot English National Opera North from 1978 to 1981. Lascelles served as a governor of the BBC from 1985 to 1987 and as the president of the British Board of Film Classification from 1985 to 1996.

He was the author or editor of three books: Kobbé's Complete Opera Book (ed. 1954, later The New Kobbé's Opera Book, edited with Antony Peattie, latest ed. 1997; and The New Pocket Kobbé's Opera Book, edited with his stepson Michael Shmith, 2000), The Tongs and the Bones (an autobiography, 1981), and Kobbé's Illustrated Opera Book (ed. 1989). He was chairman of Historic Masters, an unusual vinyl record label dedicated to high-quality issues of rare historic 78 rpm recordings of opera singers. A friend and colleague of Maria Callas, he appeared in the 1968 EMI documentary The Callas Conversations Vol. I, in which he interviewed Callas at length about her career and views on opera.

=== Football ===
His other interests included football. He served as president of Leeds United Football Club from 1961 until his death and was president of the Football Association from 1963 to 1972.

=== Public life ===
Lascelles was the only person to serve as Counsellor of State without being a Prince of the United Kingdom, holding the role from 1945 to 1951 and again from 1952 to 1956. He served as chancellor of the University of York from 1963 to 1967.

== Personal life ==
=== Marriages and children ===
On 29 September 1949 at St. Mark's Church, London, Lascelles married Marion Stein, a concert pianist and daughter of the Viennese music publisher Erwin Stein. Because of Lascelles's position in the line of succession, the marriage required the sovereign's approval under the Royal Marriages Act 1772. Queen Mary, mother of George VI, objected to the match, but permission was eventually granted. Benjamin Britten, a friend of the Stein family, composed an anthem, "Amo Ergo Sum", for the ceremony.

Lascelles and Stein had three sons:

- David Henry George Lascelles, 8th Earl of Harewood, born 21 October 1950. He married Margaret Messenger on 12 February 1979; they divorced in 1989. They have four children and seven grandchildren. He married Diane Howse on 11 March 1990.
- The Hon. James Edward Lascelles, born 5 October 1953. He married Frederica Ann Duhrssen on 4 April 1973; they divorced in 1985. They have two children and one granddaughter. He married Lori Lee on 4 May 1985; they divorced in 1996. They have two children and one grandson. He married Joy Elias-Rilwan on 30 January 1999.
- The Hon. Robert Jeremy Hugh Lascelles, born 14 February 1955. He married Julie Bayliss on 4 July 1981; they later divorced. They have three children and five grandchildren. He married Catherine Bell on 7 January 1999, and they have a daughter.

Lascelles and Stein divorced in 1967, after his mistress, Patricia "Bambi" Tuckwell – an Australian violinist and sister of the musician Barry Tuckwell – gave birth to his son. The affair caused a major scandal at the time and led to the couple being ostracised for several years, even after the relationship was formalised. Stein later married the politician Jeremy Thorpe.

Lascelles married Tuckwell (24 November 1926 – 4 May 2018) on 31 July 1967. The wedding took place at Waveny Park in New Canaan, Connecticut. They were obliged to marry abroad because, in England, registry office marriages were barred for those covered by the Royal Marriages Act, and divorcees could not marry in the Church of England. They had one son, Mark Lascelles.

=== Death ===
Lascelles died at his home, Harewood House, on 11 July 2011, aged 88. A private, but well-attended funeral was held there on 15 July.

== Honours ==
Queen Elizabeth II created him a Knight Commander of the Order of the British Empire (KBE) in the Queen's Birthday Honours List on 13 June 1986. On 1 July 2010 he was appointed an Honorary Member of the Order of Australia (AM), "for service to the arts in Australia and to supporting Australia's artists in the United Kingdom".

In 1959, Harewood received the Grand Decoration in Silver with Sash for Services to the Republic of Austria.

Country	Date	Appointment	Ribbon	Post-nominal letters	Notes
United Kingdom	6 May 1935	King George V Silver Jubilee Medal			
United Kingdom	12 May 1937	King George VI Coronation Medal			
United Kingdom	1945	1939–1945 Star			
United Kingdom	1945	Italy Star			
United Kingdom	1945	Defence Medal			
United Kingdom	1945	War Medal			
United Kingdom	2 June 1953	Queen Elizabeth II Coronation Medal			
United Kingdom	6 February 1977	Queen Elizabeth II Silver Jubilee Medal			
United Kingdom	14 June 1986	Knight Commander of the Order of the British Empire		KBE	
United Kingdom	6 February 2002	Queen Elizabeth II Golden Jubilee Medal			
Australia	1 July 2010	Member of the Order of Australia		AM	
Austria	1959	Grand Decoration of Honour in Silver with Sash of Honour for Services to the Republic of Austria			

== Arms ==
Coat of arms of George Lascelles, 7th Earl of Harewood
Notes The arms of the Earl of Harewood consist of: Coronet Aside from the earl's coronet displayed here, he is also entitled to display the coronet of a child of a daughter of the sovereign. Crest A Bear's Head couped at the neck Ermine, muzzled Gules, buckled Or, collared Gules, rimed and studded Or. Helm that of a Peer Escutcheon of Lascelles: Sable, a Cross-Patoncé within a Bordure, Or. Supporters On either side a Bear Ermine, muzzled and collared Gules, buckled with chain reflexed over the back Or, the collar studded and rimmed Gold, and pendent therefrom an Escutcheon Sable, charged with a Cross-Patoncé Gold Motto "IN SOLO DEO SALUS" Translation to English: In salvation to God alone. Orders That of a Knight Commander of the Order of the British Empire; For God & Country

== Books ==
The Tongs and the Bones: The Memoirs of Lord Harewood, published by George Weidenfeld & Nicolson (1981), ISBN 0-297-77960-5 is George Lascelles's autobiography.

Cultural offices
Preceded by Anthony Steel	Director of the Adelaide Festival of Arts; 1988	Succeeded by Clifford Hocking
Academic offices
New title	Chancellor of the University of York; 1962–1967	Succeeded by Kenneth Clark
Sporting positions
Preceded by The Duke of Gloucester	President of The Football Association; 1963–1971	Succeeded by The Duke of Kent
Media offices
Preceded by The Lord Harlech	President of the British Board of Film Classification; 1985–1997	Succeeded by Andreas Whittam Smith
Peerage of the United Kingdom
Preceded by Henry Lascelles	Earl of Harewood; 1947–2011	Succeeded by David Lascelles
