= Florence Lascelles, Countess of Harewood =

English noblewoman

Florence Lascelles, Countess of Harewood (12 February 1859 – 5 May 1943), was the wife of Henry Lascelles, 5th Earl of Harewood and mother of Henry Lascelles, 6th Earl of Harewood.

Born Lady Florence Katharine Bridgeman, youngest daughter of Orlando Bridgeman, 3rd Earl of Bradford and his wife, the former Selina Weld-Forester, she grew up at Weston Park. She married the future earl, Viscount Lascelles, on 5 November 1881 at St Peter's Church, Eaton Square, London. They lived at Goldsborough Hall until 1892, when her husband inherited his father's earldom and they moved to Harewood House.

The couple had three children:

- Henry Lascelles, 6th Earl of Harewood (1882–1947), who married Mary, Princess Royal, the only daughter of King George V, and had two sons who were at the time of their birth 6th and 7th in line of succession to the British throne
- Lady Margaret Selina Lascelles (1883–1978), who married Gustavus Hamilton-Russell, 9th Viscount Boyne and had children
- Major Edward Cecil Lascelles (1887–1935), who married Joan Balfour, a granddaughter of George Campbell, 8th Duke of Argyll.

The countess was appointed a Dame of Justice of the Order of St John of Jerusalem. She died on 5 May 1943 at Burwarton House, near Bridgnorth in Shropshire, the family home of her daughter Margaret, Viscountess Boyne.

In 2017, Harewood House held an exhibition of photographs taken by the countess, a keen amateur photographer.

== Arms ==
Coat of arms of Florence Lascelles, Countess of Harewood
Escutcheon Henry Lascelles, 5th Earl of Bradford (Sable a cross patonce within a bordure Or) impaling Orlando Bridgeman, 3rd Earl of Bradford (Sable ten plates four three two and one on a chief Argent a lion passant Ermines).
