= Erwin Stein =

Austrian musician and writer (1885–1958)

Erwin Stein (7 November 1885 – 19 July 1958) was an Austrian musician and writer, prominent as a pupil and friend of Arnold Schoenberg, with whom he studied between 1906 and 1910.

== Career ==
After studying at the University of Vienna, Stein was taught by Schoenberg from 1906. He subsequently worked as a conductor in the years before the First World War.

In 1918 Schoenberg founded the Society for Private Musical Performances, which presented modern compositions (from Mahler to the present day) to Viennese audiences. Stein was one of his principal assistants in this project which ran for a few years until encountering financial problems. The works performed often needed arrangement for the reduced forces available to the Society. Stein undertook such reductions, for example, in 1921 he arranged Mahler's Symphony No. 4 for 15 musicians. Also in 1921 he arranged Anton Bruckner's Seventh Symphony for chamber ensemble, this time with Hanns Eisler and Karl Rankl. The Society closed down before it could be performed.

In 1924 it was Stein to whom Schoenberg entrusted the delicate as well as important task of writing the first article – Neue Formprinzipien ('New Formal Principles') – on the gradual evolution of what was soon to be explicitly formulated as 'twelve-tone technique'.

Until 1938 he lived in Vienna, working for the music publisher Universal Edition and respected as a music teacher and conductor as well as a writer active on behalf of the music and composers he valued. At Universal one of his tasks was to complete a vocal score of the unfinished third act of Alban Berg’s Lulu.

After the Anschluss during the course of Aryanization, Stein was forced to sell his stockholdings in Universal Edition. He fled to London to escape the Nazis and worked for many years as an editor for the music publisher Boosey & Hawkes. His focus was mainly on Mahler, Schoenberg and Britten (all three of whom he knew personally) as well as his colleagues within the Schoenberg circle, Alban Berg and Webern.

== Legacy ==
His books include Orpheus in New Guises (a collection of writings from the period 1924–1953) and Form and Performance (1962).

He was the editor of the first collection of Schoenberg's letters (Germany 1958; UK 1964). He was also instrumental in setting up the modern music periodical Tempo in 1939.

Stein's arrangement of Mahler's Symphony No. 4 is still used occasionally. In 2020 it was revived by the Berlin Philharmonic during the COVID-19 pandemic. The orchestra was unable to play Mahler's original version, as had been scheduled, because of the restrictions of social distancing.

=== Discography ===
Stein's arrangement of Mahler's Symphony No. 4 was recorded by Royal Northern Sinfonia in 1999.

== Personal life ==
Stein married Sophie Bachmann (1882–1965), and their daughter, the pianist Marion Stein, married successively George Lascelles, 7th Earl of Harewood and the Liberal politician Jeremy Thorpe.

== See also ==
- List of émigré musicians from Nazi Europe who settled in Britain
