= Chris Wright (music executive) =

British businessman, founder of Chrysalis (born 1944)

Chris Wright CBE
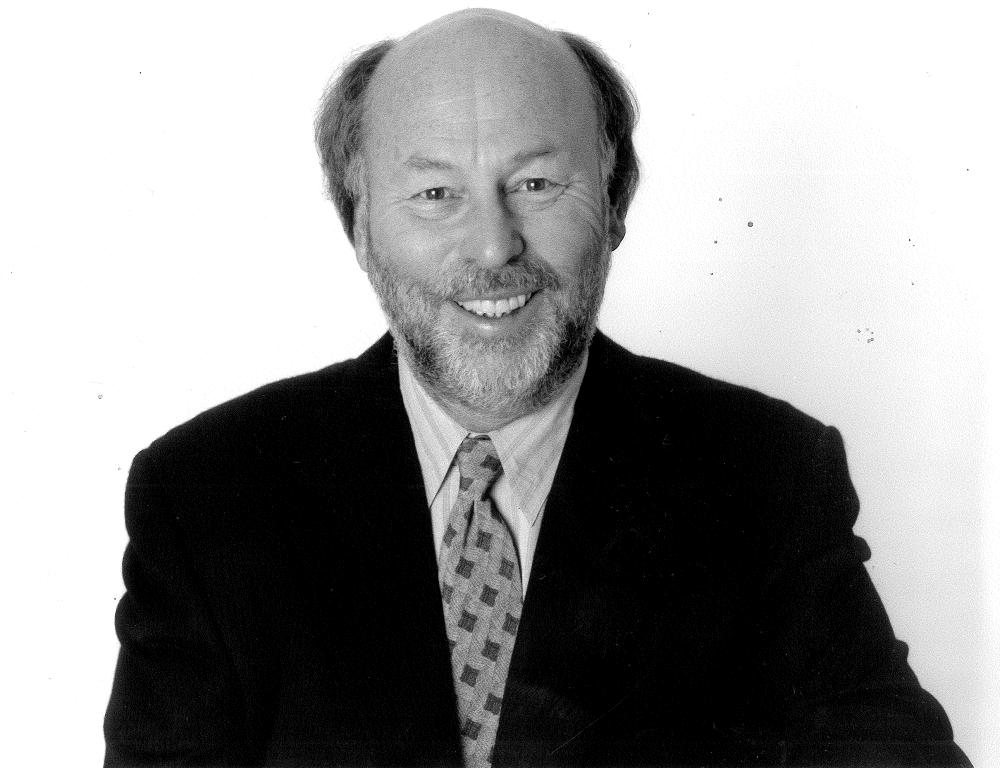
- Born: 7 September 1944 (age 81); Louth, Lincolnshire, England
- Occupations: Businessman; music industry executive
- Years active: 1964–present
- Spouse: Janice Wright
- Children: Timothy Wright; Thomas Wright; Chloe Wright; Holly Wright

Chris Wright, CBE (born Christopher Norman Wright on 7 September 1944) is an English music industry executive.

He has produced acts such as Ten Years After, Jethro Tull, Procol Harum, Blondie, Ultravox and Spandau Ballet.

He was the co-founder of Chrysalis Records and Music with his business partner Terry Ellis in 1968. Wright bought Ellis out in 1985, when the Chrysalis Group went public. Wright retained ownership of Chrysalis Music until 2010, when the publishing company was acquired by BMG Rights Management.

In the '90s, Wright launched the Heart commercial radio brand in Birmingham and London, and the Midsomer Murders detective drama series broadcast on ITV in the UK and over 225 TV channels around the world.

Between 1996 and 2001, Wright was the owner of Queens Park Rangers F.C. and the majority shareholder and chairman of Wasps Rugby Club. He continued as major shareholder and non-executive chairman of Wasps until 2008.

Wright was made a Commander of the Order of the British Empire (CBE) in 2005 for services to the Music and Entertainment Industries.

== Childhood and early life ==
Wright was born in Louth, Lincolnshire, the only son of the last in a long line of farmers, and grew up in Grimoldby. While attending King Edward VI Grammar School in Louth, he began submitting small articles to the Louth And District Standard newspaper and had ambitions to become a sports or political journalist. In his teens, he played table tennis.

== Career ==
In 1962, Wright went to Manchester University, where he gained a BA in Politics and Modern History. While at Manchester University, he became social secretary of the Students Union and began booking groups at the university as well as at the J&J Club. He enlisted for a further year at the Manchester Business School but attended so few classes he was not awarded a diploma. He began working for the Ian Hamilton Agency, representing Anna Ford, then a folk singer in the Joan Baez mould, and later a television presenter and newsreader.

In 1966, he discovered The Jaybirds, a band from Nottingham fronted by the virtuoso guitarist Alvin Lee. They had been backing three-hit wonders The Ivy League but Wright was more interested in the blues repertoire they had developed on their own. He became their manager and moved to London, where he teamed up with Terry Ellis, another social secretary turned booking agent, to form the Ellis-Wright agency. Wright masterminded the Jaybirds' transformation into Ten Years After and guided their career as one of the biggest British groups of the late 1960s and early '70s. He got them a record deal with Deram Records, the Decca label's hip subsidiary, and in 1967 they became the first British band to release an album before a single.

While Chairman of the BPI (British Phonographic Industry) in 1982, Wright relaunched the British Record Industry Awards, previously held in 1977, as an annual event, the forerunner of the BRITs. Inspired by the Grammys in the US, Wright's intention was to "celebrate great music and great artists in the previous year." With British music ruling the airwaves around the world, this proved a timely idea, recognised when Wright was presented with a Special Award at the event the following year.

On 13 October 2015, in recognition of Wright's career and contribution to music, he was awarded with a BASCA Gold Badge award.

== Chrysalis ==
Ten Years After's early success gave Ellis the funds to put Jethro Tull in the studio to record their This Was debut album, the first Chrysalis Production, issued via a licensing deal with Chris Blackwell's Island Records in 1968. "It was the foundation of the Chrysalis organisation,” said Wright. The partners put Wright's first name and Terry's surname together, the address they had been using for telegrams, to come up with the name Chrysalis.

Blackwell agreed he would give them their own label if they notched up 10 Top Ten albums or singles within three years. With guitarist Mick Abrahams leaving Jethro Tull to form Blodwyn Pig, and charting alongside his former bandmates, that target was reached within a year and Chrysalis, with its distinctive red butterfly logo over a green background, was born.

In 1971, Chrysalis Music signed David Bowie to a publishing deal but Wright was on tour in the US with Ten Years After when Ellis, his business partner, listened to a white-label copy of "Hunky Dory", and turned down the chance to sign the singer to a recording contract. "You get some right and you get some wrong," Wright reflected.

In the 1970s, Wright was particularly instrumental in the renewed success of Procol Harum, the emergence of their former guitarist Robin Trower as a solo artist, and the worldwide popularity of another Chrysalis signing, Leo Sayer. While attending a series of concerts by Sayer at the Roxy in Los Angeles in November 1976, Wright suggested that the soaring saxophone solo featured in the live version of "When I Need You" should be added to the album cut for its release a single. The new recording of "When I Need You" went on to top the UK and US charts the following year.

With Ellis concentrating on running Chrysalis in the US, Wright backed his hunches and made a raft of UK signings that paid huge dividends and proved culturally significant. In 1979, he offered The Specials a label deal for their 2-Tone imprint, and helped spearhead the ska revival which put them, Madness, The Beat and The Selecter in the charts and on Top of the Pops. The Specials' run of major hits included "Too Much Too Young", "Ghost Town" and "Free Nelson Mandela", three epochal records reflecting the turmoil and political changes and challenges of the late '70s and early '80s.

In 1980, Chrysalis became a key name for New Romantic music when Wright signed the reinvigorated Ultravox with new lead vocalist Midge Ure, and then Spandau Ballet – the London band who came to epitomise the genre even more than their rivals Duran Duran.

"We were cutting edge. We were able to pick up on everything – we kept our ears close to the ground," Wright told Classic Pop magazine in December 2013.

By the mid-1980s, Wright's partnership with Ellis had run out of steam. A mooted but costly move into films favoured by Ellis became a bone of contention and the eventual catalyst for their split. Wright bought his partner's 50% stake in Chrysalis and set about reinvigorating a company that was now listed on the London stockmarket. The subsequent signings of Go West, Paul Hardcastle and Living in a Box and the development of the Cooltempo subsidiary for dance and rap proved Wright still had his finger on the pulse of popular culture. The distribution deals Wright offered Go! Discs and China Records coincided with both imprints scoring major hits with The Housemartins as well as Art of Noise and Labi Siffre.

By then, the huge overheads involved in running a world-size independent company and the under-performance of several releases, notably Billy Idol's much-delayed Charmed Life album, had forced Wright to sell 50% of Chrysalis Records to EMI. The next year, EMI exercised its option to buy the other half, just after Wright's company topped the singles chart for the last time with a one-hit-wonder "The One And Only" by Chesney Hawkes.

Wright retained Chrysalis Music Publishing, whose catalogue included songs by David Bowie and Paul Anka, as well as Rod Temperton's compositions for Quincy Jones, George Benson and Michael Jackson. Over the next two decades, the company expanded its catalogue to over 50,000 songs through acquisitions and by signing singer-songwriters including David Gray, Nerina Pallot, Ray LaMontagne, Rumer, Natasha Kan (aka Bat For Lashes) and Laura Marling. BMG Rights Management acquired the company for £107 million in the late 2010.

== Sports ==
Wright's first foray into sports was with the Philadelphia Fury soccer franchise in the late 1970s. In 1994, the Chrysalis Group bought a stake in the Sheffield Forgers basketball team. Renamed the Sheffield Sharks, Wright relinquished his majority stake in 2001.

In 1996, Wright bought Queens Park Rangers (QPR) Football Club, which had just been relegated from the Premier League, and a 51% stake in Wasps rugby club. He brought both under the Loftus Road PLC umbrella with the intention that both teams would share the stadium. He did not succeed in taking QPR back into the top tier and sold the club in 2001. On the other hand, as rugby union turned professional, Wasps enjoyed a golden spell, winning 10 trophies between 1996 and 2008, when Wright sold his controlling interest. Wright is Honorary Life President of Wasps.

== Racehorses ==
Wright has been involved in the thoroughbred racing industry since 1981, both as an owner in the UK, France, the United States and Australia, and also as a breeder through his Stratford Place Stud based in the Cotswolds in England. He has participated in the ownership of a number of champion horses and the Stratford Place Stud has bred horses at the highest level. His notable successes as an owner include Culture Vulture, the first English trained filly to win the Poule d'Essai des Pouliches, the French equivalent of the 1,000 Guineas, in 1992, Nicer, who won the Irish 1,000 Guineas in 1993, and Dark Angel, winner of the Middle Park Stakes in 2007, and now a successful stallion. With Willie Carson and Emily Asprey, Wright was the co-owner of Chriselliam, the winner of the 2013 Breeders' Cup Juvenile Fillies Turf, who was crowned champion two-year-old filly in Europe and Champion two-year-old horse in Great Britain. In June 2021, Wright's horse Wonderful Tonight won the Hardwicke Stakes at Royal Ascot.

== One Way or Another ==
His autobiography, One Way or Another – My Life in Music, Sport And Entertainment, was published by Omnibus Press in the UK in October 2013. In a four-star review in the Daily Express, Gerard Henderson said: "Chris Wright pulls no punches in telling his gripping, fascinating life story. The reviewer further commented: "This is a real who's who of the music business. It's also a playlist of the defining soundtracks of the past half century. From the hippie counter revolution, through to punk, the new romantics, ska and on to the music of the new millennium, Wright was at the heart of it all, forging careers for stars on both sides of the Atlantic."

Wright promoted his autobiography with a raft of media engagements in the UK. He was a "Listed Londoner" on the Robert Elms show on BBC Radio London and also guested on Sounds of the Seventies, hosted by Johnnie Walker, on BBC Radio 2.
