= Henry Lascelles, 5th Earl of Harewood =

British peer

The Right Honourable The Earl of Harewood GCVO TD JP
- Earl of Harewood
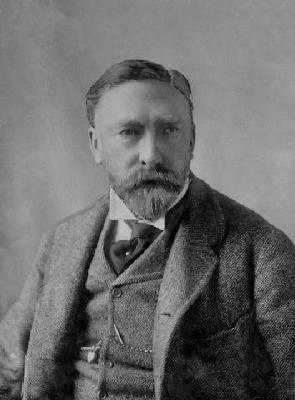
- Tenure: 1892–1929
- Born: 21 August 1846; Harewood House, West Yorkshire, England
- Died: 6 October 1929 (aged 83); Wetherby, West Yorkshire, England
- Spouse: Lady Florence Bridgeman (m. 1881)
- Issue: Henry Lascelles, 6th Earl of Harewood; Margaret Hamilton-Russell, Viscountess Boyne; Major Edward Lascelles
- Father: Henry Lascelles, 4th Earl of Harewood
- Mother: Lady Elizabeth de Burgh

Henry Ulick Lascelles, 5th Earl of Harewood GCVO TD JP (21 August 1846 – 6 October 1929) was a British peer and the son of Henry Lascelles, 4th Earl of Harewood.

== Biography ==
As a child, he lived at Goldsborough Hall in Goldsborough, North Yorkshire, which was the house for the heirs-in-waiting for Harewood House. During his lifetime the Lascelles family were still major landholders in Barbados.

He initially served in the regular army as captain in the Grenadier Guards, after which he served part-time as an officer in the Yorkshire Hussars Yeomanry, which became part of the Territorial Army in 1908. He was lieutenant colonel in command of that regiment from 1881 to 1898 and honorary colonel from 1898 to 1913. His long service with the yeomanry brought him the Territorial Decoration (T.D.) in 1909. He also held the post of colonel and yeomanry aide-de-camp to Queen Victoria from 1897, Edward VII throughout the latter's reign, and to George V from 1910 until his own death.

He succeeded to the titles of Earl of Harewood, Viscount Lascelles, and Baron Harewood on 24 June 1892.

He was a Deputy Lieutenant of the West Riding of Yorkshire on 26 February 1900, and Lord Lieutenant of the West Riding of Yorkshire on 4 June 1904, serving as such until 4 December 1927.

In early 1901 Lord Harewood was asked by King Edward to take part in a special diplomatic mission to announce the King's accession to the governments of France, Spain, and Portugal.

In 1908, he was appointed a Knight Commander of the Royal Victorian Order and was appointed a Knight Grand Cross of the Order in 1922.

== Marriage ==
On 5 November 1881 he married at St Peter's Church, Eaton Square, London, Lady Florence Katharine Bridgeman, daughter of Orlando Bridgeman, 3rd Earl of Bradford, and they had three children:

- Henry George Charles Lascelles, 6th Earl of Harewood (1882–1947), married Princess Mary, the only daughter of King George V and Queen Mary, and aunt of Queen Elizabeth II and had issue.
- Lady Margaret Selina Lascelles (1883–1978), married Gustavus Hamilton-Russell, 9th Viscount Boyne and had issue.
- Major Edward Cecil Lascelles (1887–1935), married Joan Balfour, a granddaughter of George Campbell, 8th Duke of Argyll.

== Ancestors ==
Ancestors of Henry Lascelles, 5th Earl of Harewood

8. Henry Lascelles, 2nd Earl of Harewood
4. Henry Lascelles, 3rd Earl of Harewood
9. Henrietta Sebright
2. Henry Lascelles, 4th Earl of Harewood
10. Thomas Thynne, 2nd Marquess of Bath
5. Lady Louisa Thynne
11. Elizabeth Byng
1. Henry Lascelles, 5th Earl of Harewood
12. John de Burgh, 13th Earl of Clanricarde
6. Ulick de Burgh, 1st Marquess of Clanricarde
13. Elizabeth Burke
3. Lady Elizabeth de Burgh
14. George Canning
7. Harriet Canning
15. Joan Canning, 1st Viscountess Canning

Honorary titles
Preceded by William Harrison-Broadley	Honorary Colonel of the Yorkshire Hussars; 1898–1913	Succeeded by The Lord Bolton
Preceded by The Earl of Scarbrough	Lord Lieutenant of the West Riding of Yorkshire; 1904–1927	Succeeded by Viscount Lascelles
Peerage of the United Kingdom
Preceded by Henry Lascelles	Earl of Harewood; 1892–1929	Succeeded by Henry Lascelles
