= Gerald David Lascelles =

English aristocrat (1924-1998)

The Honourable Gerald Lascelles

Personal details
- Born: 21 August 1924 Goldsborough Hall, Yorkshire, England
- Died: 27 February 1998 (aged 73) Bergerac, France
- Spouses: Angela Dowding (m. 1952; div. 1978); Elizabeth Collingwood (m. 1978)
- Children: 2
- Parents: Mary, Princess Royal; Henry Lascelles, 6th Earl of Harewood

Gerald David Lascelles (/ˈlæsəls/ LASS-əlss; 21 August 1924 – 27 February 1998) was the younger son of Henry Lascelles, 6th Earl of Harewood, and Mary, Princess Royal, the only daughter of King George V and Queen Mary. He was a first cousin of Queen Elizabeth II. He was styled The Honourable Gerald Lascelles.

== Life ==
Gerald David Lascelles was born at Goldsborough Hall, near Knaresborough, West Riding of Yorkshire, and was baptised in October 1924 with the Prince of Wales and the Duchess of York (later King Edward VIII and Queen Elizabeth) as his godparents represented there by proxies. The baptism was held in private at St. Mary's Church in the village of Goldsborough. At his birth, he was 7th in the line of succession. He was educated at Eton College.

=== Marriages and family ===
On 15 July 1952, he married Angela Dowding (20 April 1919 – 28 February 2007) at St. Margaret's, Westminster. They then moved into a house in Albion Mews, W2. In 1955, the family moved to Fort Belvedere, Surrey, the former country home of Gerald Lascelles's uncle, Edward VIII (the Duke of Windsor). Before divorcing in July 1978, they had one son:

- Henry Ulick Lascelles (born 19 May 1953), who married firstly Alexandra Morton (15 April 1953) on 25 August 1979 (divorced 20 October 1999) and secondly Fiona Wilmott on 2 June 2006. He has one son by his first marriage, Maximillian John Gerald, born 19 December 1991.

On 17 November 1978, Lascelles married his second wife, actress Elizabeth Colvin (née Elizabeth Evelyn Collingwood, 23 April 1924 – 14 January 2006), in Vienna, Austria. They had a son:

- Martin David Lascelles (born 9 February 1962, London). Martin married Charmaine Eccleston (b. 24 Dec 1962, Kingston, Jamaica) on 23 April 1999, and they have a son, Alexander Joshua, born on 20 September 2002. Martin also has an illegitimate daughter with singer Carol Anne Douet (b. 4 May 1962, London) named Georgina Elizabeth, born on 22 December 1988.

=== Interests and positions ===
Lascelles was the president of the British Racing Drivers' Club from 1964 to 1991, after the 5th Earl Howe died. Lord Howe had asked Lascelles to replace him, who was briefly a driver before this. In his role as BRDC president, Lascelles was invited by the Australian Racing Drivers Club, promoters of the Bathurst 1000 Touring car race, to be the Grand Marshal for the 1985 race. He served as president of the Institute of the Motor Industry in 1969-73 and 1975–77, and company director of Silverstone Circuits Ltd and Silverstone Leisure Ltd, Smith & Grace (Sales) Ltd, and Green Crop Conservation Ltd.

He was also a passionate jazz enthusiast, writing for Jazz Journal and collaborating with the magazine's editor Sinclair Traill in compiling the popular Just Jazz yearbooks in the 1950s.

=== Death ===
Lascelles died in Bergerac, France, on 27 February 1998 at the age of 73.

== Honours ==
- 12 May 1937: Recipient of the King George VI Coronation Medal.

Sporting positions
Preceded by The Earl Howe	BRDC President; 1964–1991	Succeeded by Innes Ireland
