= Thomas Lascelles (1624–1658) =

Thomas Lascelles (variously spelled both Lascelles and Lassells) (c. 1624 – c. 1658) was an officer in the Commonwealth's army and a landowner, responsible for Mount Grace Charterhouse, one of the few extant buildings from the period of the English Commonwealth.

== Early life ==
Lascelles was born in 1624, the son of William Lascelles and Elizabeth Wadeson. His brother was Francis Lascelles, who was an MP for the constituency of Northallerton and was involved in the trial of Charles the First.

== Army Service ==
During the Commonwealth period, Thomas was a captain in the army of Parliament (a Parliamentary note making it clear he had been in service since 1644) and served under Major General Thomas Harrison during the 1650s. He may well be the same man responsible for the capture on 1 April 1650 of Royalist privateer Captain Joseph Constant and his 30-man Dutch crew. After Constant's being sighted off the Yorkshire coast by a local fisherman, Lassells and Robert Colman led an attack party which surprised and captured them.

== Mount Grace Priory ==
In 1654 Thomas acquired Mount Grace Charterhouse and transformed part of the western range of the outer court into a house. This remains as a rare example of Commonwealth building in the UK.

== Death ==
Thomas died in or soon after 1658, as emerges from a 1672 inheritance dispute between his widow Ruth and their grandson, also named Thomas Lascelles, who was the heir of Mount Grace.
