= Henry Lascelles, 6th Earl of Harewood =

British soldier, peer and landowner (1882–1947)

Lieutenant Colonel The Right Honourable The Earl of Harewood KG GCVO DSO & Bar TD ADC JP DL
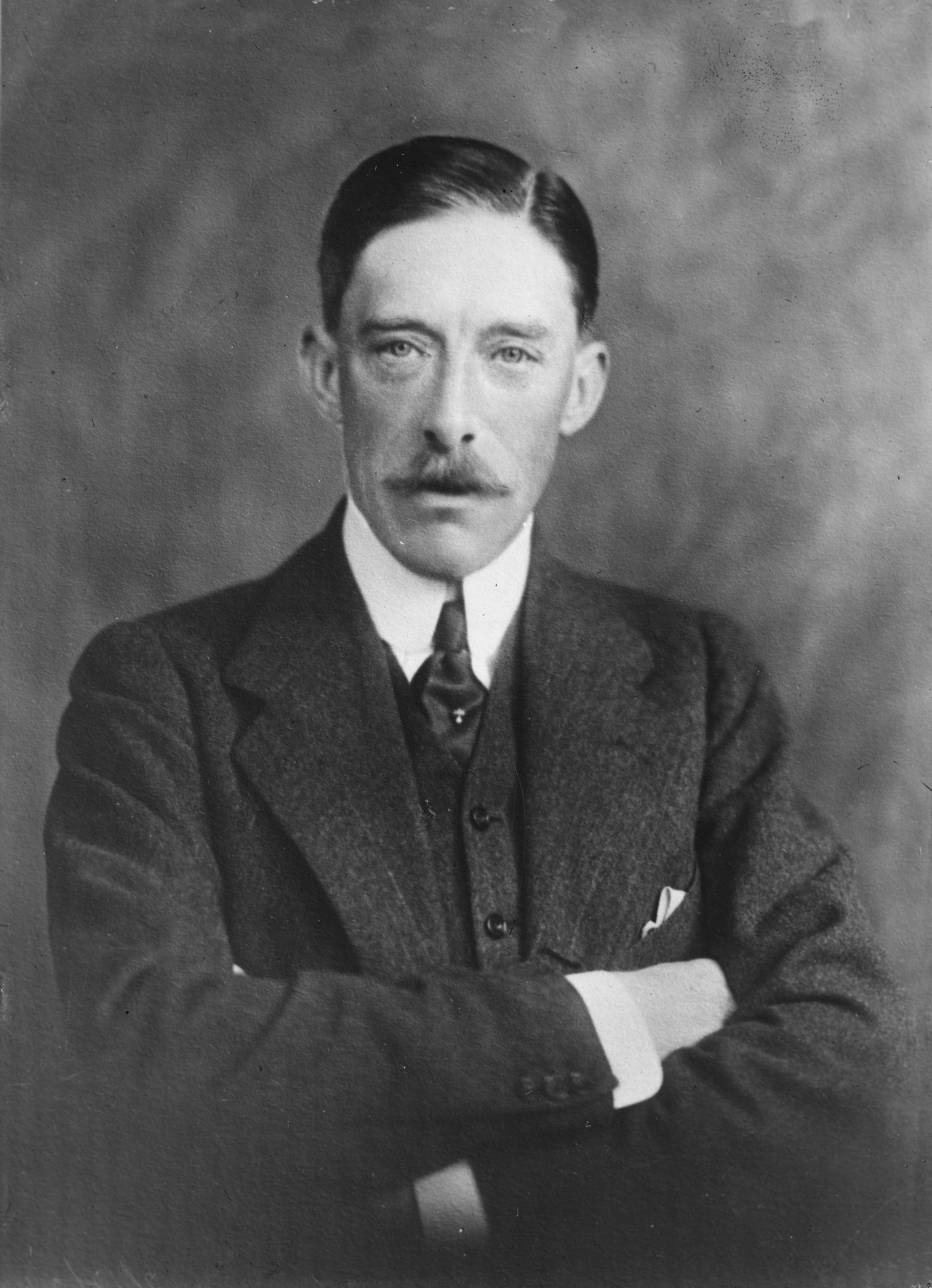
- Full name: Henry George Charles Lascelles
- Born: 9 September 1882; 43 Belgrave Square, London, England
- Died: 24 May 1947 (aged 64); Harewood House, Yorkshire, England
- Buried: 27 May 1947; All Saints Church, Harewood, Yorkshire
- Spouse: Mary, Princess Royal (m. 1922)
- Issue: George Lascelles, 7th Earl of Harewood; Gerald Lascelles
- Father: Henry Lascelles, 5th Earl of Harewood
- Mother: Lady Florence Bridgeman

Henry George Charles Lascelles, 6th Earl of Harewood (9 September 1882 – 24 May 1947), known by the courtesy title of Viscount Lascelles until 1929, was a British soldier and peer. He was the husband of Mary, Princess Royal, and thus son-in-law of King George V and Queen Mary and brother-in-law to kings Edward VIII and George VI.

== Early life and marriage ==
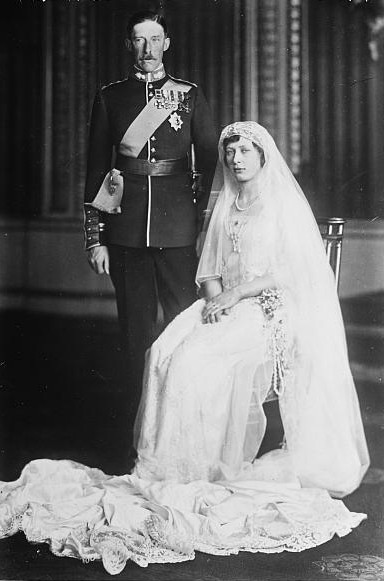
Wedding portrait of Princess Mary and Viscount Lascelles, 1922

Lascelles was the son of Henry Lascelles, 5th Earl of Harewood, and Lady Florence Bridgeman, daughter of Orlando Bridgeman, 3rd Earl of Bradford. He was born at the London home of his maternal grandfather, 43 Belgrave Square.

=== Inheritance and wealth ===
In 1916 Lascelles inherited the vast fortune of the 2nd Marquess of Clanricarde, his great-uncle. In a letter to his mother dated 20 April 1916, Lascelles estimated the gross value of his inheritance from Lord Clanricarde at £2,750,000, with a net value of around £2,000,000 after estate tax and expenses. From this, he anticipated that he would receive an annual income of £80,000, from which he would pay approximately £34,000 in income tax; privately, he expressed his disappointment that a fortune of nearly £3,000,000 would be reduced by taxation to a net annual income of £46,000.

=== Estates and residences ===
During Lascelles' youth, his father had sold the family's grand London townhouse in Hanover Square, Mayfair, in 1893. This house, also known as Harewood House (previously Roxburghe House), had been purchased by his great-great-grandfather Henry Lascelles, 2nd Earl of Harewood from John Ker, 3rd Duke of Roxburghe in 1795. In 1894, the 5th Earl of Harewood purchased a smaller London townhouse, 13 Upper Belgrave Street, which was later used by his mother following his father's death in 1929. The house was sold following the death of the Dowager Countess of Harewood in 1943.

In April 1918, an agreement was reached with the Dowager Lady Burton, widow of Michael Bass, 1st Baron Burton, for the purchase of a palatial London townhouse, Chesterfield House, for £140,000. The sale was finalised after the end of the First World War, and Lascelles took up residence there in 1919. In 1925, he purchased a country house and horse stud, Egerton House in Newmarket, Suffolk, which he used during the annual racing season. Following his death, Egerton House was sold.

In 1931, King George V and Queen Mary purchased 32 Green Street, Mayfair, as a London home for Princess Mary, rendering Chesterfield House surplus to the couple's needs. The Harewoods vacated Chesterfield House in early 1932. Queen Mary reportedly expressed an interest in purchasing 32 Green Street as a London house for her daughter in 1931, and consent was obtained from the property's owner, Hugh Grosvenor, 2nd Duke of Westminster, with the proviso that Grosvenor Estates could maintain the right to repurchase the house at a future date if its use as a royal residence ceased. The couple continued to occupy No. 32 Green Street when in London until the outbreak of the Second World War in 1939, and the House was repurchased by Grosvenor Estate in 1946; the house was later repurposed as the Embassy of Brazil. Following the outbreak of that War, the couple were given use of a small grace-and-favour apartment at St James's Palace, which continued to be their London residence for the remainder of their respective lives.

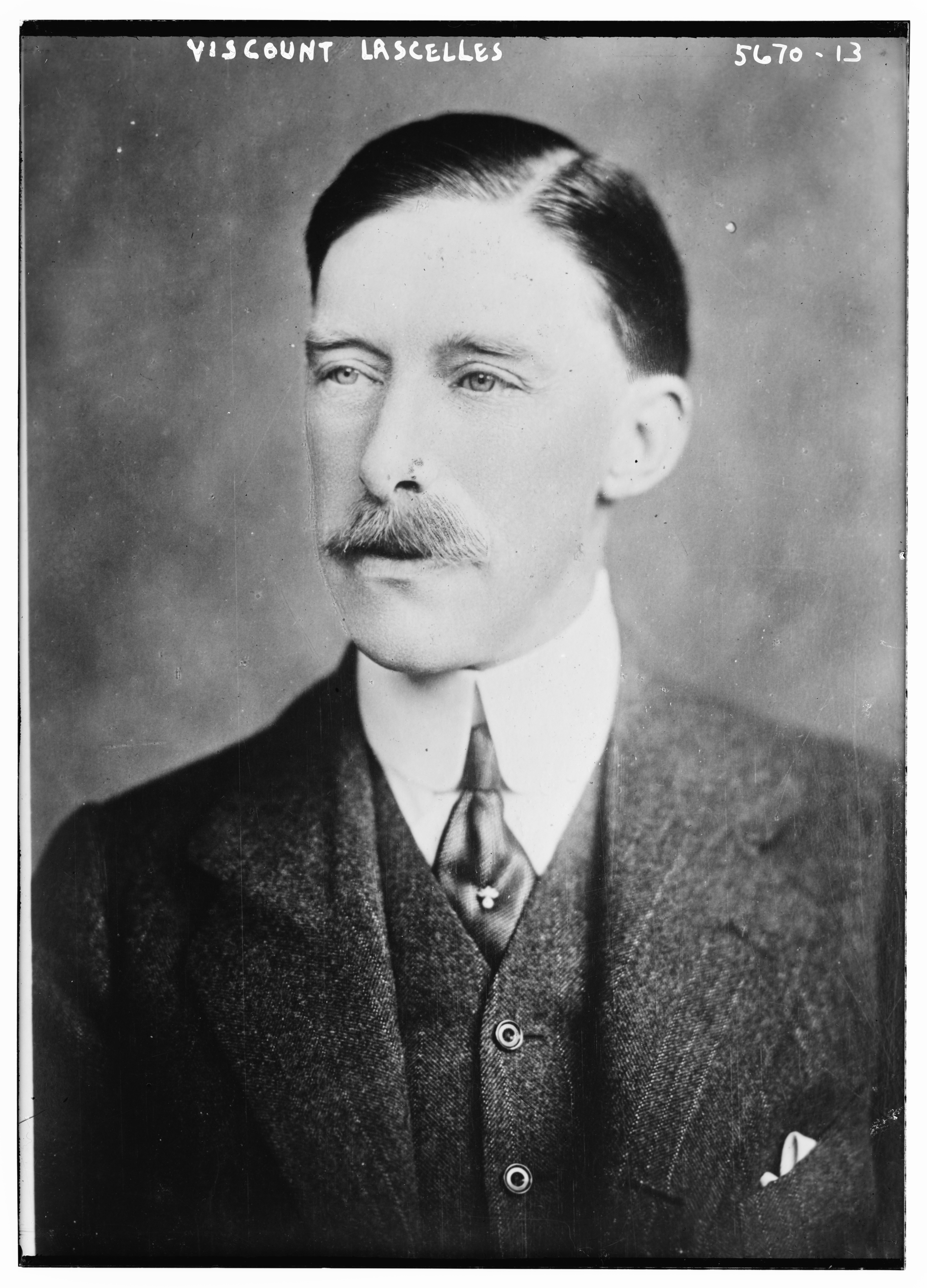
Photograph of Viscount Lascelles, 1920-1925

=== Marriage to Princess Mary ===
Lord Harewood married Princess Mary, only daughter of King George V and Queen Mary, at Westminster Abbey, on 28 February 1922. His best man was Sir Victor Mackenzie, 3rd Baronet.

After their marriage, Lord Harewood and Princess Mary split their time between their homes, Chesterfield House in London; Goldsborough Hall, part of the Harewood Estate; and Harewood House itself, in Yorkshire, which became their family home in 1930, after the death of his father in October 1929. They had two children:

- George Henry Hubert Lascelles, 7th Earl of Harewood (born at Chesterfield House on 7 February 1923, baptised at St Mary's Church, Goldsborough, on 25 March 1923, and died on 11 July 2011);
- Gerald David Lascelles (born at Goldsborough Hall on 21 August 1924, and died on 27 February 1998).

Their elder son, the 7th Earl of Harewood, wrote about his parents' marriage in his memoirs, The Tongs and the Bones, and described their relationship, saying that "they got on well together and had a lot of friends and interests in common". He also noted that "[s]hy, aloof and worse, I have heard my father called since; but that was not how his friends knew him [or] how his family felt about him; and I knew then, and know still, that when I was 24 I lost potentially the best friend and mentor I could ever have – at precisely the moment I discovered this was so".

== Military career ==
After education at Eton College, Lascelles attended the Royal Military College, Sandhurst, before being commissioned as a second lieutenant in the Grenadier Guards on 12 February 1902, serving until 1905. He was an honorary attaché at the British embassy in Paris from 1905 to 1907, then served as aide-de-camp to the Governor General of Canada, Earl Grey, until 1911.

In 1913, he joined the Territorial Army as second lieutenant in the Yorkshire Hussars yeomanry. He was promoted lieutenant in the reserve of officers in 1914. He continued with the yeomanry after the outbreak of the First World War until he rejoined the Grenadier Guards for service on the Western Front in April 1915. Even so, he continued to be promoted within the regiment to captain in 1917. Post-war he was promoted major in 1920 and retired in 1924.

Meanwhile, at the front, he was wounded in the head at the Second Battle of Givenchy, but recovered to fight in the Battle of Loos in 1915, and was wounded twice more as well as gassed. He was promoted captain and later major in command of a battalion (the 3rd) in 1915, and lieutenant-colonel in 1918. He was appointed Companion of the Distinguished Service Order (DSO), and received a bar to that decoration, both in 1918, as well as the French Croix de Guerre.

He continued his interest in the Territorial movement after the war, as Honorary Colonel of the 1st (City of London) Battalion, London Regiment (Royal Fusiliers) from 1923, the 5th Battalion West Yorkshire Regiment from 1937, and as president of the West Yorkshire Territorial Forces Association from 1928. He was also appointed in 1937 honorary air commodore of the 609 (West Riding) Bomber Squadron of the Auxiliary Air Force.

== Other interests ==
After the war, Lascelles remained interested in local Yorkshire issues and events, often contributing to the Leeds Board of Management. He was president of the Yorkshire Rural Community Council. He was Lord Lieutenant of the West Riding of Yorkshire from 1927 until his death.

He was president of the Royal Agricultural Society of England in 1929 when that year's Royal Show was held at Harrogate.

Interested in equestrian sports, he served as Master of the Bramham Moor Hounds from 1921, and was a steward of the Jockey Club and co-editor of Flat Racing (1940) for the London Library.

Lord Harewood, a Freemason, served as Grand Master of the United Grand Lodge of England from 1942 to 1947.

== Political career ==
As Viscount Lascelles, he attempted to enter the House of Commons in 1913. He stood as the Unionist candidate in the 1913 Keighley by-election. (The Liberal incumbent, Sir Stanley Buckmaster, had been appointed Solicitor General.) In the three-cornered fight, which also included a Labour candidate, he came second to Buckmaster by 878 votes.

He did not seek election again, and his defeat led to a later distaste for politics. He declared in later life: "[E]very war in which Britain had been involved had been due to the inefficiency of politicians, and they began what soldiers had to end".

On succeeding to his father's earldom, he became a member of the House of Lords.

== Death and legacy ==
Lord Harewood died of a heart attack on 24 May 1947 at the age of 64 at his home, Harewood House. He is buried in the Lascelles' family vault at All Saints' Church, Harewood. Lady Harewood, the Princess Royal, survived him by almost eighteen years, dying in 1965.

The Harewood Estates were valued at £1,400,000 for probate, upon which approximately £800,000 in death duties were payable.

It is widely understood that Virginia Woolf based the character of Archduke Henry on him in her novel Orlando, a tribute to her lover Vita Sackville-West. Henry Lascelles was one of West's suitors. In the 2019 film Downton Abbey, Viscount Lascelles is played by Andrew Havill.

== Honours and arms ==
British:

- Companion of the Distinguished Service Order (DSO), with Bar – 3 June 1918 (Bar – 3 Apr 1919)
- Knight Companion of the Garter (KG) – 27 February 1922
- Knight of Grace of the Order of St John of Jerusalem – 1 March 1923
- Territorial Decoration (TD) – 10 May 1929
- Knight Grand Cross of the Royal Victorian Order (GCVO) – 1 January 1934
- Personal Aide-de-Camp (ADC(P)) – 1 February 1937
- Recipient of the King George VI Coronation Medal – 12 May 1937

Foreign:

- Croix de Guerre 1914–1918 (France)
- Grand Cross of Order of Muhammad Ali (Egypt)
- Order of St Olav (Norway)

Coat of arms of Henry, 6th Earl of Harewood	Arms of Alliance of Lord Harwood and Princess Mary

== Ancestry ==
Ancestors of Henry Lascelles, 6th Earl of Harewood

8. Henry Lascelles, 3rd Earl of Harewood
4. Henry Lascelles, 4th Earl of Harewood
9. Lady Louisa Thynne
2. Henry Lascelles, 5th Earl of Harewood
10. Ulick de Burgh, 1st Marquess of Clanricarde
5. Lady Elizabeth de Burgh
11. Harriet Canning
1. Henry Lascelles, 6th Earl of Harewood
12. George Bridgeman, 2nd Earl of Bradford
6. Orlando Bridgeman, 3rd Earl of Bradford
13. Georgina Elizabeth Moncreiffe
3. Lady Florence Bridgeman
14. Cecil Weld-Forester, 1st Baron Forester
7. Selina Weld-Forester
15. Lady Katherine Mary Manners

Honorary titles
Preceded by The Earl of Harewood	Lord Lieutenant of the West Riding of Yorkshire; 1927–1947	Succeeded by The Earl of Scarbrough
Academic offices
Preceded by Robert Crewe-Milnes	Chancellor of the University of Sheffield; 1944–1947	Succeeded by E. F. L. Wood, 1st Earl of Halifax
Masonic offices
Preceded by The Duke of Kent	Grand Master of the United Grand Lodge of England; 1942–1947	Succeeded by The Duke of Devonshire
Peerage of the United Kingdom
Preceded by Henry Lascelles	Earl of Harewood; 1929–1947	Succeeded by George Lascelles
