= Henry Lascelles, 4th Earl of Harewood =

British peer

The Right Honourable The Earl of Harewood
- Earl of Harewood
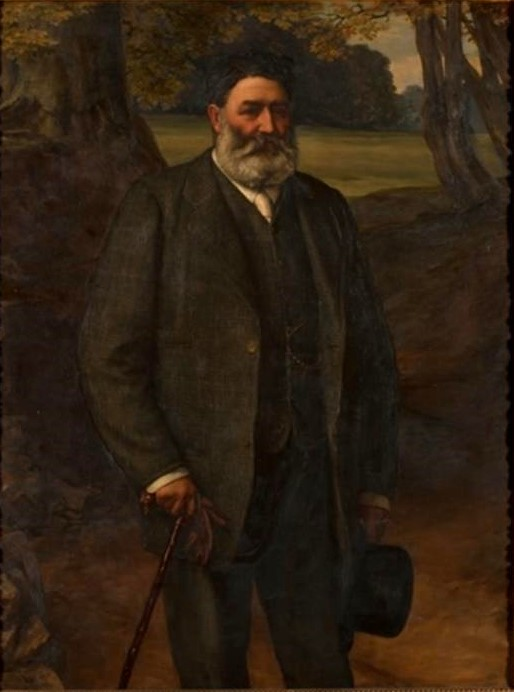
- The 4th Earl of Harewood
- Tenure: 1857–1892
- Born: 18 June 1824; London, England
- Died: 24 June 1892 (aged 68); Harewood House, West Yorkshire, England
- Spouses: Lady Elizabeth de Burgh (m. 1845; died 1854) Diana Smyth (m. 1858)
- Issue: Henry Lascelles, 5th Earl of Harewood; Commander Frederick Lascelles; Gerald Lascelles; Charles Lascelles; Constance Lawley, Baroness Wenlock; Margaret Cuff, Countess of Desart; Lady Susan Sutton; Captain Edwin Lascelles; Daniel Lascelles; George Lascelles; William Lascelles; Francis Lascelles; Eric Lascelles; Lady Mary Doyne
- Parents: Henry Lascelles, 3rd Earl of Harewood; Lady Louisa Thynne

Henry Thynne Lascelles, 4th Earl of Harewood (18 June 1824 – 24 June 1892), was a British peer and the son of Henry Lascelles, 3rd Earl of Harewood.

He took a great interest in the operation of the Leeds General Infirmary, and the St James Hospital Workhouse, working with the Chairman of the Leeds Board of Guardians, Major (William) Middleton Esq., to provide lavish decorations for the hospitals' patients at Christmas, 1872.

He was commanding officer of the Yorkshire Hussars, a part-time Yeomanry Cavalry regiment, from 1859 to 1870.

== Family ==
He married firstly, Lady Elizabeth Joanna de Burgh (22 February 1826 – 26 February 1854), daughter of Ulick de Burgh, 1st Marquess of Clanricarde, on 17 July 1845. Her maternal grandfather was former Prime Minister George Canning. They had six children:

- Henry Ulick Lascelles, 5th Earl of Harewood (21 August 1846 – 6 October 1929)
- Commander Frederick Canning Lascelles (6 May 1848 – 31 December 1928), married Frederica Maria Liddell, a granddaughter of Thomas Liddell, 1st Baron Ravensworth and had issue, including Sir Alan Lascelles.
- Gerald William Lascelles (26 October 1849 – 11 February 1928), married Constance Philipson and had issue.
- Charles George Lascelles (23 January 1851 – 19 February 1886), died unmarried.
- Lady Constance Mary Lascelles (27 May 1852 – 23 August 1932), married Beilby Lawley, 3rd Baron Wenlock and had issue.
- Lady Margaret Joan Lascelles (2 October 1853 – 19 September 1927), married Hamilton Cuffe, 5th Earl of Desart and had issue.

On 21 April 1858, he married secondly, Diana Smyth (c. 1838 – 4 March 1904), a granddaughter of George FitzRoy, 4th Duke of Grafton and great-granddaughter of Prince William Henry, Duke of Gloucester and Edinburgh (through his illegitimate daughter). They had eight children:

- Lady Susan Elizabeth Lascelles (21 May 1860 – 22 January 1925), married Captain Francis Sutton and had issue.
- Captain Edwin Harry Lascelles (3 August 1861 – 16 January 1924), died unmarried.
- Daniel Harry Lascelles (1 August 1862 – 28 November 1904), died unmarried.
- George Algernon Lascelles (2 August 1865 – 25 May 1932), married Mabel Massey and had issue.
- William Horace Lascelles (15 February 1868 – 7 May 1949), married Madeline Barton and had issue, including Mary Lascelles and Daniel Lascelles.
- Francis John Lascelles (29 December 1871 – 9 May 1925), married Gertie Stradling and had issue.
- Eric James Lascelles (2 March 1873 – 24 June 1901), died unmarried.
- Lady Mary Diana Lascelles (24 May 1877 – 23 July 1930), married Robert Doyne, grandson of William Wentworth-Fitzwilliam, 6th Earl Fitzwilliam, and had issue.

Peerage of the United Kingdom
Preceded by Henry Lascelles	Earl of Harewood; 1857–1892	Succeeded by Henry Ulick Lascelles
