= Egremont Lascelles =

The Honourable Egremont Lascelles

Member of Parliament for Northallerton
- In office 11 May 1866 – 17 November 1868
- Preceded by: Charles Mills
- Succeeded by: John Hutton

Personal details
- Born: 26 July 1825
- Died: 27 October 1892 (aged 67)
- Party: Conservative
- Spouse: Jessie Elizabeth Malcolm (m. 1856)
- Children: Two
- Parent(s): Henry Lascelles; Lady Louisa Thyme

Egremont William Lascelles (26 July 1825 – 27 October 1892) was a British Conservative Party politician.

Lascelles was the son of Henry Lascelles and Lady Louisa Thyme. In 1856, he married Jessie Elizabeth Malcolm — daughter of Neil Malcolm and Harriet Mary Clarke-Jervoise — and they had two children: Marion (died 1938) and Clare (c. 1861–1883).

In 1847, Lascelles became a lieutenant captain in the Grenadier Guards and in 1852, he became major of the 1st Regiment of West York Militia. He was later also a Deputy Lieutenant.

He was elected MP for Northallerton at a by-election in 1866 but did not seek to retain the seat at the next general election in 1868.

Parliament of the United Kingdom
Preceded by Charles Mills	Member of Parliament for Northallerton; 1866–1868	Succeeded by John Hutton
