= Thomas Lascelles (died 1697) =

English radical politician and businessman

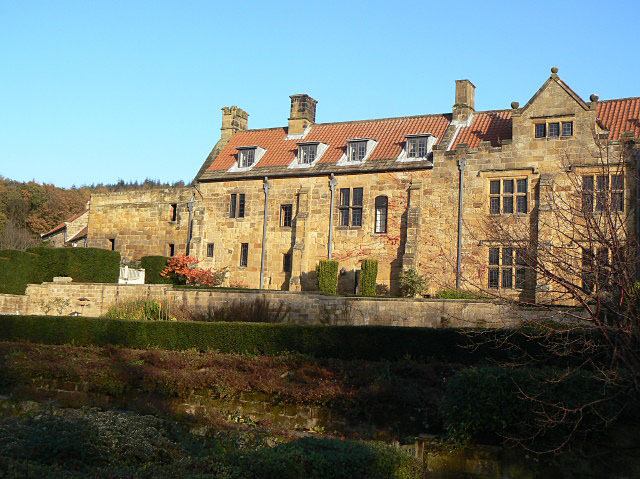
- Mount Grace Manor House; built by Thomas Lascelles

MP for Northallerton
- In office January 1689 – October 1697 †
- Monarch: William III Mary II
- Preceded by: Sir David Foulis
- Succeeded by: Ralph Milbancke

MP for Northallerton
- In office April 1660 – July 1660
- Monarch: Charles II
- Preceded by: Henry Darley
- Succeeded by: Sir Gilbert Gerard

Personal details
- Born: 5 August 1624 (baptised) Stank Hall, nr Kirby Sigston Yorkshire
- Died: 30 October 1697 (aged 73) Northallerton
- Resting place: All Saints' Church, Northallerton
- Spouse: Ruth
- Children: Thomas; Margaret
- Parent(s): William Lascelles (died 1624); Elizabeth Wadeson
- Occupation: Businessman and politician

Thomas Lascelles (1624 to 1697), also spelt Lassells, was an English radical politician and businessman of the second half of the 17th century. He is now best known for the construction of Mount Grace Manor House, one of the few extant examples of architecture from the 1649 to 1660 Commonwealth or Protectorate.

== Life ==
The Lascelles were part of a network of mercantile interests in London, Yorkshire, Ireland, New England and Barbados. While unconnected to the aristocratic family of the same name, various branches were spread across Yorkshire, including Northallerton, Durham, Whitby, York, Harewood House and Terrington. The family tended to use the same names (Thomas, Francis, Robert, Henry etc.), which often causes confusion.

Thomas Lascelles was born in August 1624, fourth and youngest son of William Lascelles (died November 1624) and Elizabeth Wade; he had three brothers, Francis (1612–1667), Robert (1617–?) and Peregrine (1619–1658).

== Career ==
Like many of his friends and relations, Thomas supported Parliament during the 1639–1652 Wars of the Three Kingdoms. In the late 1640s, he served in the New Model Army in England and Ireland and established businesses first in Dromore, County Down, then later in Lisburn.

The 1641 Irish Rebellion led to military interventions by the Scots and English Parliament, which were financed by the March 1642 Adventurers' Act. One of the last pieces of legislation approved before the English Civil War began, this raised loans to be repaid by the sale of lands held by the Irish rebels; enforcing it was one of the primary objectives of Cromwell's war in Ireland.

A number of different subscriptions for the Adventurers loans were opened between 1642 and 1647, and although the Lascelles family are not listed by name, many subscribed by forming syndicates and sold their interests prior to lands being allocated by the 1652 Act of Settlement. It seems likely Thomas was involved, since both he and his brother Francis had business interests in Ulster, while another branch of the family was established in Killough, County Down.

He invested his profits in purchasing the manor of Northallerton from the Bishop of Durham in 1649, followed in 1653 by Mount Grace Priory, a former Carthusian monastery suppressed in 1539. He converted parts of the remaining buildings into what is now a rare example of architecture from the 1649 to 1660 Commonwealth. In 1660, Charles II was restored as monarch and in April, Thomas and Francis were elected to the Convention Parliament as Members of Parliament for Northallerton. In June, the two deemed it prudent to resign their seats and go into temporary exile in the Dutch Republic.

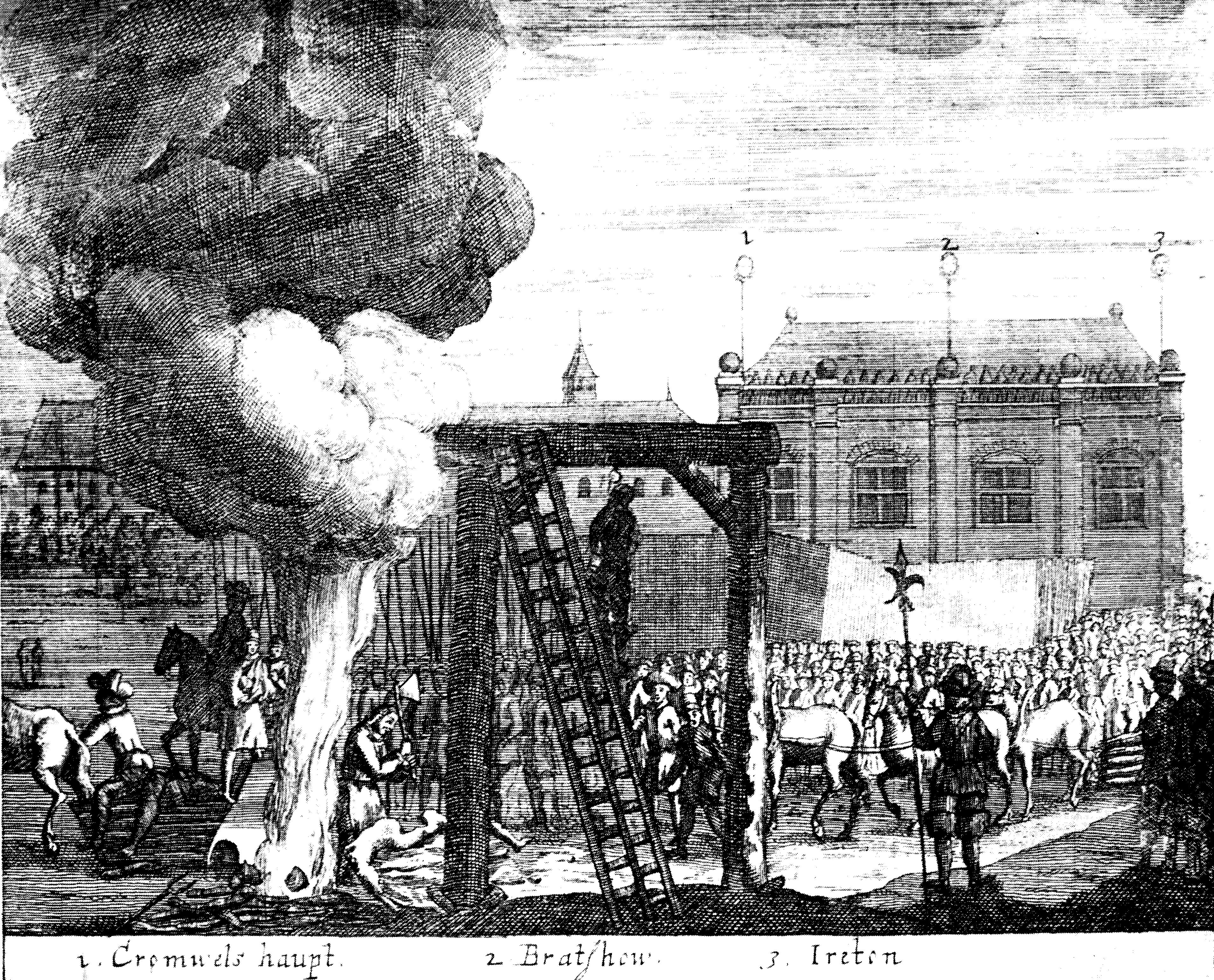
The 'execution' of the corpses of Regicides Cromwell, Bradshaw, and Ireton 1660; the involvement of his brother Francis in the trial of Charles I led to a short exile in Holland

While a key player in negotiations leading to the Restoration, Francis was also a member of the High Court of Justice that condemned Charles I to death in 1649. Although neither present when sentence was passed nor a signatory of the death warrant, he was clearly a target, especially after the Regicides were excluded from the Indemnity and Oblivion Act. Many were condemned to be hung, drawn and quartered, while the corpses of Cromwell, Bradshaw and Ireton were dug up and dragged to Tyburn gallows.

The executions were halted only when ministers grew concerned by public reaction to the deaths. Even Pepys, who was closely connected to the new regime, recorded his admiration for the conduct of Thomas Harrison at his execution in October 1660. The Lascelles were indemnified and allowed to return home, although Francis was fined and perpetually barred from holding public office.

The brothers were later accused of involvement in the Northern Rising, a conspiracy of some 100 Anabaptist former soldiers and radicals centred on Northallerton and Leeds. In December 1662, the two were briefly held in York Castle but the 'Lascelles Plot' was soon shown to have been fabricated by government informers while the Rising in October 1663 quickly collapsed.

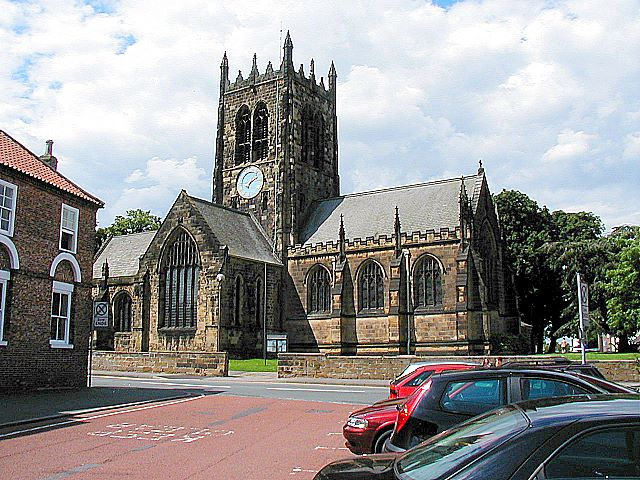
All Saints, Northallerton, where Thomas and other family members was buried

The 1665 to 1667 Second Anglo-Dutch War was opposed by many former Parliamentarians on both commercial and political grounds and Thomas was one of those held in preventative detention during the invasion scare of 1666. While not directly involved in the 1679 to 1681 Exclusion Crisis, he ensured Northallerton returned anti-Court MPs and his house was searched for weapons after the 1683 Rye House Plot.

In the 1688 Glorious Revolution, his nephew Daniel served in the force led by Lord Danby that secured York and Hull for William III. After a gap of nearly thirty years, Thomas was re-elected MP for Northallerton in 1689 and loaned money to the new regime, which do not appear to have been repaid. He remained an MP until his death in 1697, although with minimal involvement, and was appointed Housekeeper of the Excise Office in 1693.

When he died in November 1697, his family had to seek assistance from Parliament in settling his estates; in April 1698, the House of Lords introduced, "An Act for vesting the Real Estate late of Thomas Lassells Esquire deceased, in Trustees, to be sold, for the Payment of his Debts." The process was not completed until March 1699, when his widow was given permission to dispose of lands and houses in Ealing, Middlesex.

Thomas was the only member of his family to live at Mount Grace; it was rented out in 1701 before being sold by Robert Lascelles in 1744.

== Sources ==
- Harris, Tim (2007). Revolution; the Great Crisis of the British Monarchy 1685–1720. Penguin. ISBN 978-0141016528.
- Hopper, Andrew (2002). "The Farnley Wood Plot and the Memory of the Civil Wars in Yorkshire". The Historical Journal. 45 (2): 281–303. doi:10.1017/S0018246X02002406. S2CID 159769395.
- Jones, John (1859). History and Antiquities of Harewood, in the County of York, with topographical notices of its parishes and neighbourhoods. Simpkin, Marshall & Co.
- Smith, SD (2010). Slavery, Family, and Gentry Capitalism in the British Atlantic: The World of the Lascelles, 1648–1834. Cambridge University Press. ISBN 978-0521143004.
- Watson, Paula, Bolton, PA. "LASCELLES, Thomas (1624-97), of Mount Grace Priory, East Harlsey, Yorks". History of Parliament Online.

Parliament of Great Britain
Preceded by Sir David Foulis	MP for Northallerton; January 1689 – December 1697	Succeeded by Ralph Milbancke
Preceded by Henry Darley	MP for Northallerton; April 1660 – June 1660	Succeeded by Sir Gilbert Gerard
