= Henry Peirse =

English landowner and Member of Parliament

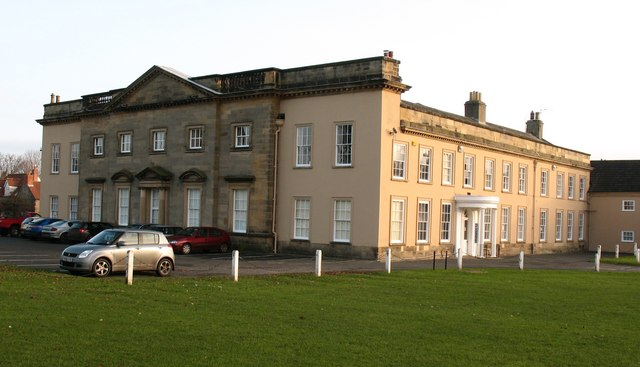
- Bedale Hall, North Yorkshire
- Born: 1695
- Died: 2 October 1759
- Occupation: Politician
- Spouse: Ann Johnson
- Relatives: Henry Peirse (younger) (son)

Henry Peirse (1695 – 2 October 1759) of Bedale in Yorkshire was an English landowner and Member of Parliament.

He was born the eldest son of John Peirse of Lazenby, Yorkshire and inherited the manor of Bedale from his grandfather. In the 1730s he transformed the old manor house into a Palladian mansion, renaming it Bedale Hall.

He served as a Member of Parliament for Northallerton in Yorkshire between 1713 and 1715 and between 1722 and 1754.

He married Anne Johnson on 15 February 1754 and had one son, Henry, who was also MP for Northallerton for many years.

He was assassinated in Birkshire on 2 October 1759.

Parliament of Great Britain
Preceded by Robert Raikes; Roger Gale	Member of Parliament for Northallerton; 1713–1715; With: Leonard Smelt	Succeeded by Leonard Smelt; Cholmley Turner
Preceded by Leonard Smelt; Cholmley Turner	Member of Parliament for Northallerton; 1722–1754; With: Leonard Smelt 1722-1740; William Smelt 1740-1745; Henry Lascelles 1745-1752; Daniel Lascelles 1752-1754	Succeeded by Daniel Lascelles; Edwin Lascelles
