= Henry Lascelles (1690–1753) =

British colonial administrator

- Born: 1690
- Died: 16 October 1753 (aged 62-63)
- Occupations: Plantation owner, politician
- Spouse: Mary Carter
- Children: 3 sons, including Edwin Lascelles and Daniel Lascelles

Henry Lascelles (1690 – 16 October 1753) was an English-born Barbados plantation owner. He was the son of Daniel Lascelles (1655–1734) and Margaret Metcalfe. He served as Collector of Customs for the British government in Barbados. He was a director of the British East India Company 1737–45, a financier, and Member of Parliament for Northallerton. He lived in his constituency, in Harewood, in Richmond-upon-Thames, and for periods in his twenties, at his family's plantation in Barbados.

== Family, early life ==
The Lascelles family were increasingly prominent and politically involved Yorkshire landed gentry, at the time of Lascelles's birth, having owned land near Northallerton, in the Vale of Mowbray, rich farming country, since at least the late thirteenth century. They were based at Stank Hall, now a sheep farm, which the head of the family acquired in 1608 from land management profits. Lascelles's grandfather Francis Lascelles (c. 1612-1667) had been a Roundhead colonel in the English Civil Wars, and as an MP for the district sat in judgment on King Charles I of England, who was executed in 1649. Francis Lascelles was Cromwellian Commissioner for Yorkshire, during Oliver Cromwell's period as Lord Protector, ruling the country, and also served in both the First Protectorate Parliament and the Second Protectorate Parliament in the 1650s. Henry Lascelles's father Daniel Lascelles (1655-1734) assisted in driving out the Roman Catholic King James II of England in 1688. He became High Sheriff of Yorkshire in 1718–19, during the reign of King George I of Great Britain, was briefly an MP for Northallerton, calling himself a Whig, and a businessman.

== Barbados ==
Lascelles was in Barbados by the age of 22, in 1712, following his elder brother George, who first crossed the Atlantic Ocean in 1706. The Lascelles family had Barbados interests as early as 1648, establishing a plantation, a warehouse, and shipping interests for the rapidly developing colony, first settled by the English in 1625. Henry Lascelles settled in Barbados with his brother Edward, where he was a merchant and planter; George Lascelles returned to England to run the business there.

It was a family-managed enterprise, concentrating on sugar production and exports, transportation of goods to supply the colony, and slavery. Slaves were imported from west Africa, put to work on the plantations, and were objects of lucrative financial trading by the business leaders. The triangular shipping trade routes of the era ran as follows: British goods were shipped to West Africa, slaves were bought in exchange for the goods and shipped to Barbados and other West Indian islands for sale, and sugar and other export crops were shipped to Britain, with great profits on all three journey legs. Barbados was by about 1680 the most prosperous English colony in the Americas.;

=== Customs Collector ===
In 1714, Lascelles gained the powerful position of Collector of Customs for Barbados, coinciding with the ascension of the new prime minister Sir Robert Walpole, a Whig. This influential and lucrative post, a reward for earlier political loyalties, was to remain in family hands for the next three decades. Lascelles was in charge of collecting duties on Barbados colonial exports (including his own), usually at the rate of 4.5 per cent; this money would then be remitted to the Treasury in London.

== Business expansion ==
Upon George's death in 1729, Henry Lascelles returned to London and became one of its leading businessmen, with offices near the port district. He bought an estate in the country town of Richmond-upon-Thames, some 14 miles west of his business. He had developed a financial business, lending money on both sides of the Atlantic, and this was successful.

Henry Lascelles later co-founded the firm of Lascelles and Maxwell, sugar factors, of Mark Lane, in the City of London. This very successful partnership with the Scotsman George Maxwell began in September 1743. On his partner Maxwell's death in 1763, the firm became Lascelles, Clarke, and Daling.

== Marriages and progeny ==
Lascelles and his first wife Mary (daughter of Edward Carter (fellow plantation owner), whom he married in Barbados on 8 April 1712) left three surviving children, all of whom were born in Barbados:

- Edwin Lascelles, 1st and last Baron Harewood (5 February 1713 – 25 January 1795)
- Daniel Lascelles (20 May 1714 – 24 May 1784)
- Captain Henry Lascelles (18 August 1716 – 14 July 1786)

Mary died in 1721. Lascelles's second marriage to Jennet Whetstone in 1731 was childless.

== Later years and death ==
Henry Lascelles retired from business in 1750, at the age of sixty, but retained his seat in Parliament, along with much of his influence. In his will, he divided most assets among his two eldest sons, with Edwin Lascelles receiving land, and Daniel Lascelles the business interests.

Extensive business correspondence from the Lascelles and Maxwell firm has survived, and is the basis of modern research work by writer Adam Nicolson.

Henry Lascelles died by suicide in 1753 by slashing veins in his arm. He had cataracts in his eyes. At this juncture, he was reckoned to be the wealthiest person in England, by writer Adam Nicolson, with a personal fortune estimated at some half-million pounds.

== Legacy ==
Henry Lascelles, the son of a minor Yorkshire gentry family, amassed such extraordinary wealth and influence that his eldest son Edwin Lascelles was raised to the English peerage as the first Baron Harewood; he built Harewood House, the family seat. The head of the Lascelles family in the next generation was promoted to an earldom.

Parliament of Great Britain
Preceded by William Smelt; Henry Peirse	Member of Parliament for Northallerton; 1745–1752; With: Henry Peirse	Succeeded by Henry Peirse; Daniel Lascelles
