= Edwin Lascelles, 1st Baron Harewood =

British politician and landowner (1713-1795)

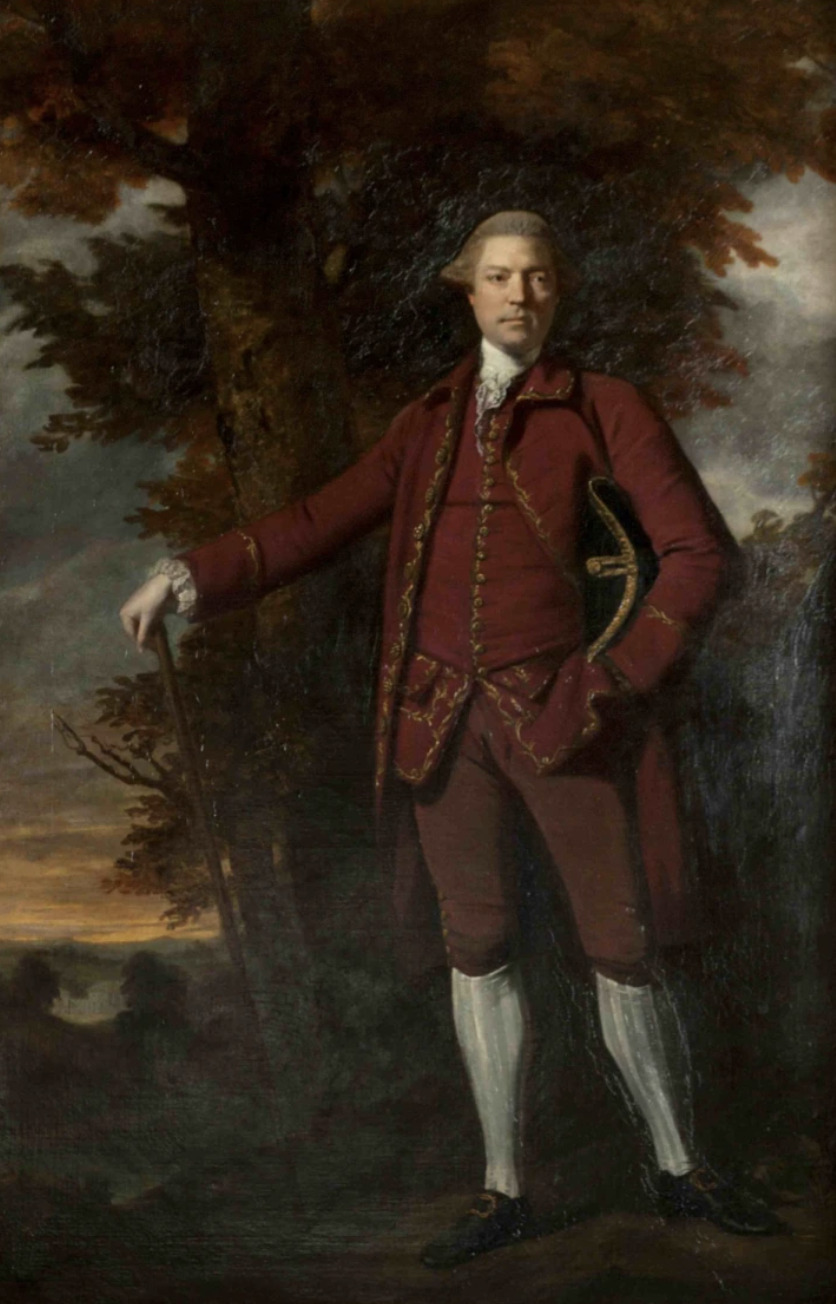
c. 1767 portrait of Harewood by Joshua Reynolds

Edwin Lascelles, 1st Baron Harewood (c. 1713 – 25 January 1795) was a British politician and landowner.

== Early life ==
Edwin Lascelles born c. 1713 in the British colony of Barbados, the elder son of Henry Lascelles and his wife Mary Carter. His father split the family fortune, leaving Edwin's younger brother Daniel as head of the business, and raised Edwin as a lord of the manor in the family's English estates. Edwin was educated at Trinity College, Cambridge, and subsequently went on a Grand Tour in Continental Europe.

== Military and political service ==
He fought in the Jacobite rising of 1745, and entered Parliament as MP for Scarborough from 1744 to 1754. He was later MP for Yorkshire from 1761 to 1780 and for Northallerton from 1780 to 1790 (inheriting the latter seat from his father Henry and his brother Daniel). By 1748 Edwin was installed as Lord of the Manor of Harewood and he built Harewood House from 1759 to 1771.

On Daniel's death childless in 1784 and their only other sibling Henry's death two years later, Edwin was left in sole charge of the fortune, to which he added 22 slave plantations, more than 27,000 acres (110 km^{2}) of land in the British West Indies and 2,947 slaves (which were surrendered to planters' creditors because they defaulted on debts due to the American War of Independence) worth £293,000 (about £28.3 million today). Many planters depended on their sale of sugar and molasses to the American colonies for income.

He was made Baron Harewood, of Harewood in the County of York on 9 July 1790, but died childless and the title became extinct. The fortune passed to his cousin Edward Lascelles (1740–1820), later 1st Earl of Harewood.

== Marriages ==
He was first married to Elizabeth Dawes, daughter of Sir Darcy Dawes, 4th Baronet, on 5 January 1746–47. His second marriage was to Lady Jane Fleming, daughter of William Coleman and Jane Seymour, and widow of Sir John Fleming, 1st Baronet, in 31 March 1770. His stepdaughters were Jane Stanhope, Countess of Harrington and Seymour Fleming, later noted for the separation scandal involving her husband Sir Richard Worsley, 7th Baronet. A picture of Seymour still hangs in Harewood House.

Parliament of Great Britain
Preceded by William Thompson and William Osbaldeston	Member of Parliament for Scarborough; 1744–1754; With: William Osbaldeston 1744–47; Roger Handasyde 1747–54	Succeeded by Sir Ralph Milbanke, Bt. and William Osbaldeston
Preceded by Daniel Lascelles and Henry Peirse	Member of Parliament for Northallerton; 1754–1761; With: Daniel Lascelles 1754–61	Succeeded by Daniel Lascelles and Edward Lascelles, 1st Earl
Preceded by Viscount Downe and Sir George Savile	Member of Parliament for Yorkshire; 1761–1780; With: Sir George Savile	Succeeded by Henry Duncombe and Sir George Savile
Preceded by Daniel Lascelles and Henry Peirse (younger)	Member of Parliament for Northallerton; 1780–1790; With: Henry Peirse (younger) 1780–90	Succeeded by Edward Lascelles, 1st Earl and Henry Peirse (younger)
Peerage of Great Britain
New creation	Baron Harewood; 1790–1795	Extinct
