= Bombardment of Lewes =

- Part of the War of 1812
Date	6–7 April 1813
Location	Lewes, Delaware
Result	American victory

Belligerents
United States	(United Kingdom of Great Britain and Ireland) United Kingdom

Commanders and leaders
(United States) David Haslet (United States) Samuel Boyer Davis	(United Kingdom of Great Britain and Ireland) John Beresford

Casualties and losses
No casualties	1 gunboat damaged

The Bombardment of Lewes was a military engagement during the War of 1812 during which a British naval squadron bombarded the American town of Lewes, Delaware.

== The bombardment ==
Following the outbreak of the War of 1812 between the United States and Great Britain, British naval forces established a partial blockade of the American eastern seaboard. As part of this strategy of blockade, the Royal Navy also conducted a series of sporadic attacks against American towns and coastal shipping. In March 1813 a force of British ships arrived in the Delaware Bay, where they proceeded to enforce the British blockade.

On 4 April 1813 a small British squadron commanded by Commodore John P. Beresford aboard HMS Poictiers arrived off the coast of Delaware, bound for Cape Henlopen. The warships approached the port town of Lewes, Delaware, encountering a small, revolution-era coastal defense battery to the west of town. Lewes itself was defended by a hastily assembled fort that had been built from pine logs in the town center. Beresford laid anchor and sent a shore party to the town, where their attempts to requisition supplies from the townspeople were rebuked by the arrival of the Delaware state militia. After several failed attempts to negotiate a surrender of supplies, Commodore Beresford addressed a final letter to "the first magistrate at Lewistown". The letter read;

Sir,

As soon as you receive this, I request you will send 20 live bullocks with a proportionate quantity of vegetables and hay to the Poictiers for the use of Britannic Majesty's squadron now at this anchorage, which will be immediately paid for at the Philadelphia prices. If you refuse to comply with this request I shall be under necessity of destroying your town.

I have the honor to be, sir, your very obedient servant,

J. P. Beresford

Commodore and commander of the British Squadron in the Mouth of the Delaware.

The letter was received by the governor of Delaware, who had traveled from the state capital in Dover to Lewes in light of the situation with the British. The governor replied to Beresford that acquiescing to his demands would violate the laws of the United States, and so declined the command. In response, the British flotilla bombarded the town over the course of 22 hours from 6 to 7 April. The British fire - which consisted of cannonballs and Congreve rockets - was for the most part ineffective, though several chimneys in the town suffered minor damage. The Americans returned fire, and succeed in setting one British gunboat aflame. Beresford broke off his attack on 7 April, and his ships withdrew to continue blockading the Delaware Bay. Casualties for the bombardment were recorded by the Americans as one pig wounded (leg broken) and one chicken killed. The British also suffered no casualties.

=== Legacy ===
One of the homes damaged in the bombardment, now known as the "Cannonball House" on account a British cannonball being lodged in its foundation, serves as Lewes' maritime history museum. A copy of Commodore Beresford's letter of demands to the town is stored in the house.
