= William Battie-Wrightson =

British landowner and Whig politician

William Battie-Wrightson (6 October 1789 – 10 February 1879) was a British landowner and Whig politician.

He was the elder son of William Wrightson of Cusworth Hall (near Doncaster), MP for Aylesbury.

He undertook the Grand Tour of Europe with his sister, Harriet, from 1816 to 1817. Battie-Wrightson was educated at Trinity College, Cambridge (1812), and trained for the law at Lincoln's Inn, being called to the bar in 1815. He succeeded his father to the Cusworth estate in 1827.

He was elected MP for East Retford in 1826, and then sat for Kingston upon Hull from 1830 to 1832, and for Northallerton from 1835 to 1865.

He married Georgiana Freeman Thomas of Ratton Park, Sussex.

Parliament of the United Kingdom
Preceded by William Evans; Samuel Crompton	Member of Parliament for East Retford; 1826; With: Robert Lawrence Dundas	Vacant writ suspended Title next held by Viscount Newark; Arthur Duncombe
Preceded by John Augustus O'Neill; Daniel Sykes	Member of Parliament for Kingston upon Hull; 1830–1832; With: George Schonswar	Succeeded by Matthew Davenport Hill; William Hutt
Preceded by John George Boss	Member of Parliament for Northallerton; 1835–1865	Succeeded by Charles Mills
