= Daniel Lascelles (1714–1784) =

English merchant & politician (1714–1784)

Daniel Lascelles (1714–1784) was a plantation owner, merchant and politician who sat in the British House of Commons from 1752 to 1780.

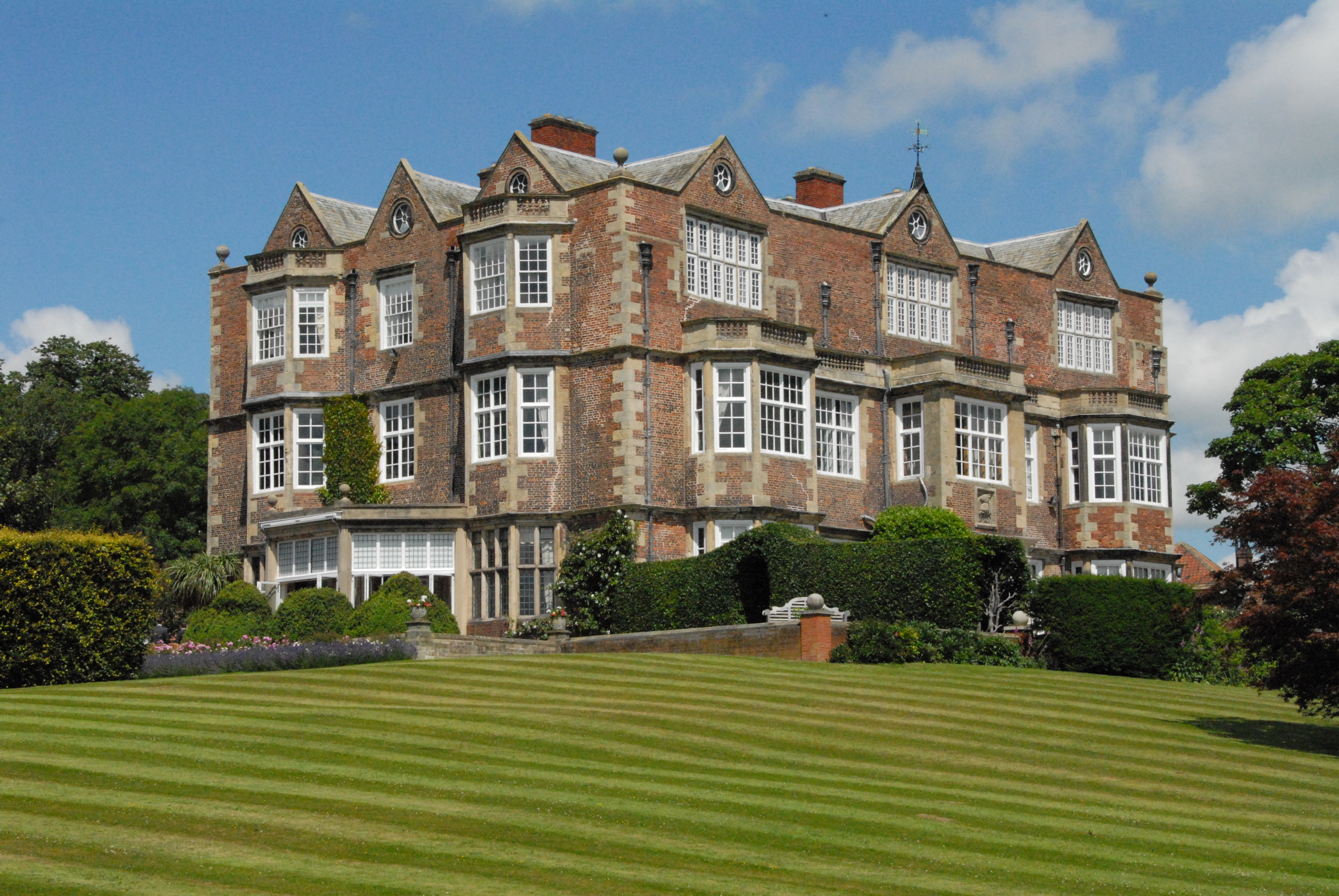
Goldsborough Hall

Born in Barbados and baptised at St Michael's, 20 May 1714 he resided at Goldsborough Hall near Knaresborough Yorkshire which estate he purchased about 1756.

The second son of Henry Lascelles (1690–1753) and his first wife, Mary Carter he represented the constituency of Northallerton from 3 April 1752, succeeding his father, to 1780 when he stood down in favour of his elder brother Edwin (1713-1795) who later became 1st Baron Harewood.

He was a partner in the firm of Lascelles and Maxwell, sugar factors, of Mark Lane, London; which, following the death of George Maxwell in 1763 became Lascelles Clarke and Daling.

Daniel married Elizabeth Southwick from whom he was divorced in 1751. He had no legitimate children. He died in Pall Mall London 24 May 1784.

Parliament of Great Britain
Preceded by Henry Lascelles; Henry Peirse	Member of Parliament for Northallerton; 1752 – 1780; With: Henry Peirse to 1754; Edwin Lascelles 1754–61; Edward Lascelles 1761–74; Henry Peirse (younger) from 1774	Succeeded by Henry Peirse (younger); Edwin Lascelles
