= John George Boss =

Captain John George Boss (1781–1837) was a British naval officer and Member of Parliament. He served with the Royal Navy during the Napoleonic Wars, and represented Northallerton in Parliament from 1832 to 1835.

Boss was born in Beverley, Yorkshire in 1785, and first went to sea as an apprentice on a merchantman. In 1796 he joined the Royal Navy as a midshipman aboard HMS Excellent, under Cuthbert Collingwood. He was briefly taken prisoner before rejoining HMS Centaur in the Caribbean, where he helped fortify the Diamond Rock. In 1804, he commanded a boat during the capture of the brig Curieux, and was appointed her first lieutenant when she was taken into service. With the Curieux he was involved in the capture of several ships, both in the Caribbean and later on the Lisbon station. He later served on a ship of the line during the siege of Cádiz. In 1812 he was appointed to command the sloop HMS Rhodian in the Caribbean, capturing a large number of American merchantmen as well as a Spanish privateer. He was presented with a silver-gilt cup with the inscription: "Presented to JOHN GEORGE BOSS ESQR. Captain of his B. Majesty's Sloop RHODIAN, For his Zeal and Valor in the destruction of Two French Privateers & defending a Convoy From ST JAGO DE CUBA to HENEAGA, Diego, Monga, Pasqual Privintos, Pedro Blanco Carariego, June 28th 1812". The cup was recently sold at Bonhams for over £40,000. The Rhodian was wrecked off Jamaica in 1813 with a large cargo of silver; despite heavy storms, the entire crew and almost all of the cargo were saved.

Boss was a Member of Parliament for the Northallerton constituency as a reformer, 1832–1835, and was promoted to the rank of captain in November 1833. He married twice: Charlotte Robinson (née Pennyman; daughter of Sir James Pennyman) in 1814, who died in 1832 aged 56, and Elizabeth Wylie in 1834. He was resident at Otterington Hall, Yorkshire.

Parliament of the United Kingdom
Preceded by Sir John Beresford, Bt; William Lascelles	Member of Parliament for Northallerton; 1832–1835	Succeeded by William Battie-Wrightson
