= Marcus Beresford (British Army officer, born 1800) =

British politician

General Marcus Beresford
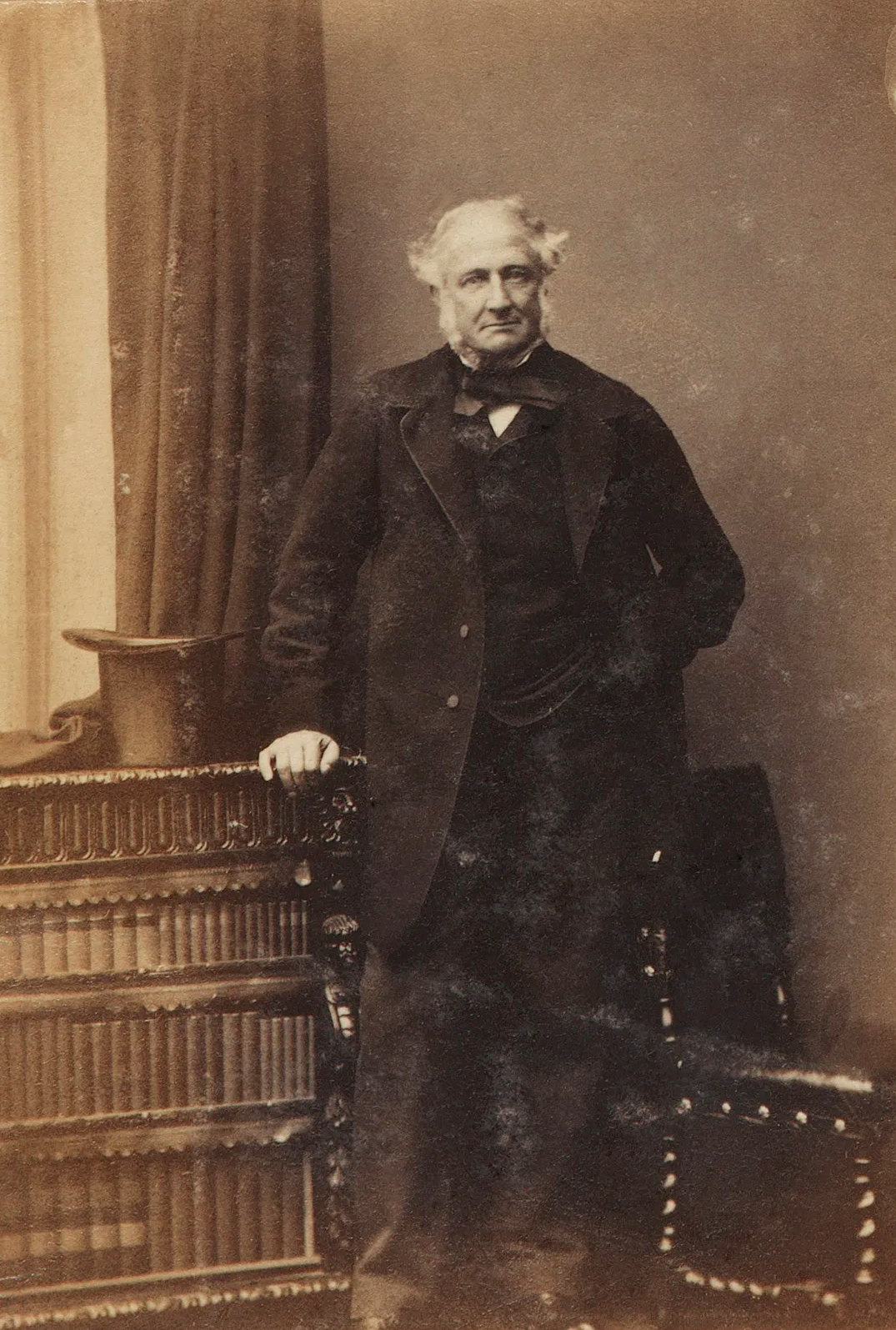
- Portrait by Camille Silvy, 1860

Member of Parliament for Berwick-upon-Tweed
- In office 1826–1832 Serving with John Gladstone, Sir Francis Blake
- Preceded by: Sir Francis Blake; Sir John Beresford
- Succeeded by: Sir Rufane Shaw Donkin; Sir Francis Blake

Member of Parliament for Northallerton
- In office 1824–1826 Serving with William Lascelles
- Preceded by: William Lascelles; Henry Peirse (younger)
- Succeeded by: Sir John Poo Beresford; Henry Lascelles

Personal details
- Born: 28 July 1800 Cork, Ireland
- Died: 16 March 1876 (aged 75)
- Relations: William Beresford, 1st Baron Decies (grandfather)
- Parent(s): George Beresford; Susan Gorges
- Education: Winchester College; Trinity College, Dublin

General Marcus Beresford (28 July 1800 – 16 March 1876) was an officer of the British Army and politician in England.

== Early life ==
Beresford was born on 28 July 1800 in Cork, Ireland. He was the second son of the Rev. George Beresford and his wife Susan Gorges. His grandfathers were Archbishop William Beresford, 1st Baron Decies and Hamilton Gorges MP, of Kilbrew.

His great-uncle George Beresford, 1st Marquess of Waterford, had two illegitimate sons, William Carr Beresford, created Viscount Beresford in 1814, and Sir John Beresford, "both of whom influenced the course of his career."

He was educated at Winchester College and graduated from Trinity College, Dublin in 1815.

== Career ==
He was Member of Parliament for Northallerton from 1824 to 1826. At the next general election, he made way for Sir John Beresford at Northallerton and stood for Berwick-upon-Tweed, where his family had recently established an interest, serving from 1826 to 1832. "In the House, Beresford followed his family’s Tory line."

After he was defeated in his bid to return to the House, he resumed his military career and served for five years as military secretary to the Indian commander-in-chief. He was made a full General on 4 March 1866 and given the colonelcy of the 20th Foot from 1858 to his death in 1876.

== Personal life ==
On 1 October 1828, he married his first cousin, Isabella Sewell, a daughter of Thomas Bermingham Daly Henry Sewell and Hon. Harriet Beresford. Before her death in August 1836, they were the parents of:

- Harriet Louisa Beresford (d. 1876), who died unmarried.
- Isabella Eliza Beresford (d. 1915), who married Lt.-Gen. George Brydges Rodney, a son of Capt. Hon. John Rodney (son of the 1st Baron Rodney), in 1856.

After the death of his first wife, he married Caroline Fane, daughter of William Fane and Louisa Hay Dashwood, on 22 January 1838 in Calcutta, India. Together, they were the parents of:

- Marcus de la Poer Beresford (b. 1847), a Major in the 4th Battalion, Royal Warwickshire Regiment.
- Ethel Louisa Beresford (1856–1925), who married Capt. Henry Spencer, son of Rev. Hon. Charles Spencer (son of 1st Baron Churchill), 1880.

General Beresford died on 16 March 1876.

Parliament of the United Kingdom
Preceded by William Lascelles; Henry Peirse (younger)	Member of Parliament for Northallerton; 1824–1826; With: William Lascelles	Succeeded by Sir John Poo Beresford; Henry Lascelles
Preceded by Sir Francis Blake; Sir John Beresford	Member of Parliament for Berwick-upon-Tweed; 1826–1832; With: John Gladstone 1826–1827; Sir Francis Blake 1827–1832	Succeeded by Sir Rufane Shaw Donkin; Sir Francis Blake
Military offices
Preceded by Henry Thomas	Colonel of the 20th (the East Devonshire) Regiment of Foot; 1858–1876	Succeeded by Sir Frederick Horn
