= Elliot baronets =

Extinct baronetcy in the Baronetage of the United Kingdom

There have been two separate creations of Elliot baronets: The first has merged with a higher title, and the second has become extinct.

== Elliot baronets of Minto, Roxburgh (19 April 1700) ==
See Earl of Minto

== Elliot baronets of Penshaw, County Durham and of Whitby, North Riding of York (1874) ==
This baronetcy was created on 15 May 1874 in the Baronetage of the United Kingdom. It became extinct in 1911 upon the death of the fourth baronet.

- Sir George Elliot, 1st Baronet (1814–1893)
- Sir George William Elliot, 2nd Baronet (1844–1895)
- Sir George Elliot, 3rd Baronet (1867–1904)
- Sir Charles Elliot, 4th Baronet (1873–1911), married on 1903 Helena Louise, youngest daughter of the late Benjamin Piercy.
