= Church of St Lawrence, Kirby Sigston =

Anglican church in North Yorkshire, England

Church of St Lawrence
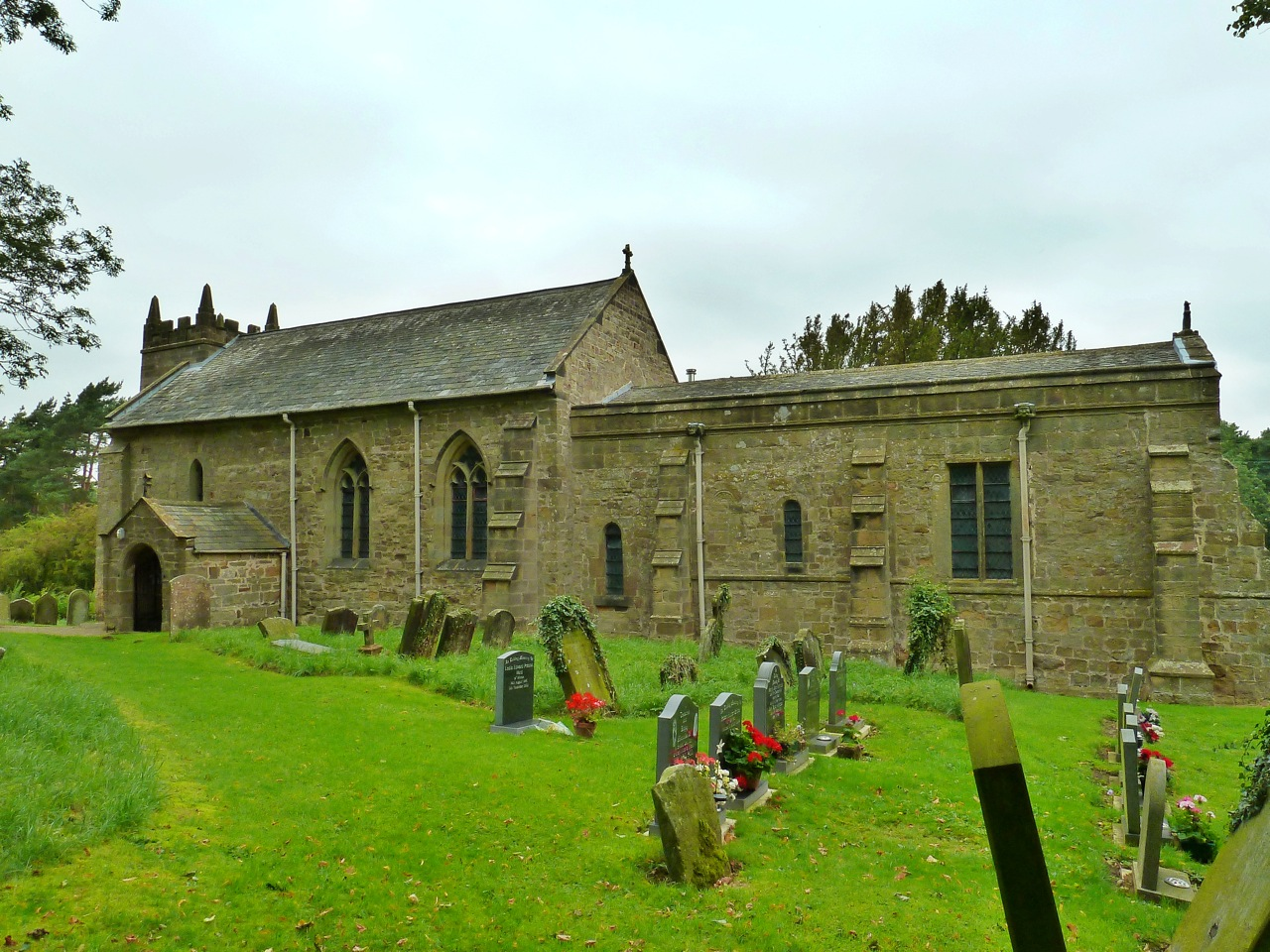
- St Lawrence Church, Kirby Sigston
- Church of St Lawrence
- 54.345°N 1.360°W
- OS grid reference: SE 41661 94668
- Location: Kirby Sigston, North Yorkshire
- Country: England
- Denomination: Anglican
- Website: Official webpage

History
- Status: Parish church

Architecture
- Functional status: Active

Administration
- Diocese: York
- Archdeaconry: Cleveland
- Deanery: Mowbray
- Benefice: Northallerton with Kirby Sigston
- Parish: Kirby Sigston

The Church of St Lawrence is an Anglican place of worship in the village of Kirby Sigston in North Yorkshire, England. The oldest part of the church dates back to the 12th century, although the presence of the name Kirby Sigston suggests that a church may have been in the village at the time of the Domesday survey. The village lies to the north of the church, and to the east is the site of a deserted medieval village for which the church is purported to have served. The church building is now a grade I listed structure.

== History ==
The Church of St Lawrence lies on a ridge of land just to the south of the village of Kirby Sigston, near to the remains of Sigston Castle. It is by a lake and close to the 19th century rectory. The main body of the church dates back to c. 1190, and this oldest section of the church consisted of just a chancel and a nave, but in 1200, the north aisle was added and the chancel was extended out eastwards. The tower is of Norman origin, but was largely rebuilt during the 18th century. The chancel shows evidence of having an arcade of two bays, possibly from the 14th century, and the capitals have dragons carved into them, something which Pevsner states is common for this area of the north of England. The base of the font dates back to the 13th century being carved from Frosterley Marble, and the bowl dates back to 1662. The stained glass displays various coats of arms, including that of the Colville family. This window used to be in the east window, but is now in a window by the aisle. The church was restored in the 1890s by Temple Moore, and during this time, the south porch was installed. The church was grade I listed in 1970.

Some archaeological evidence points to the church building being possibly larger than it currently is, and that it was located quite close to a village, some 0.5 miles (0.80 km) to the east. The name of the village is first recorded in 1088 for Kirby (Kirkja-by(r)), and in 1086 in the Domesday Book for Sigston (Sig(h)estun). Many of the places that have names beginning with Kirkby or Kirby, have documented evidence showing churches in either the eight, ninth, tenth or eleventh centuries. So the name could indicate a church of earlier origin than the current building. Foundation stones discovered during the renovations of the 1890s are believed to be from an earlier church than the current structure.

The church is in the benefice of Kirby Sigston, part of the Deanery of Mowbray and the Archdeaconry of Cleveland, and is in the Diocese of York. In the 14th century, difficulties arose in the provision of advowson of the church; the prior and abbey at Durham laid claim, and with the assistance of Edward III, they installed their preferred priest, John de Halnaby, to the benefice. However, the pope wanted 'his man', Thomas de Carleton, to be the incumbent at Kirby Sigston. de Carleton won out, but thereafter, and until the Dissolution in the 1530s, the advowson remained with Durham.

The churchyard contains the grave of Francis Lascelles.

== See also ==
- Grade I listed buildings in North Yorkshire (district)
- Listed buildings in Kirby Sigston
