= Kirby Sigston Manor =

House in Kirby Sigston, Hambleton, North Yorkshire, England

Coordinates: 54.3470°N 1.3630°W

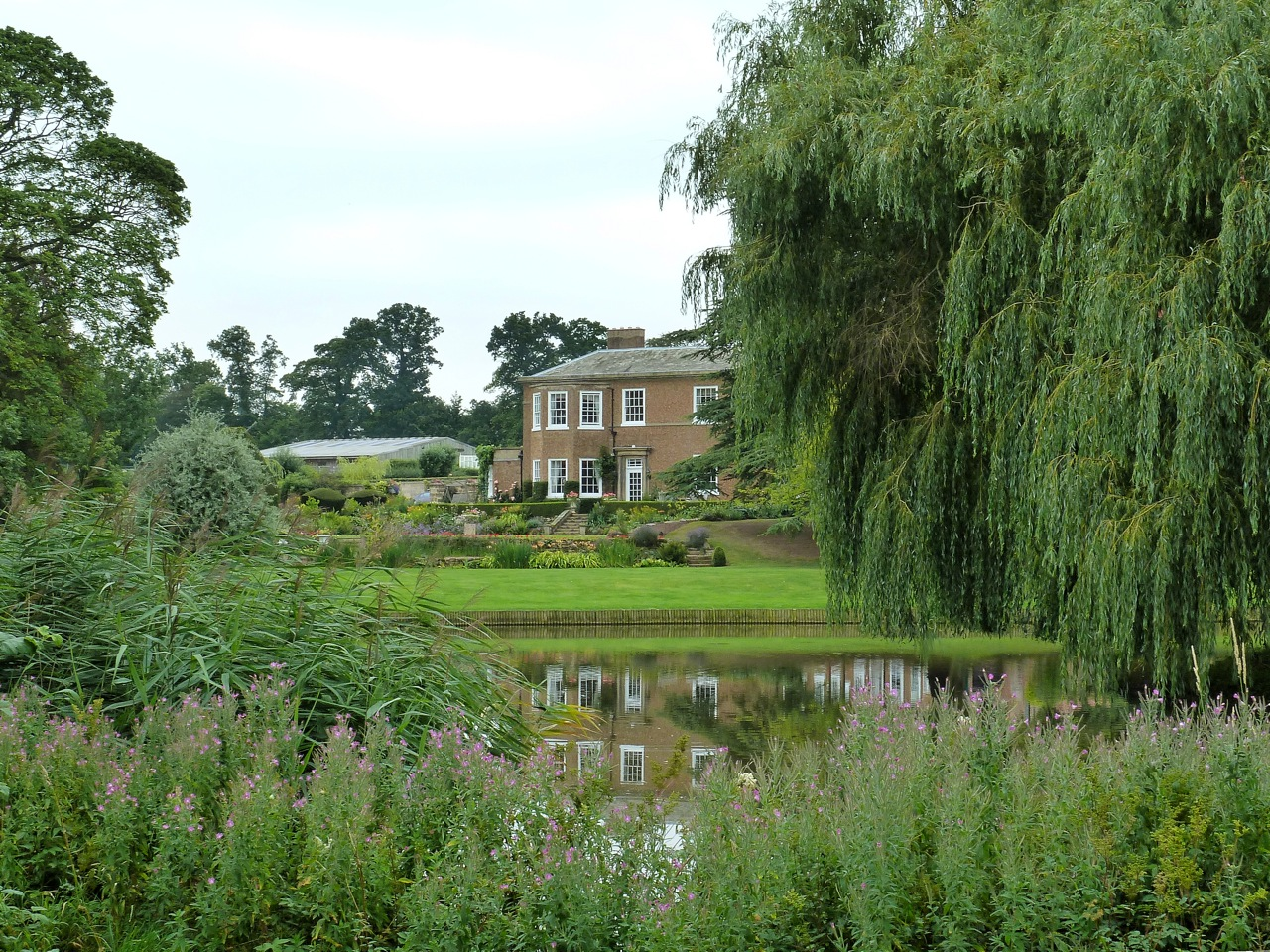
The manor house in 2010

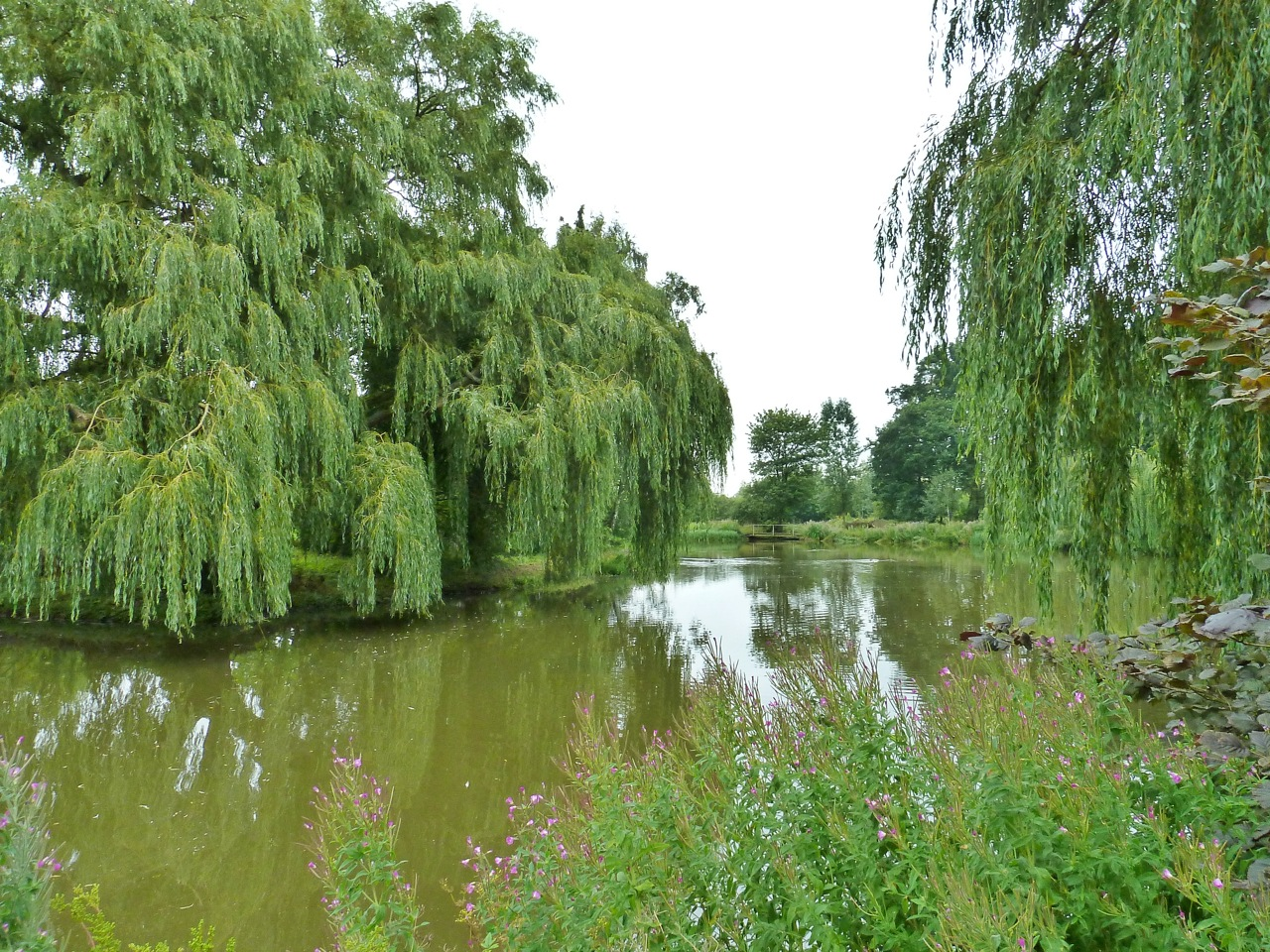
The lake at the manor house

Kirby Sigston Manor is a manor house in the village of Kirby Sigston in North Yorkshire, England.

It is a Grade II listed building on the National Heritage List for England. It is two storeys in height and constructed to a three-bay plan with a pair of four-bay wings to the rear of the house. The main door to the house has a Doric doorcase. It has extensive gardens including a lake with a boathouse and a weir. It is owned by Rishi Sunak, the former prime minister of the United Kingdom.

== History ==
The house was built in 1826, and was expanded in the 20th century. It is owned by Rishi Sunak, the former leader of the Conservative Party and the former prime minister of the United Kingdom. Sunak bought it for approximately £1.5 million before he was elected in 2015 as Member of Parliament for Richmond (Yorks), the constituency in which the house is located. In 2021, Sunak was granted planning permission to build a leisure complex with a gym, swimming pool and outdoor tennis court in a paddock at the house, which required an upgraded electricity supply. This work was expected to cost £400,000.

== See also ==
- Listed buildings in Kirby Sigston
