= Sir George Elliot, 2nd Baronet =

British politician

Sir George William Elliot 2nd Baronet
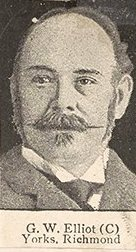
- Born: 13 May 1844; Houghton-le-Spring, England
- Died: 15 November 1895 (aged 51); Folkestone, England
- Education: Trinity College, Cambridge
- Occupations: Colliery owner; Member of parliament; Deputy lieutenant for Monmouth; Justice of the peace
- Parent: Sir George Elliot, 1st Baronet

Sir George William Elliot, 2nd Baronet (13 May 1844 – 15 November 1895) was an English colliery owner and Conservative politician who sat in the House of Commons in two periods between 1874 and 1895.

Elliot was born at Houghton-le-Spring, the son of Sir George Elliot, 1st Baronet and his wife Margaret Green, daughter of George Green. His father had been MP for North Durham. Elliot was educated at Edinburgh and at Trinity College, Cambridge. He was an athletics blue in 1865 and 1866. He was the owner of a colliery.

At the 1874 general election Elliot was elected member of parliament for Northallerton. He held the seat until 1885. In 1886, he was elected MP for Richmond and held the seat until 1895. He succeeded to the Baronetcy on the death of his father in 1893.

Elliot was master of the Bedale Hunt from 1884 to 1888, a deputy lieutenant for Monmouth and a J.P. He died at Folkestone at the age of 51.

Elliot married Sarah Taylor, daughter of Charles Taylor a colliery owner of Sunderland in 1866.

Parliament of the United Kingdom
Preceded by John Hutton	Member of Parliament for Northallerton; 1874 – 1885	Constituency abolished
Preceded by Sir Frederick Milbank, Bt	Member of Parliament for Richmond; 1886 – 1895	Succeeded by John Hutton
Baronetage of the United Kingdom
Preceded by George Elliot	Baronet (of Penshaw and Whitby); 1893–1895	Succeeded by George Elliot
