= Francis Lascelles =

English politician, soldier and businessman

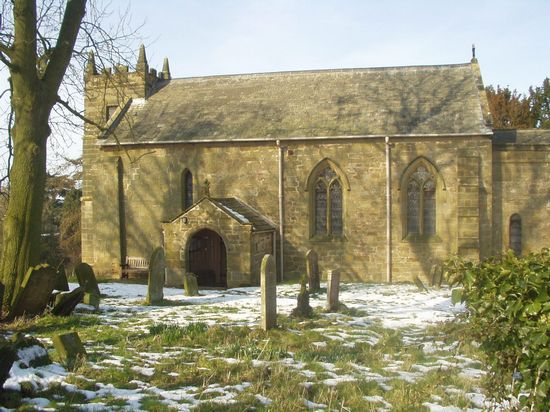
- St Lawrence, Kirby Sigston, where Francis was buried

MP for Northallerton
- In office April 1660 – June 1660 resigned

MP for Yorkshire & North Riding
- In office September 1654 – February 1658

Nominee for Yorkshire
- In office July 1653 – December 1653

MP for Thirsk
- In office 1645 – April 1653

Personal details
- Born: 23 August 1612 (baptised) Stank Hall, nr Kirby Sigston Yorkshire
- Died: 25 November 1667 (aged 55) Kirby Sigston
- Resting place: St Lawrence, Kirby Sigston
- Spouse(s): Frances, 1626–1658 †
- Children: Elizabeth (1640–1694), Daniel (1655–1734)
- Parent(s): William Lascelles (died 1624); Elizabeth Wadeson (died 1647)
- Education: Gray's Inn 1629
- Occupation: Politician, businessman and soldier

Francis Lascelles (1612–1667), also spelt Lassels, was an English politician, soldier and businessman who fought for Parliament in the 1639–1652 Wars of the Three Kingdoms and was a Member of Parliament between 1645 and 1660.

One of the MPs who retained their seat after Pride's Purge in December 1648, he was named as a member of the Commission appointed for the trial of Charles I in 1649. However, he did not sign the death warrant and largely escaped punishment after the 1660 Restoration, although he was fined and barred from holding public office.

In December 1662, he was accused of involvement in the so-called 'Lascelles Plot,' a conspiracy centred on Northallerton, which proved to be a fabrication by government informers. He died at home in November 1667.

== Biography ==
The Lascelles were a well established Yorkshire family, and part of a network of mercantile interests in London, Ireland, New England and Barbados. There were various branches in Yorkshire, including Northallerton, Durham, Whitby, York, Harewood House and Terrington. Francis Lascelles was born in August 1612 at Stank Hall, near Northallerton, eldest son of William Lascelles (died before 1624) and Elizabeth Wadeson (died 1647). He had three brothers, Robert (1617, died before 1640), Peregrine (1619–1658) and Thomas (1624–1697).

He married Frances St Quentin (1613–1658) in 1626; they had 16 children, only two of whom outlived their parents, Elizabeth (1640–1694) and his youngest son, Daniel (1655–1734). He died at home in November 1667 and was buried in the local church of St Lawrence.

== Career ==
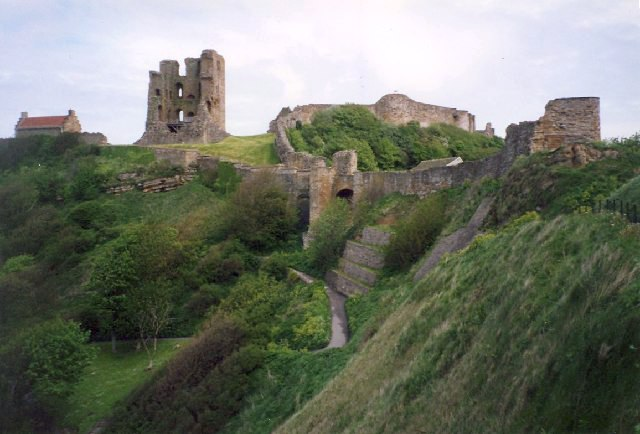
Scarborough Castle; Lascelles was part of the Parliamentary force that recaptured it in December 1648

Like many of his friends and relations, Francis supported Parliament during the 1639–1652 Wars of the Three Kingdoms; with his brothers Thomas and Peregrine, he is named in the Ordinances of Parliament as one of those responsible for raising money and men in Yorkshire, and signed the 1643 Solemn League and Covenant.

At the beginning of the First English Civil War in 1642, many on both sides were related to their opponents and thus reluctant to initiate hostilities. In October, Thomas Fairfax, later commander of Parliamentarian forces in the North, signed a pact of neutrality with a Royalist delegation led by his cousin Sir John Belasyse. This was denounced in writing by other supporters of Parliament, including Francis, who replaced Belasyse as Member of Parliament for Thirsk in 1645.

When the Second English Civil War broke out in 1648, Francis was a colonel and played a significant role in the campaign that ended with the defeat of the Royalist army at Preston in August. He then joined the force besieging Scarborough Castle, a key supply port in the north of England that changed hands seven times between 1642 and 1648. The Parliamentarian garrison defected after not being paid and they also received substantial Royalist reinforcements, including 300 Belgian mercenaries. When the castle surrendered in late December, a number of these were 'mistaken for Irish' and executed.

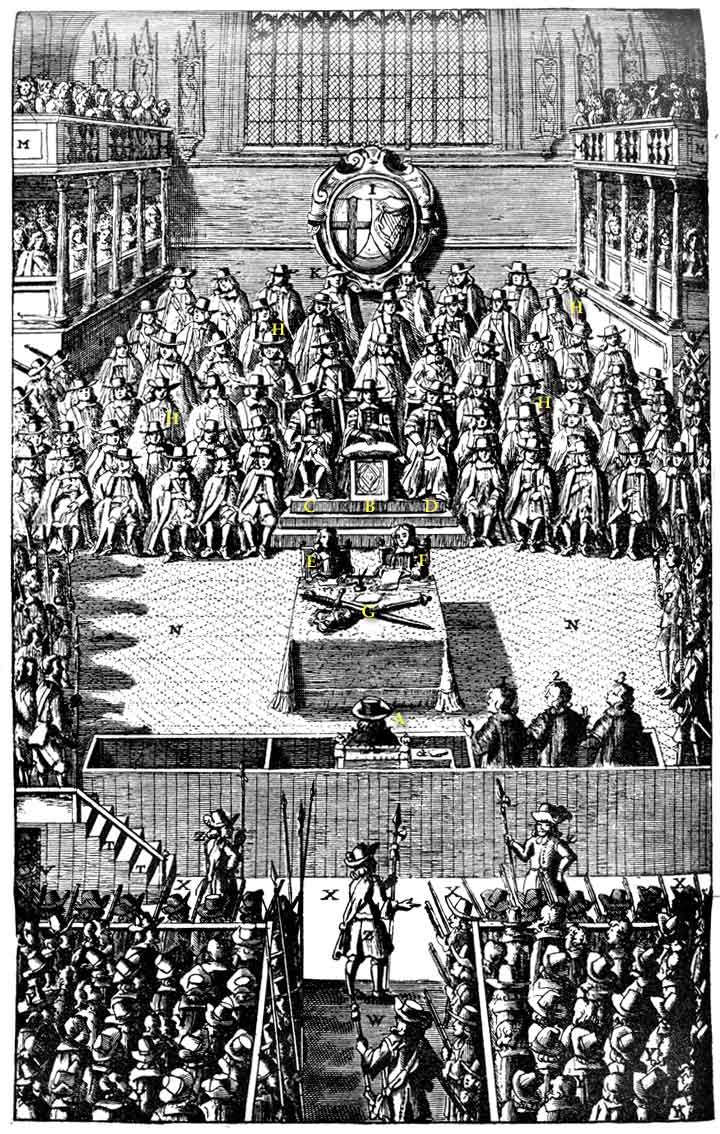
Trial of Charles I, January 1649; although nominated as a judge, Lascelles did not sign his death warrant

Between 1642 and 1648, England suffered an estimated 185,000 deaths from combat or disease, over 3.0% of the population; this compares with 2.6% in 1914–1918, while death rates in Scotland and Ireland were considerably higher. After 1648, Parliamentarian leaders like Cromwell and many members of the New Model Army believed Charles could not be trusted and only his death would end the conflict. Lascelles was nominated to the High Court of Justice set up for the trial, as one of the relatively conservative group of property-owning senior military officers known as 'Grandees'.

Of the 135 members nominated, only 68 attended, one being Lascelles; however, he was absent when sentence was passed and did not sign the death warrant, which later proved extremely important. Charles was executed on 30 January 1649 and Francis then participated in the Cromwellian conquest of Ireland. The March 1642 Adventurers' Act raised loans for an army to suppress the Irish Rebellion of 1641, which were repaid by confiscating lands held by the Irish rebels; enforcing it was one of the primary objectives of Cromwell's invasion.

There were a number of different tranches between 1642 and 1647 and although Lascelles is not listed as a subscriber, many of the individuals represented syndicates of investors, while there was an active resale market. Lands were only allocated in 1652 with the Act of Settlement but many subscribers sold their interests prior to that. It seems likely Francis was involved, since he and his brother Thomas had business interests in Ulster and a branch of the family was established in Killough, County Down.

Lascelles retained his seat as MP for Thirsk after Pride's Purge in December 1648; when the Rump Parliament was dissolved in April 1653, he was one of the 140 members nominated by the Army Council to the Barebones Parliament, which was in place from July to December 1653. After elections were restored in 1654, he was returned as MP for Yorkshire & North Riding in the First and Second Protectorate Parliaments.

When Cromwell died in 1659, it soon became clear his son and successor Richard could not govern and Lascelles was one of those who negotiated with General George Monck to restore the monarchy. The Commonwealth ended in 1660 with the Restoration of Charles II to the throne; in April, Francis and his brother Thomas were elected to the Convention Parliament as MPs for Northallerton.

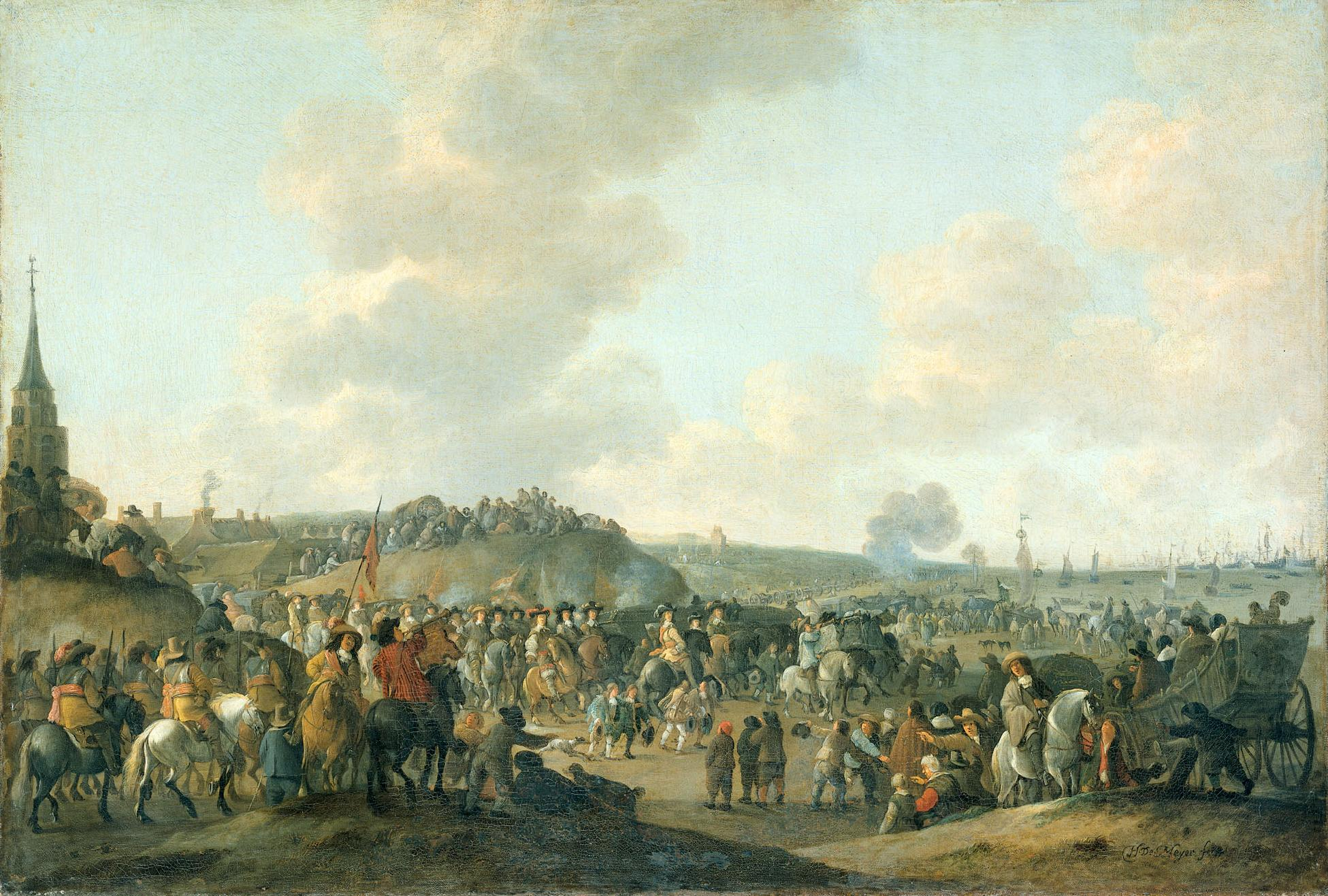
Charles II leaves Holland en route to England, 1660; his return ended Francis Lasceslles' political career

However, in July he and Thomas resigned their seats and went into exile in the Dutch Republic, since Francis was technically considered a Regicide and thus excluded from the Indemnity and Oblivion Act. Many were condemned to be Hanged, drawn and quartered, while the corpses of Oliver Cromwell, Bradshaw and Henry Ireton were dug up and dragged to Tyburn gallows. Francis avoided this fate because he was absent during sentencing, but also because ministers grew concerned by public reaction to the deaths. Even Samuel Pepys, who was an enthusiast for the new regime, recorded his admiration for the conduct of Thomas Harrison at his execution in October 1660.

The Lascelles were indemnified and allowed to return home, although Francis was fined and perpetually barred from holding public office. In December 1662, he was accused of being involved in the so-called 'Lascelles Plot,' a conspiracy of former New Model Army soldiers and radicals centred on Northallerton; this proved to be a fabrication by government informers, while the actual Rising in October 1663 quickly collapsed. He died at Stank Hall in November 1667.

== Sources ==
- Brydges, Egerton (1812). Peerage of England; Volume VIII. Bensley.
- Fowler, David. "English Civil War Casualties". Oliver Cromwell. Archived from the original on 27 February 2019.
- Henning, BD. "LASCELLES, Francis (1612–67), of Stank Hall, Kirby Sigston, Yorks". History of Parliament Online.
- HMSO (1819). Statutes of the Realm, Volume 5: 1628–80. pp. 226–224.
- Hopper, Andrew (2002). "The Farnley Wood Plot and the Memory of the Civil Wars in Yorkshire". The Historical Journal. 45 (2): 281–303. doi:10.1017/S0018246X02002406. S2CID 159769395.
- Hopper, Andrew (2007). Black Tom: Sir Thomas Fairfax and the English Revolution. Manchester University Press. ISBN 978-0719071089.
- Hinderwell, Thomas (1832). The history and antiquities of Scarborough. J Bye and Whittaker & Co. pp. 81–84.
- Jones, John (1859). History and Antiquities of Harewood, in the County of York, with topographical notices of its parishes and neighbourhoods. Simpkin, Marshall & Co.
- Manganiello, Stephen (2004). The Concise Encyclopedia of the Revolutions and Wars of England, Scotland, and Ireland, 1639–1660. Scarecrow Press. ISBN 978-0810851009.
- Pepys, Samuel (13 October 2003). "Saturday 13 October 1660". Pepys Diary.
- Plant, David. "Agitators". BCW Project.
- Smith, SD (2010). Slavery, Family, and Gentry Capitalism in the British Atlantic: The World of the Lascelles, 1648–1834. Cambridge University Press. ISBN 978-0521143004.

Parliament of Great Britain
Preceded by Thomas Kennedy	MP for Northallerton; April 1660 – July 1660	Succeeded by William Steuart
Vacant	MP for Yorkshire, North Riding; 1653–1659	Succeeded by John Dawnay
Preceded by John Belasyse	MP for Thirsk; 1645–1653	Succeeded by John Dawnay
