= Listed buildings in Kirby Sigston =

Kirby Sigston is a civil parish in the county of North Yorkshire, England. It contains three listed buildings that are recorded in the National Heritage List for England. Of these, one is listed at Grade I, the highest of the three grades, and the others are at Grade II, the lowest grade. The parish contains the village of Kirby Sigston and the surrounding area, and the listed buildings consist of a church, a house and a farmhouse.

== Key ==
Grade	Criteria
I	Buildings of exceptional interest, sometimes considered to be internationally important
II	Buildings of national importance and special interest

== Buildings ==
Name and location	Photograph	Date	Notes	Grade
St Lawrence's Church; 54.34583°N 1.36075°W		12th century	The church has been altered and extended through the centuries, the tower dates from the 18th century, and the church was restored and altered in 1893 by Temple Moore. It is built in stone with a stone slate roof, and consists of a nave, a north aisle, a south porch, a chancel and a west tower, The tower has three stages, a plinth, bands, rectangular bell openings, and an embattled parapet with obelisk corner pinnacles.	I
Holly Farmhouse; 54.33947°N 1.32907°W		Late 18th century	The farmhouse is in stone, and has a pantile roof with shaped kneelers and stone coping. There are two storeys and two bays. In the centre is a gabled wooden porch, and the windows are sashes, those in the ground floor with keystones.	II
The Manor House; 54.34708°N 1.36315°W		1826	The house is roughcast, on a plinth, with stone dressings, a floor band, a moulded cornice and blocking course, and a hipped stone slate roof. The main front has two storeys, and three bays, and there are two four-bay rear wings. The central doorway has a Doric doorcase a with half -columns, a frieze and a cornice, and the doorway has a fanlight. On the front is a two-storey canted bay window, and the other windows are sashes.	II
