= Sir John Beresford, 1st Baronet =

Royal Navy Admiral (1766–1844)

Admiral Sir John Beresford Bt KCB GCH
- Born: 1766
- Died: 2 October 1844 (aged 77–78)
- Relatives: William Carr Beresford, 1st Viscount Beresford (brother)
- Military career
- Allegiance: United Kingdom
- Branch: Royal Navy
- Service years: 1782–1835
- Rank: Admiral
- Commands: HMS Lynx; HMS Hussar; HMS Prévoyante; HMS Raison; HMS Unite; HMS Diana; HMS Virginie; HMS Cambrian; HMS Theseus; HMS Poictiers; HMS Royal Sovereign; Leith Station; Commander-in-Chief, The Nore
- Conflicts: French Revolutionary War Napoleonic Wars: Battle of the Basque Roads; War of 1812
- Awards: Knight Commander of the Order of the Bath; Knight Grand Cross of the Royal Guelphic Order; Order of the Tower and Sword

Admiral Sir John Poo [sic] Beresford, 1st Baronet, KCB, GCH (1766 – 2 October 1844) was a Royal Navy admiral, Second Sea Lord and Conservative Member of Parliament.

== Early life ==
Beresford was born in 1766 at Waterford. He was an illegitimate son of George Beresford, 2nd Earl of Tyrone; as well as a number of legitimate half-siblings, Beresford was also brother to General William Beresford, 1st Viscount Beresford, another illegitimate son. Beresford was educated at Catterick Bridge in Yorkshire before he joined the Royal Navy in 1782. He was taken on as a protégé by Captain Lord Longford in the 74-gun ship of the line HMS Alexander, as a captain's servant.

== Naval career ==
=== Early career ===
In Alexander Beresford was employed for a year and a half, serving mostly on the Newfoundland and Leeward Islands stations. He joined the 32-gun frigate HMS Winchelsea as a midshipman on 13 May 1784, and subsequently served in that rank in the 74-gun ship of the line HMS Ganges and 28-gun frigate HMS Maidstone. In Maidstone he passed his examination for the rank of lieutenant on 7 October 1787. He was promoted to lieutenant on 4 November 1790 and was sent to join the 28-gun frigate HMS Lapwing in the Mediterranean Sea. When the French Revolution began Lapwing was busily employed in rescuing British citizens living abroad, and Beresford was sent ashore at Genoa and Turin to arrange the escape of a number of these residents. In order to evade capture while doing this, he disguised himself as a peasant. Having completed these tasks, Beresford was appointed to the 74-gun ship of the line HMS Resolution in 1794. Resolution was based on the North America Station as flagship to Rear-Admiral George Murray, the commander-in-chief. In November of the same year Murray promoted Beresford to commander and gave him command of the 16-gun sloop HMS Lynx.

=== Command ===
In the following three months Beresford was able to demonstrate his naval abilities multiple times, first by protecting a convoy against two larger French warships, then by rescuing the grounded 38-gun frigate HMS Thetis in December, and finally by capturing a powerful French privateer. Murray rewarded him for these deeds with command of the 28-gun frigate HMS Hussar with the acting rank of post-captain in February 1795. Beresford was then sent, under the orders of Captain Alexander Cochrane of Thetis, to attack a group of five French store ships known to be in Hampton Roads. These store ships were heavily armed and some were en flute frigates. The two British ships found the French on 17 May 1795 and engaged them, capturing two of the ships, Prévoyante and Raison. In reward for the action Murray transferred Beresford to command the larger Prévoyante, and Beresford used his personal funds to have her refitted as a 40-gun frigate at Halifax, using the captures he subsequently made in the ship to reimburse himself. However, the Admiralty decided that she was too large a vessel for him and instead appointed him to the smaller Raison despite the exertion he had put into Prévoyante. Raison was taken into service with the Royal Navy as a 30-gun frigate.

Some time after this Beresford was sent in Raison to take £200,000 of specie from Boston to Halifax. On 25 August 1796 he was intercepted by the much larger French frigate Vengeance while much of his crew were away securing an American merchant ship as a prize. The French ship chased Raison in a running fight, but after being forced to drop back having been damaged, Vengeance then lost Beresford's ship when he escaped into a bank of fog. Having completed the delivery of the specie, Beresford continued on station. In March 1797 he captured a valuable Spanish merchant ship off the Bahamas and destroyed another against the shore by tricking the enemy ships into thinking Raison was a ship of the line. Having made several other prizes in the following months, he was sent as escort to a homeward-bound convoy at the end of the year, and upon reaching Britain Raison was paid off.

At the start of 1798 Beresford was given his next command, the 32-gun frigate HMS Unite. He was again sent to serve on the Leeward Islands Station. In the following five years he participated in the captures of Surinam, St Martin, St Bartholomew, St Thomas, St John, and Santa Cruz. At some point during this period he transferred commands to the 38-gun frigate HMS Diana, and he served as senior officer of frigates under Rear-Admiral Sir John Duckworth in 1801. Just before the Peace of Amiens began he returned to England as escort to a convoy of 200 ships. Diana was then paid off, and Beresford stayed on land until the peace ended in 1803. At this point he was given command of the 40-gun frigate HMS Virginie to serve in the North Sea. He did so for around a year before the strains on serving in such bad conditions paid their toll on Virginie, and she was deemed unseaworthy.

=== Senior command ===
Beresford was then sent to the North America Station again, where he took command of the 44-gun frigate HMS Cambrian. In the following months Beresford became a successful prize taker on station and then when on 26 February 1806 the commander-in-chief, Admiral Sir Andrew Mitchell, died, he served as senior officer on station until his replacement could arrive. In 1808 Beresford was transferred into the 74-gun ship of the line HMS Theseus. Initially he served in her in the English Channel, but he then moved to serve in the Ferrol blockade squadron of Captain Sir Richard King. After eight months of blockade there, Beresford was sent in command of three other ships of the line to blockade Lorient. In February 1809 he was engaged there in stopping French units from entering the port and joining with the ships already there, but he was forced off station on 21 February by the large squadron of Jean-Baptiste Philibert Willaumez. He continued the blockade until March, when he instead joined the fleet of Admiral Lord Gambier, and as such participated in the Battle of the Basque Roads in April, for which he was the originator of the idea for a fireship attack.

In summer 1809, he was called as a witness at the court-martial of James, Lord Gambier which assessed whether Admiral Lord Gambier had failed to support Captain Lord Cochrane at the Battle of Basque Roads. Gambier was controversially cleared of all charges.

At the start of 1810 Theseus was paid off and Beresford was instead given command of the 74-gun ship of the line HMS Poictiers. He initially served as senior officer on the blockade of Brest but after four months he was sent to Lisbon where he worked in cooperation with the army of Lieutenant-General Lord Wellington. By 1811 he was serving at the blockade of the Texel in the North Sea, but in 1812 the War of 1812 broke out against America, and Beresford was sent there to assist in that war. He served off the coast of America for the duration of the war, for the last year of which he was made a commodore.

During the war he ineptly bombarded Lewes in Delaware. The Beresford-led Poictiers—four hours after USS Wasp, commanded by Jacob Jones, captured HMS Frolic—captured Wasp, recaptured Frolic and brought both to Bermuda. He saw little action in which to distinguish himself in the War of 1812, but in that same year was knighted on 22 May. He returned home in November 1813.

=== Later service ===
In 1814 Beresford was given command of one of the royal yachts, HMS Royal Sovereign. On 24 April of that year he participated in the convoy that took Louis XVIII back to France at the end of the Napoleonic Wars, with Royal Sovereign conveying the monarch and a large entourage. For his services he was made a baronet on 21 May and then was promoted to rear-admiral on 4 June. He was given the 74-gun ship of the line HMS Duncan as his flag ship in the following year, and in her sailed to Rio de Janeiro with orders to take John VI of Portugal back to his homeland. Upon arriving there the prince regent decided that he did not wish to return at that time, and so Beresford returned to Britain. Despite the futility of his mission, John VI bestowed upon Beresford the Order of the Tower and Sword. He was appointed a Knight Commander of the Order of the Bath on 12 August 1819, and in 1820 was given command of the Leith Station. He was promoted to vice-admiral on 27 May 1825 and served as a commissioner of the Admiralty between 23 December 1834 and 25 April 1835, in result of which he was appointed a Knight Grand Cross of the Royal Guelphic Order in May 1836. He was finally promoted to admiral on 28 June 1838.

== Political career ==
He was MP for Coleraine 1809–12 & 1814–23, Berwick-upon-Tweed 1823–26, Northallerton 1826–32, and Chatham 1835–37.

== Family ==
On 22 June 1809 in London, Beresford married Mary Molloy, the daughter of Captain Anthony James Pye Molloy; they had a son, George, before Mary's death in 1813.

On 17 August 1815, in London, Beresford was remarried to Harriet Elizabeth Peirse, daughter of Henry Peirse, and with her had two sons (Henry William and John George) and four daughters (Harriet Charlotte, Mary Anne Araminta [died 1818], Georgiana and Mary Anne Catherine). Harriet Peirse Beresford died in 1825. Her widower remarried, to Amelia Peach, widow of Samuel Peach and daughter of James Bailie, on 26 May 1836 in County Armagh, Ireland. They had no children, and Amelia outlived him. He was succeeded in the baronetcy by his son from the first marriage, George, who, as he had no surviving sons, was later succeeded by his half-nephew.

== Notes ==
Parliament of the United Kingdom
Preceded by Walter Jones	Member of Parliament for Coleraine; 1809–1812	Succeeded by Lord George Beresford
Preceded by Viscount Ossulston; Sir Francis Blake, Bt.	Member of Parliament for Berwick-upon-Tweed; 1823–1826; With: Sir Francis Blake, Bt.	Succeeded by Marcus Beresford; John Gladstone
Preceded by William Lascelles; Marcus Beresford	Member of Parliament for Northallerton; 1826–1832; With: Henry Lascelles to 1831; William Lascelles from 1831	Succeeded by John George Boss
Preceded by William Taylor Copeland	Member of Parliament for Coleraine; 1832–1833	Succeeded by William Taylor Copeland
Preceded by George Stevens Byng	Member of Parliament for Chatham; 1835–1837	Succeeded by George Stevens Byng
Military offices
Preceded by Sir Henry Blackwood	Commander-in-Chief, The Nore; 1830–1833	Succeeded by Sir Richard King
Preceded by Sir William Parker	Second Naval Lord; 1834–1835	Succeeded by Sir William Parker
Baronetage of the United Kingdom
New title	Baronet of Bagnall; 1814–1844	Succeeded by George Beresford
