= Edward Lascelles, 1st Earl of Harewood =

British politician and peer

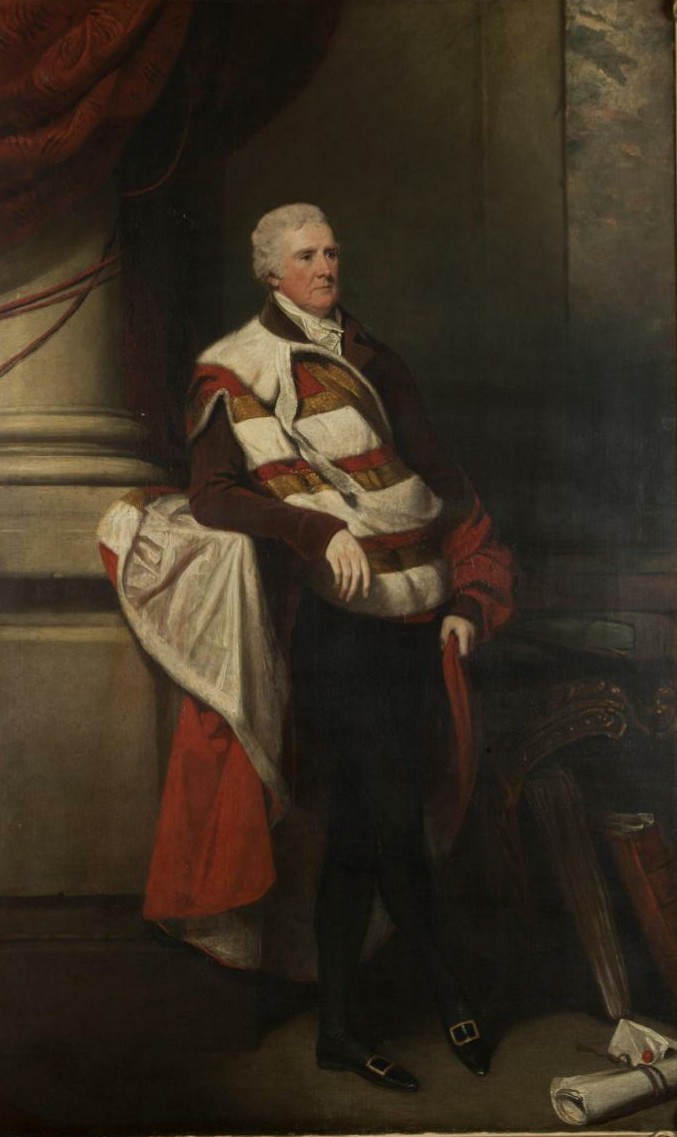
Edward Lascelles, 1st Earl of Harewood in peer robes

Edward Lascelles, 1st Earl of Harewood (7 January 1740 – 3 April 1820) was a British landowner, art collector, peer and, before which, member of parliament.

== Early life ==
He was the son of Edward Lascelles, a senior customs official in Barbados, himself a son of Daniel Lascelles.

== Career ==
On the death of his cousin, the childless Edwin Lascelles, 1st Baron Harewood, Edward inherited the family fortune made in the West Indies through customs positions and the slave trade. He vested much of his fortune in fine art. In 1799 he (or his immediate family benefit trust) was estimated to be the third-wealthiest small family unit in Britain, owning £2.9M (equivalent to £286,400,000 in 2025).

He sat as Whig member of parliament for Northallerton from 1761 to 1774 and from 1790 to 1796. The latter year he was raised to the peerage as Baron Harewood, of Harewood in the County of York. In 1812 he was further honoured when he was made Viscount Lascelles and Earl of Harewood, in the County of York.

== Personal life ==
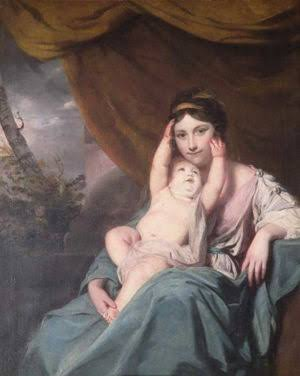
Anne Lascelles (née Chaloner), Countess of Harewood, 1762/1764

On 12 May 1761, Lascelles was married to Anne Chaloner (c. 1742–1805), a daughter of Thomas Chaloner of Guisborough and Mary Finny. Before her death on 22 February 1805, they had four children:

- Lady Mary Anne Lascelles (d. 1831), who married Richard York and had issue.
- Edward Lascelles, Viscount Lascelles (c. 1764–1814), who died unmarried.
- Henry Lascelles, 2nd Earl of Harewood (1767–1841)
- Lady Frances Lascelles (c. 1777–1817), who married Hon. John Douglas, a son of James Douglas, 14th Earl of Morton and had issue.

Lord Harewood died on 3 April 1820 and was succeeded in his titles by his second son, Henry.

Parliament of Great Britain
Preceded by Daniel Lascelles; Edwin Lascelles	Member of Parliament for Northallerton; 1761–1774; With: Daniel Lascelles	Succeeded by Daniel Lascelles; Henry Peirse
Preceded by Henry Peirse; Edwin Lascelles	Member of Parliament for Northallerton; 1790–1796; With: Henry Peirse	Succeeded by Henry Peirse; Edward Lascelles
Peerage of Great Britain
New creation	Baron Harewood; 1796–1820	Succeeded by Henry Lascelles
Peerage of the United Kingdom
New creation	Earl of Harewood; 1812–1820	Succeeded by Henry Lascelles
