= Northallerton (constituency) =

Parliamentary constituency in the United Kingdom, 1832–1885

- Former borough constituency for the House of Commons

1640–1885
- Replaced by: Richmond

Northallerton was a parliamentary borough in the North Riding of Yorkshire, represented by two Members of Parliament in the House of Commons briefly in the 13th century and again from 1640 to 1832, and by one member from 1832 until 1885.

The constituency consisted of the market town of Northallerton, the county town of the North Riding. In 1831 it encompassed only 622 houses and a population of 3,004. The right to vote was vested in the holders of the burgage tenements, of which there were roughly 200 – most of which were ruined or consisted only of stables or cowhouses, and had no value except for the vote which was attached to them. As in most other burgage boroughs, the ownership of the burgages had early become concentrated in the hands of a single family, who in effect had a free hand to nominate both MPs. At the time of the Great Reform Act in 1832, the patrons were the Earl of Harewood and Henry Peirse, who was the Earl's brother-in-law.

Under the Reform Act, the boundaries were extended to include neighbouring Romanby and Brompton, increasing the population to 4,839, and its representation was reduced to a single member. The Act also, of course, extended the franchise.

At the 1885 election, the constituency was abolished, being absorbed into the new Richmond division of the North Riding.

== Members of Parliament ==
Northallerton re-enfranchised by Parliament, Nov 1640

=== MPs 1640–1832 ===
Election	First member	First party	Second member	Second party
November 1640	Henry Darley	Parliamentarian	John Wastell	Parliamentarian
1653	Northallerton was unrepresented in the Barebones Parliament			
1654,1656	Northallerton was unrepresented in the First and Second Parliaments of the Protectorate			
January 1659	James Danby		Major George Smithson	
May 1659	Henry Darley		One seat vacant	
April 1660	Thomas Lascelles		Francis Lascelles	
July 1660	Thomas Lascelles		George Marwood	
1661	Gilbert Gerard		Roger Talbot	
1679	Gilbert Gerard		Sir Henry Calverley	
1685	Sir David Foulis		Sir Henry Marwood	
1689	Thomas Lascelles		Sir William Robinson	
1695	Thomas Lascelles		Sir William Hustler	
1697	Ralph Milbancke		Sir William Hustler	
1701	Robert Dormer		Sir William Hustler	
February 1702	Daniel Lascelles		Sir William Hustler	
July 1702	John Aislabie	Tory	Sir William Hustler	
November 1702	John Aislabie	Tory	Robert Dormer	
May 1705	Sir William Hustler		Robert Dormer	
December 1705	Sir William Hustler		Roger Gale	
1710	Robert Raikes		Roger Gale	
1713	Leonard Smelt		Henry Peirse	
1715	Leonard Smelt		Cholmley Turner	
1722	Leonard Smelt		Henry Peirse	
1740	William Smelt		Henry Peirse	
1745	Henry Lascelles		Henry Peirse	
1752	Daniel Lascelles		Henry Peirse	
1754	Daniel Lascelles	Tory	Edwin Lascelles	Tory
1761	Daniel Lascelles	Tory	Edward Lascelles	Tory
1774	Daniel Lascelles	Tory	Henry Peirse (younger)	Whig
1780	Edwin Lascelles	Tory	Henry Peirse (younger)	Whig
1790	Edward Lascelles	Tory	Henry Peirse (younger)	Whig
1796	Viscount Lascelles	Tory	Henry Peirse (younger)	Whig
1814	John Bacon Sawrey Morritt	Tory	Henry Peirse (younger)	Whig
1818	Viscount Lascelles	Tory	Henry Peirse (younger)	Whig
1820	William Lascelles	Tory	Henry Peirse (younger)	Whig
1824	William Lascelles	Tory	Marcus Beresford	Tory
1826	Admiral Sir John Beresford	Tory	Henry Lascelles	Tory
1831	Admiral Sir John Beresford	Tory	William Lascelles	Tory

=== MPs 1832–1885 ===
Election	Member	Party
1832	Representation reduced to one member	
1832	Capt. John Boss R.N.	Radical
1835	William Battie-Wrightson	Whig
1859	William Battie-Wrightson	Liberal
1865	Charles Mills	Conservative
1866	Hon. Egremont Lascelles	Conservative
1868	John Hutton	Conservative
1874	George Elliot	Conservative
1885	Constituency abolished: see Richmond (Yorks)	

== Election results ==
=== Elections in the 1830s ===
General election 1830: Northallerton
Party	Candidate	Votes	%
Tory	Henry Lascelles	Unopposed	
Tory	John Beresford	Unopposed	
Tory hold			
Tory hold			

General election 1831: Northallerton
Party	Candidate	Votes	%
Tory	William Lascelles	Unopposed	
Tory	John Beresford	Unopposed	
Registered electors		c. 200	
Tory hold			
Tory hold			

General election 1832: Northallerton
Party	Candidate	Votes	%
Radical	John George Boss	108	52.7
Whig	William Battie-Wrightson	97	47.3
Majority		11	5.4
Turnout		205	88.4
Registered electors		232	
Radical gain from Tory			

General election 1835: Northallerton
Party	Candidate	Votes	%
Whig	William Battie-Wrightson	Unopposed	
Registered electors		261	
Whig gain from Radical			

General election 1837: Northallerton
Party	Candidate	Votes	%
Whig	William Battie-Wrightson	Unopposed	
Registered electors		278	
Whig hold			

=== Elections in the 1840s ===
General election 1841: Northallerton
Party	Candidate	Votes	%	±%
Whig	William Battie-Wrightson	129	53.1	N/A
Conservative	Edwin Lascelles	114	46.9	New
Majority		15	6.2	N/A
Turnout		243	86.5	N/A
Registered electors		281		
Whig hold		Swing	N/A	

General election 1847: Northallerton
Party	Candidate	Votes	%	±%
Whig	William Battie-Wrightson	Unopposed		
Registered electors		269		
Whig hold				

=== Elections in the 1850s ===
General election 1852: Northallerton
Party	Candidate	Votes	%	±%
Whig	William Battie-Wrightson	Unopposed		
Registered electors		281		
Whig hold				

General election 1857: Northallerton
Party	Candidate	Votes	%	±%
Whig	William Battie-Wrightson	129	50.6	N/A
Conservative	Egremont Lascelles	126	49.4	New
Majority		3	1.2	N/A
Turnout		255	93.8	N/A
Registered electors		272		
Whig hold		Swing	N/A	

General election 1859: Northallerton
Party	Candidate	Votes	%	±%
Liberal	William Battie-Wrightson	138	50.4	−0.2
Conservative	Charles Mills	136	49.6	+0.2
Majority		2	0.8	−0.4
Turnout		274	96.8	+3.0
Registered electors		283		
Liberal hold		Swing	−0.2	

=== Elections in the 1860s ===
General election 1865: Northallerton
Party	Candidate	Votes	%	±%
Conservative	Charles Mills	239	55.7	+6.1
Liberal	Jasper Johns	190	44.3	−6.1
Majority		49	11.4	N/A
Turnout		429	97.1	+0.3
Registered electors		442		
Conservative gain from Liberal		Swing	+6.1	

The election was declared void on petition, due to bribery by agents, causing a by-election.

By-election, 10 May 1866: Northallerton
Party	Candidate	Votes	%	±%
Conservative	Egremont Lascelles	224	52.7	−3.0
Liberal	William Battie-Wrightson	201	47.3	+3.0
Majority		23	5.4	−6.0
Turnout		425	96.2	−0.9
Registered electors		442		
Conservative hold		Swing	−3.0	

General election 1868: Northallerton
Party	Candidate	Votes	%	±%
Conservative	John Hutton	386	50.9	−4.8
Liberal	Jasper Johns	372	49.1	+4.8
Majority		14	1.8	−9.6
Turnout		758	93.8	−3.3
Registered electors		808		
Conservative hold		Swing	−4.8	

=== Elections in the 1870s ===
General election 1874: Northallerton
Party	Candidate	Votes	%	±%
Conservative	George Elliot	387	50.6	−0.3
Liberal	William Battie-Wrightson	378	49.4	+0.3
Majority		9	1.2	−0.6
Turnout		765	92.3	−1.5
Registered electors		829		
Conservative hold		Swing	−0.3	

=== Elections in the 1880s ===
General election 1880: Northallerton
Party	Candidate	Votes	%	±%
Conservative	George Elliot	483	55.8	+5.2
Liberal	Albert Osliff Rutson	383	44.2	−5.2
Majority		100	11.6	+10.4
Turnout		866	95.0	+2.7
Registered electors		912		
Conservative hold		Swing	+5.2	

== Notes and references ==
- D Brunton & D H Pennington, "Members of the Long Parliament" (London: George Allen & Unwin, 1954)
- "Cobbett's Parliamentary history of England, from the Norman Conquest in 1066 to the year 1803" (London: Thomas Hansard, 1808)
- J Holladay Philbin, "Parliamentary Representation 1832 – England and Wales" (New Haven: Yale University Press, 1965)
- Henry Stooks Smith, "The Parliaments of England from 1715 to 1847" (2nd edition, edited by FWS Craig – Chichester: Parliamentary Reference Publications, 1973)
- Frederic A Youngs, jr, "Guide to the Local Administrative Units of England, Vol II" (London: Royal Historical Society, 1991)
- Leigh Rayment's Historical List of MPs – Constituencies beginning with "N" (part 2)
