= Frederick Horn =

British Army general

General Sir Frederick Horn GCB
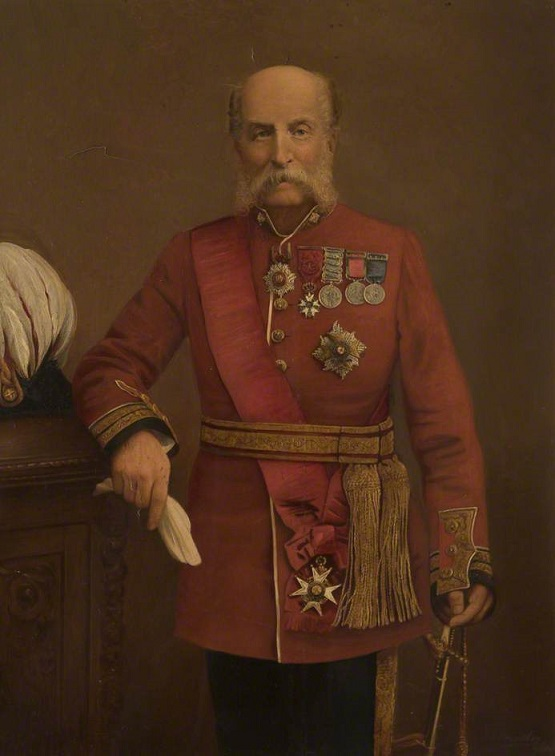
- Born: 21 June 1805; Mansfield
- Died: 1894 (aged 88–89)
- Military career
- Allegiance: United Kingdom
- Branch: British Army
- Service years: 1826–1880
- Rank: General
- Commands: 4th Division
- Conflicts: Crimean War
- Awards: Knight Grand Cross of the Order of the Bath

General Sir Frederick Horn GCB (21 June 1805 – 1894) was a senior British Army officer who briefly commanded the 4th Division at the Battle of Inkerman during the Crimean War.

== Military career ==
Horn was commissioned as an ensign in the 20th (East Devonshire) Regiment of Foot on 26 January 1826. He served in India from May 1826 until May 1831 and again from May 1834 to January 1837. He was deployed to Ireland in early 1841 and to Bermuda in November 1841; he was promoted to lieutenant-colonel and given command of the reserve battalion of his regiment in April 1846. He was deployed to Canada and succeeded to the command of the 1st Battalion of his regiment in June 1849.

After the outbreak of the Crimean War, Horn commanded the right brigade of the 4th Division at the Battle of the Alma in September 1854 and then commanded the 1st Battalion of his regiment at the Battle of Balaclava in October 1854 and at the Battle of Inkerman in November 1854. After his senior officers had been wounded or killed at Inkerman he was briefly acting General Officer Commanding the 4th Division and, in that capacity, he withdrew the division from action. He was present at the Siege of Sevastopol in winter 1854 and was given command of a brigade in the Highland Division in the Crimea in June 1855. He went on to command a brigade in Malta from October 1856 to November 1861.

Horn was promoted to major-general on 13 October 1860, to lieutenant-general on 18 January 1870 and to full general on 2 June 1877. He was appointed a Companion of the Order of the Bath on 5 July 1855, advanced to Knight Commander on 2 June 1869 and Knight Grand Cross on 25 May 1889.

Military offices
Preceded by Marcus Beresford	Colonel of the 20th (the East Devonshire) Regiment of Foot; 1876–1894	Succeeded by Sir William Pollexfen Radcliffe
