= John Hutton (Conservative politician) =

British politician

Hutton in 1895.

John Hutton (10 January 1847 – 19 December 1921) was a British Conservative politician who was a Member of Parliament in the House of Commons in two periods between 1868 and 1906.

Hutton was the son of John Hutton of Sowber Hill and his wife Caroline Robson, daughter of Thomas Robson of Holtby Hall, Yorkshire. He was educated at Eton College and Christ Church, Oxford. He was commissioned as a Lieutenant in the North York Rifle Militia in 1865 and promoted to Captain in 1869. He was also a J.P. for the North Riding of Yorkshire.

At the 1868 general election, Hutton was elected Member of Parliament for Northallerton. He held the seat until 1874. At the 1895 general election, Hutton was elected MP for Richmond, Yorkshire, which by then included Northallerton. He held the seat until 1906.

Hutton died at the age of 74.

Parliament of the United Kingdom
Preceded by Hon. Egremont Lascelles	Member of Parliament for Northallerton; 1868–1874	Succeeded by George Elliot
Preceded by George Elliot	Member of Parliament for Richmond; 1895–1906	Succeeded by Sir Francis Dyke Acland
