= Henry Peirse (younger) =

British politician

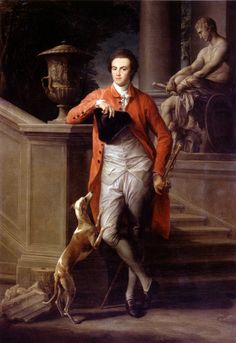
- Born: 1750s
- Died: 14 May 1824
- Education: Eton College
- Alma mater: Pembroke College, Cambridge
- Occupation: Politician
- Spouse: Charlotte Grace Monson
- Relatives: John Monson, 3rd Baron Monson (father-in-law)

Henry Peirse (c. 1754–1824) was a British politician who sat in the House of Commons for 50 years from 1774 to 1824.

== Early life ==
Peirce was the son of Henry Peirse MP of Bedale, Yorkshire and his wife Anne Johnson. His father died in 1759 and he inherited the Bedale Hall estate. He was educated at Eton College from 1764 to 1770 and was admitted at Pembroke College, Cambridge on 3 July 1771, aged 17. He undertook a Grand Tour which included Rome, Naples, Venice and Paris. While in Rome in 1775 his portrait was painted by Pompeo Batoni. He married Hon. Charlotte Grace Monson, daughter of John Monson, 3rd Baron Monson on 16 August 1777.

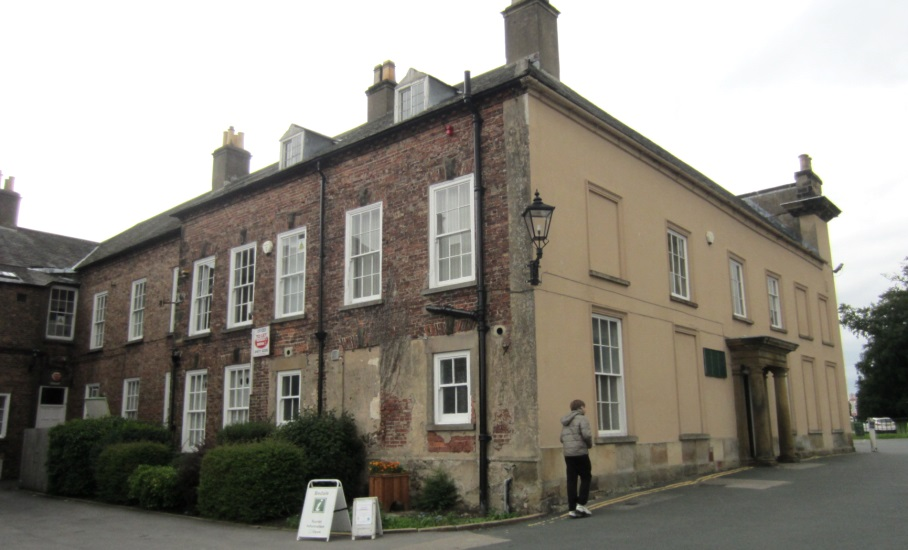
Bedale Hall at the rear

Bedale Hall underwent some transformation under Pierce, and about 1777 he enlarged the house by incorporating into it an old Inn, so that the house became attached to the town houses on the west side of the Market Place. More significantly at some time a new stable wing was added to the house and a racing stud was established which became very successful.

== Political career ==
The Peirse family had controlled one seat at Northallerton since the 17th century. While Peirse was under 21 the Lascelles family were allowed both seats. When he came of age he reclaimed his seat and at the 1774 general election was returned as Member of Parliament for Northallerton. He counted himself a Whig and joined Brooks's in 1778. In 1779 the Public Ledger described him as ‘a gentleman of very good character, and attached to Opposition from principle and conviction’. He was a member of the St. Alban's Tavern group which in January 1784 tried to bring together Fox and Pitt. Although his attendance remained somewhat unpredictable he voted in many of the major issues. His final election was in 1820.

== Horse Racing ==
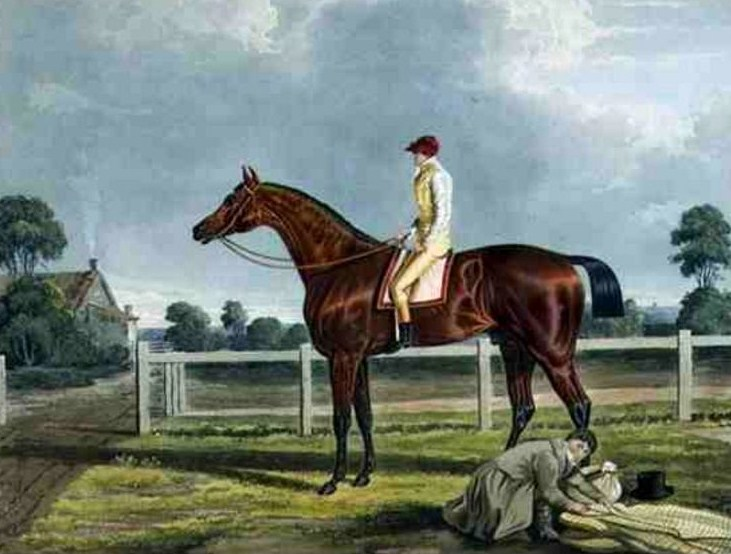
Reveller

Peirse operated a racing stud at Bedale Hall and had some success on the racecourse. He won the St Leger Stakes twice with Ebor in 1817 and Reveller in 1818.

Peirse died on 14 May 1824.

Parliament of Great Britain
Preceded by Daniel Lascelles; Edward Lascelles	Member of Parliament for Northallerton; 1774–1824; With: Daniel Lascelles 1774-1780; Edwin Lascelles 1780-1790; Edward Lascelles 1790-1796; Viscount Lascelles 1796-1814; John Bacon Sawrey Morritt 1814-1818; Viscount Lascelles 1818-1830; William Lascelles 1820-1824	Succeeded by William Lascelles; Marcus Beresford
