= Henry Lascelles, 3rd Earl of Harewood =

British peer and Member of Parliament

The Right Honourable The Earl of Harewood DL
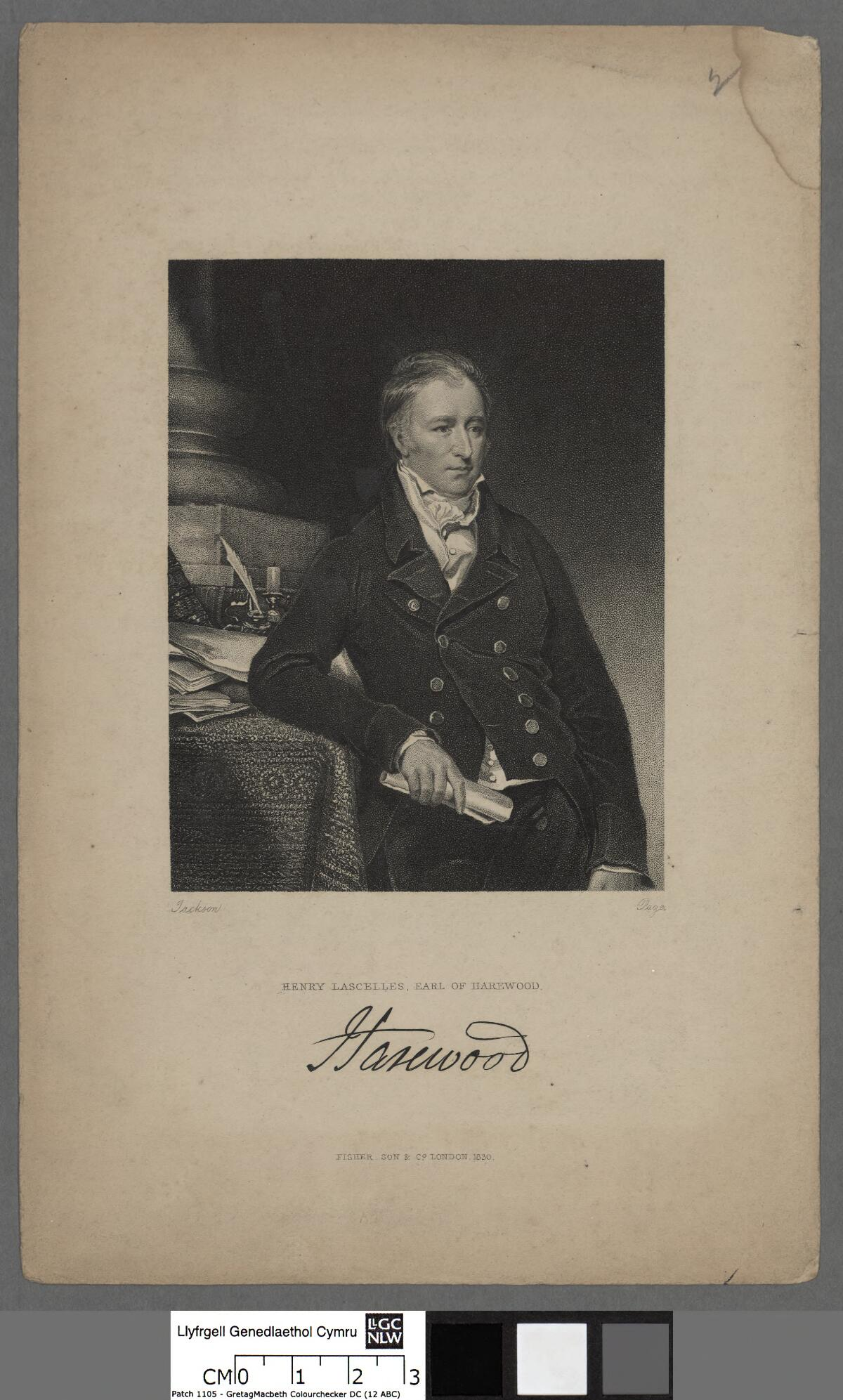

Member of Parliament for Northallerton
- In office 1826–1831 Serving with Sir John Poo Beresford
- Preceded by: William Lascelles; Marcus Beresford
- Succeeded by: Sir John Poo Beresford; William Lascelles

Personal details
- Born: 11 June 1797
- Died: 22 February 1857 (aged 59)
- Spouse: Lady Louisa Thynne (m. 1823)
- Children: 14; including Henry Lascelles, 4th Earl of Harewood
- Parent(s): Henry Lascelles, 2nd Earl of Harewood; Henrietta Sebright

Henry Lascelles, 3rd Earl of Harewood DL (11 June 1797 – 22 February 1857), known as Viscount Lascelles from 1839 to 1841, was a British peer and Member of Parliament.

== Background ==
Lascelles was born in 1797. He was the second son of Henry Lascelles, 2nd Earl of Harewood, and Henrietta Sebright, daughter of Sir John Sebright, 6th Baronet.

== Military service ==
Lascelles was commissioned as an ensign in the 1st Foot Guards in 1814 and fought in the Battle of Waterloo when he was slightly wounded by an exploding shell when carrying the standard of his (Second) battalion of the regiment. He went onto half-pay in 1820, the year he began to serve part-time as a lieutenant in the Yorkshire Hussars Yeomanry in 1820, but he did not fully retire from the regular army until 1831.

== Public life ==
He sat as Member of Parliament for Northallerton from 1826 to 1831 and also served as Lord Lieutenant of the West Riding of Yorkshire between 1846 and 1857.

On 20 May 1848, he became a member of the Canterbury Association. Harewood Forest (beyond Oxford) and the Christchurch suburb of Harewood (where Christchurch International Airport is located) are named for him.

== Family ==
Lord Harewood married Lady Louisa Thynne (25 March 1801 - 1859), daughter of Thomas Thynne, 2nd Marquess of Bath, on 5 July 1823. They had thirteen children:

- Henry Thynne Lascelles, 4th Earl of Harewood (1824–1892)
- Egremont William Lascelles (1825–1892), married Jessie Malcolm and had issue.
- George Edwin Lascelles (1826–1911), married Lady Louisa Murray, daughter of William Murray, 4th Earl of Mansfield, and had issue.
- Algernon Francis Lascelles (1828–1845), died young.
- Alfred Lascelles (1829–1845), died young.
- Lady Louisa Isabella Lascelles (1830–1918), married Charles Mills, 1st Baron Hillingdon, and had issue.
- Reverend James Walter Lascelles (1831–1901), Canon of Ripon Cathedral and Rector at Goldsborough, married Emma Clara Miles (1830–1911), daughter of Sir William Miles, 1st Baronet, and had nine children.
- Lady Susan Charlotte Lascelles (1834–1927), married Edward Montagu-Stuart-Wortley-Mackenzie, 1st Earl of Wharncliffe, d.s.p.
- Horace Douglas Lascelles (1835–1869), died unmarried.
- Lady Blanche Emma Lascelles (1837–1863), married Henry Boyle, 5th Earl of Shannon, and had issue.
- Lady Florence Harriet Lascelles (1838–1901), married Lt.-Col. John Cust, grandson of Brownlow Cust, 1st Baron Brownlow.
- Lady Mary Elizabeth Lascelles (c. 1843–1866), married Sir Robert Meade, son of Richard Meade, 3rd Earl of Clanwilliam, and had issue.
- Lady Maud Caroline Lascelles (1846–1938), married Lord George Hamilton and had issue.

Harewood and his wife resided for a time at the ancestral seat of the family, Goldsborough Hall in the eponymous North Yorkshire village. The widowed Lady Harewood retired to Upper Brook Street where she lived until her death with her daughter Lady Florence Lascelles.

== Death ==
The Earl sustained a fractured skull and other injuries while fox hunting and died four weeks later in 1857, aged 59 years.

Parliament of the United Kingdom
Preceded by William Lascelles; Marcus Beresford	Member of Parliament for Northallerton; 1826–1831; With: Sir John Poo Beresford	Succeeded by Sir John Poo Beresford; William Lascelles
Honorary titles
Preceded by The Lord Wharncliffe	Lord Lieutenant of the West Riding of Yorkshire; 1846–1857	Succeeded by The Earl FitzWilliam
Peerage of the United Kingdom
Preceded by Henry Lascelles	Earl of Harewood; 1841–1857	Succeeded by Henry Lascelles
