= William Smelt (politician) =

English member of parliament

William Smelt (10 January 1690 – 14 September 1755) was an English member of parliament.

== Life ==
He was the second son of Leonard Smelt of Kirkby Fleetham - his elder brother Leonard was disinherited since their father had run through the family estate.

He succeeded Leonard Jr as MP for Northallerton from 1740 until 1745, when he stood down and accepted a post as receiver general of casual revenue for Barbados from 1745 to his death. He sold the family interest in the Northallerton seat to Henry Lascelles.

He was buried in the family vault in the chantry chapel in the north aisle of Kirkby Fleetham church.

== Marriage and issue ==
He married Dorothy Cayley, daughter of Cornelius Cayley of York - two of her brothers were Cornelius (1692–1779; Recorder of Hull) and John Cayley (1735–1790; British Consul at St Petersburg). Cayley and Smelt had four daughters and four sons, including:

- Cornelius Smelt, father of the better-known Cornelius Smelt (1748–1832)
- Leonard Smelt (1719-1800).

== Sources ==
- http://www.historyofparliamentonline.org/volume/1715-1754/member/smelt-william-1690-1755
