= Kirby Sigston =

Village and civil parish in North Yorkshire, England

Coordinates: 54°21′N 1°21′W

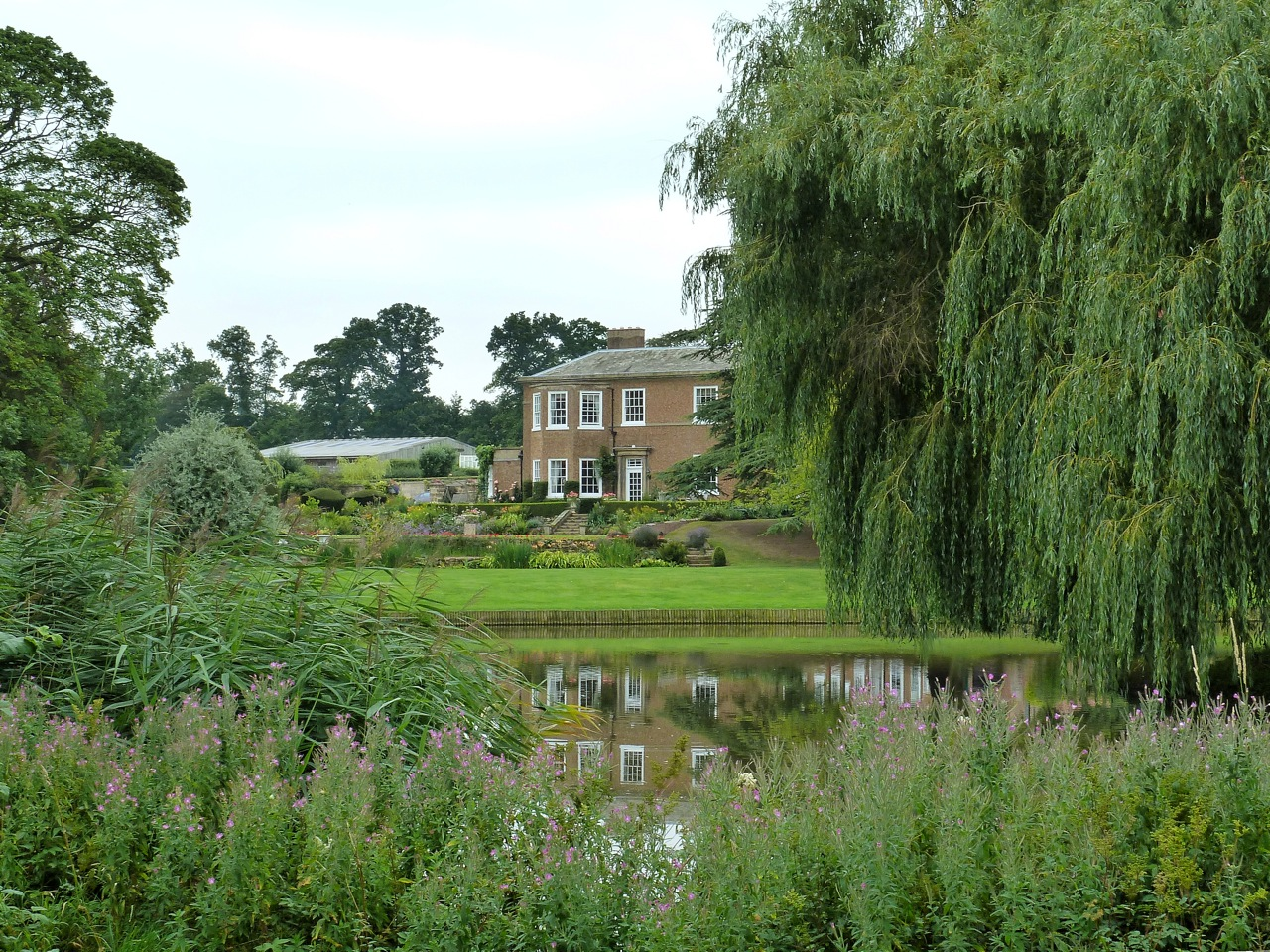
Manor House, Kirby Sigston

Kirby Sigston is a denucleated village and civil parish in North Yorkshire, England, approximately 4 miles (6.4 km) east of Northallerton. The parish is situated on the Cod Beck river, and also includes the hamlet of Jeater Houses, east of the village on the A19 road, on the boundary with Thimbleby.

== History ==
The settlement is mentioned in the Domesday Book of 1086 as having 75 ploughlands, and its name derives from a combination of the Old Norse Kirkju-býr (a village with a church) and Sigges tūn (Sigge's farmstead or settlement).

During the 14th century, the parish was part of a huge deer park and hunting area on the eastern side of what is now known as the Vale of Mowbray. A deserted medieval village (DMV) lies to the south of the church.

The village has never had a shop, post office or pub, and its school, which opened in 1846 and would teach around 35 pupils, closed in 1944.

From 1974 to 2023 it was part of the Hambleton District, it is now administered by the unitary North Yorkshire Council.

== Places of interest ==
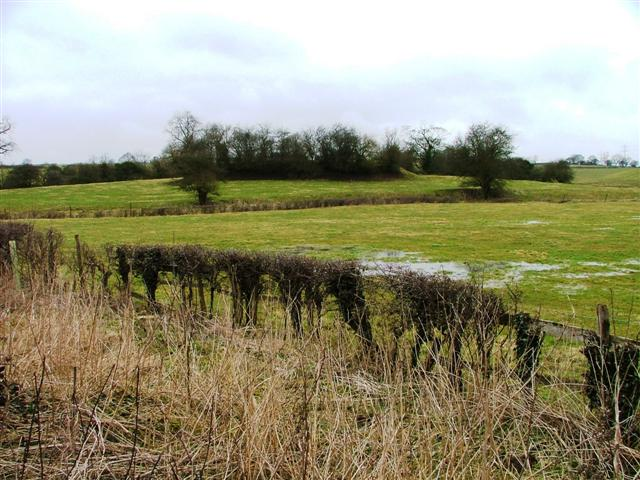
Sigston Castle; only earthworks remain

To the north is the site of Sigston Castle, a 14th-century quadrangular castle, surrounded by a now largely dry moat. South of Sigston Castle, near the grade II listed Manor House, is St Lawrence's church. The church is largely Norman but the tower was renovated in the 18th century. The grade I listed church is decorated with carvings of dragons, which Pevsner states show the Danish influence in the area.

== Population ==
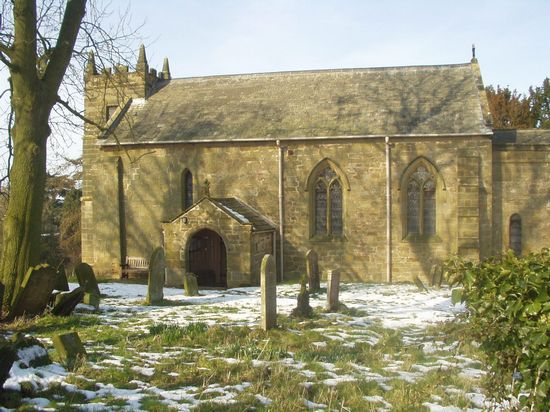
St Lawrence's Church, Kirby Sigston

The population taken at the 2011 Census was fewer than 100, so details are included in the civil parish of Winton, Stank and Hallikeld. North Yorkshire County Council estimated the population of the village in 2015 to be 100 people, an increase of ten since the 2011 census.

== Notable residents ==
The former Prime Minister of the United Kingdom, and Conservative MP for Richmond and Northallerton, Rishi Sunak, currently lives in Kirby Sigston as his constituency home.

== In popular culture ==
Kirby Sigston is referred to in The Mountain Goats' song "Going to Kirby Sigston".

== See also ==
- Listed buildings in Kirby Sigston
