= 1563 =

1563 in various calendars
- Gregorian calendar: 1563; MDLXIII
- Ab urbe condita: 2316
- Armenian calendar: 1012; ԹՎ ՌԺԲ
- Assyrian calendar: 6313
- Balinese saka calendar: 1484–1485
- Bengali calendar: 969–970
- Berber calendar: 2513
- English Regnal year: 5 Eliz. 1 – 6 Eliz. 1
- Buddhist calendar: 2107
- Burmese calendar: 925
- Byzantine calendar: 7071–7072
- Chinese calendar: 壬戌年 (Water Dog); 4260 or 4053 — to — 癸亥年 (Water Pig); 4261 or 4054
- Coptic calendar: 1279–1280
- Discordian calendar: 2729
- Ethiopian calendar: 1555–1556
- Hebrew calendar: 5323–5324
- Hindu calendars
- Vikram Samvat: 1619–1620
- Shaka Samvat: 1484–1485
- Kali Yuga: 4663–4664
- Holocene calendar: 11563
- Igbo calendar: 563–564
- Iranian calendar: 941–942
- Islamic calendar: 970–971
- Japanese calendar: Eiroku 6 (永禄６年)
- Javanese calendar: 1482–1483
- Julian calendar: 1563; MDLXIII
- Korean calendar: 3896
- Minguo calendar: 349 before ROC 民前349年
- Nanakshahi calendar: 95
- Thai solar calendar: 2105–2106
- Tibetan calendar: ཆུ་ཕོ་ཁྱི་ལོ་ (male Water-Dog); 1689 or 1308 or 536 — to — ཆུ་མོ་ཕག་ལོ་ (female Water-Boar); 1690 or 1309 or 537

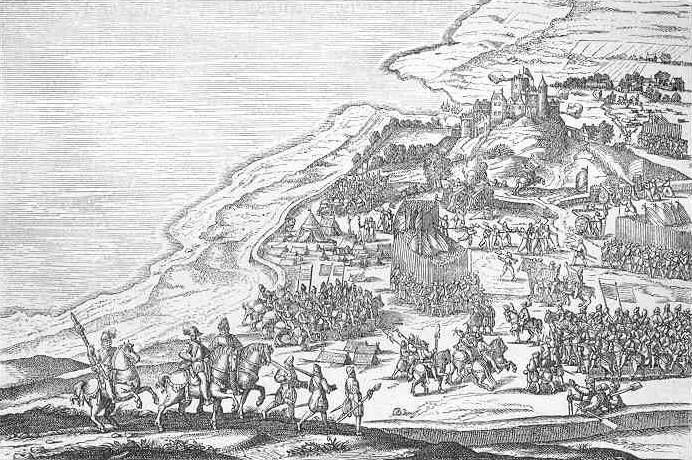
August 13: The Northern Seven Years' War begins as Denmark declares war on Sweden

Year 1563 (MDLXIII) was a common year starting on Friday of the Julian calendar.

== Events ==
=== January–March ===
- January 11 (January 2, 1563 O.S., January 11, 1563 N.S.) – The convocation of bishops and clerics of the Church of England is opened at St Paul's Cathedral in London by the Dean of the Arches, Robert Weston to agree upon the wording of what will become the Thirty-nine Articles, with the assembly adopting all but three of the Forty-two Articles promulgated during the reign of King Edward VI in 1553. The conference lasts for three months before agreeing upon the Articles to be submitted for further modification.
- January 25 – In Italy, Instituto Bancario San Paolo di Torino, a constituent of the major financial group Sanpaolo IMI, is founded.
- February 1 – Sarsa Dengel succeeds his father Menas as Emperor of Ethiopia at age 14.
- February 18 – François, Duke of Guise, is assassinated while besieging Orléans by Jean de Poltrot.
- March 19 – The Edict of Amboise is signed at the Château d'Amboise by Catherine de' Medici, acting as regent for her son Charles IX of France, having been negotiated between the Huguenot Louis I, Prince of Condé, and Anne, duc de Montmorency, Constable of France. It accords some toleration to the Huguenots, especially to aristocrats. It officially ends the first phase of the French Wars of Religion, and the combined Huguenot and royal armies then march north to besiege the English in Le Havre.

=== April–June ===
- April 5 – The English galleon ship HMS Grehound strikes a sandbar off of the coast of Rye, East Sussex and sinks with all hands in the English Channel, including the Admiral of the Narrow Seas, John Malyn.
- April 10 – Royal assent is given by Queen Elizabeth of England to parliamentary approval of multiple laws, including the Highways Act 1562 (requiring all householders in a parish to provide six days labor per year on building highways); the Poor Act 1562 (providing for fines for persons who refuse to contribute to a fund for relief of the poor); the Supremacy of the Crown Act 1562 (making refusal to swear allegiance to the monarch punishable as treason); and the Witchcraft Act 1562 (limiting the death penalty for witchcraft to cases where a defendant caused another person's death)
- April 23 – The cornerstone is laid for the construction of El Escorial, the royal palace for the monarch of Spain. Construction will not be finished for 21 more years, with completion on September 13, 1584.
- May 5 (3rd day of 4th month, Eiroku 6) – The Battle of Yudokoru takes place in Japan at the Inaba Province (now the eastern Tottori Prefecture), as Takanobu Takeda defeats the shogun Toyokazu Yamana.
- May 25 – Elizabeth College, Guernsey is founded, by order of Queen Elizabeth I of England.
- May 30 – At Bornholm, the Danish fleet fires on the Swedish navy, leading to a Danish defeat and precipitating the Northern Seven Years' War.
- June 4 – The Parliament of Scotland passes the Witchcraft Act, making both the practice of witchcraft, and the act of consulting with witches, punishable by burning at the stake.

=== July–September ===
- July 28 – The English surrender Le Havre to the French after a siege.
- August 13 – Northern Seven Years' War: Denmark–Norway and the Free City of Lübeck declare war against the Kingdom of Sweden.
- August 18 – Merchants from the Bungo Province destroy the Portuguese settlement in Yokoseura, Japan
- September 4 – Northern Seven Years' War: King Frederick II of Denmark, advancing from Halland, takes Old Älvsborg from Sweden.

=== October–December ===
- October 7 – Giovanni Battista Lercari is elected as the new Doge of the Republic of Genoa.
- November 9 – The Army of Sweden, under the command of King Eric XIV, suffers a severe defeat in the Battle of Mared against the Army of Denmark, commanded by King Frederik II. In the battle, near what is now the city of Oskarström in Sweden, the Swedes suffer at least 2,500 casualties. The Swedish Army is able to retreat and rebuild, but the Danes plunder the village of Övraby, which is never rebuilt.
- November 11 – The Council of Trent amends existing Roman Catholic canon law to deter unannounced marriages. In order for a marriage to be recognized by the Church, the names of the bride and groom are to be announced publicly in a chapel during Mass, and registered with the parish priests of both parties.
- December 4 – The Council of Trent (which had opened on December 13, 1545) officially closes. It reaffirms all major Roman Catholic doctrines, and declares the Deuterocanonical books of the Old Testament to be canonical, along with the rest of the Bible. Chapter 1, Session 24, promulgates the decree Tametsi, stipulating that for a marriage to be valid, consent (the essence of marriage) as expressed in the vows has to be given publicly before witnesses, one of whom has to be the parish priest.

== Births ==
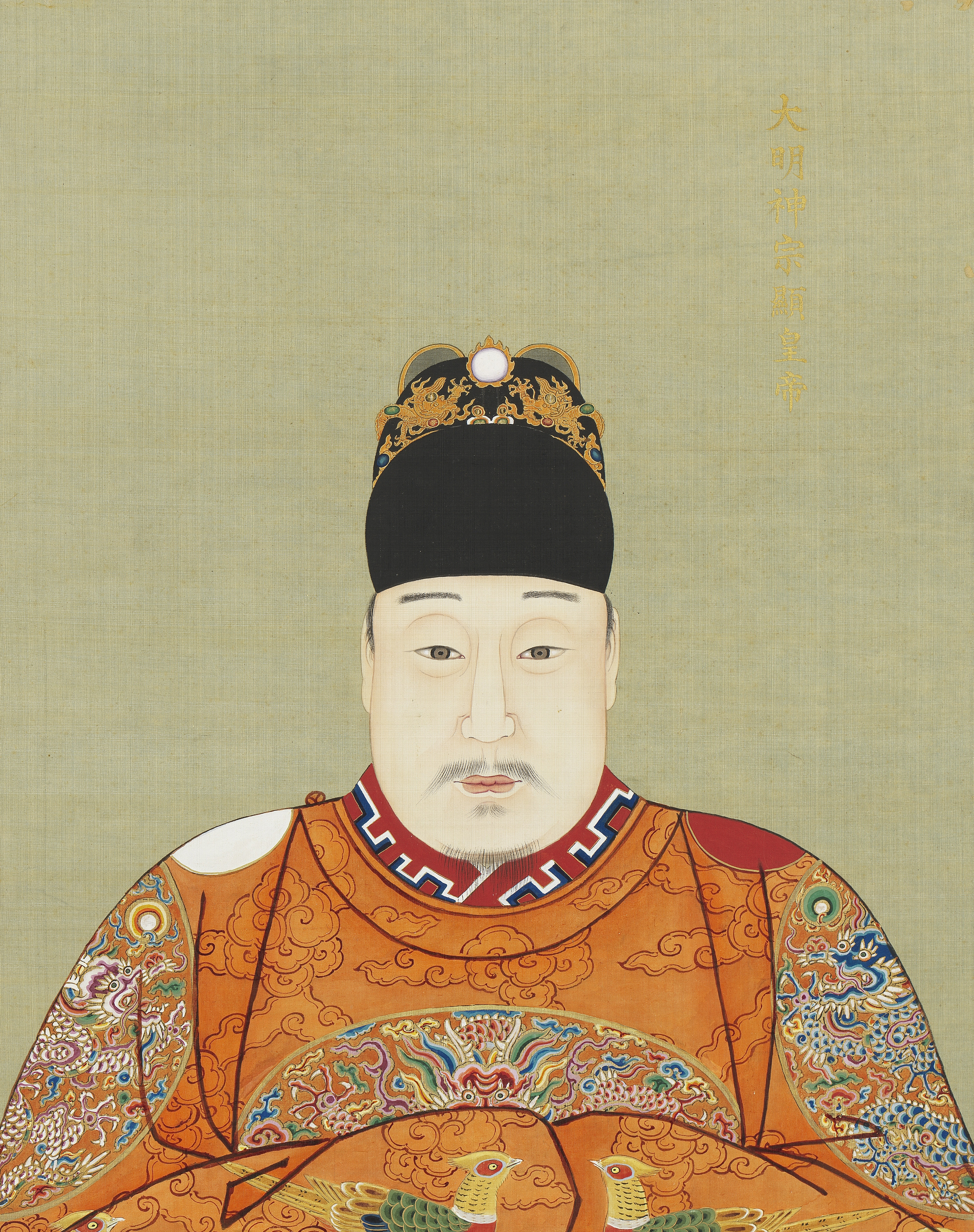
Emperor Wanli

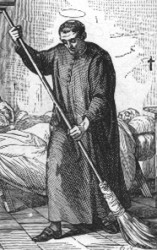
Saint Francis Caracciolo

- January – Penelope Blount, Countess of Devonshire, English noblewoman (d. 1607)
- January 6
  - Johann Christoph von Westerstetten, German bishop (d. 1637)
  - Martin Becanus, Belgian Jesuit priest (d. 1624)
- January 19 – Leonhard Hutter, German theologian (d. 1616)
- January 29 – William Slingsby, English army officer (d. 1634)
- January 30 – Franciscus Gomarus, Dutch theologian (d. 1641)
- March 5 – John Coke, English politician (d. 1644)
- March 29 – Sir Miles Sandys, 1st Baronet, English politician (d. 1645)
- April 15 – Guru Arjan Dev, fifth Sikh leader (d. 1606)
- May 9 – Frederick IV of Fürstenberg, German noble (d. 1617)
- June 1 – Robert Cecil, 1st Earl of Salisbury, English statesman and spymaster (d. 1612)
- June 4 – George Heriot, Scottish goldsmith and philanthropist (d. 1624)
- July 19 – Lamoral, 1st Prince of Ligne (d. 1624)
- September 4 – Wanli Emperor of China (d. 1620)
- September 15 – Elisabeth of Anhalt-Zerbst, Electress of Brandenburg (d. 1607)
- September 18 – Agnes of Limburg-Styrum, Abbess of Elten, Vreden, Borghorst and Freckenhorst (d. 1645)
- September 27 – Thomas Freke, English politician (d. 1633)
- September 30 – Enno III, Count of East Frisia, Count of Ostfriesland from 1599 to 1625 from the Cirksena family (d. 1625)
- October 4 – Dorothea of Saxony, Duchess of Brunswick-Wolfenbüttel (d. 1587)
- October 13 – Francis Caracciolo, Italian Catholic priest (d. 1608)
- October 14 – Jodocus Hondius, Flemish artist (d. 1633)
- October 28 – Berlinghiero Gessi, Italian Catholic cardinal (d. 1639)
- October 30 – Sophie of Brunswick-Lüneburg, Margrave of Brandenburg-Ansbach and Brandenburg-Kulmbach, Duchess of Hunters Village (d. 1639)
- November 5 – Countess Anna of Nassau (d. 1588)
- November 8 – Henry II of Lorraine (d. 1624)
- November 19 – Robert Sidney, 1st Earl of Leicester, English statesman (d. 1626)
- November 20 – Sophie of Württemberg, German noble (d. 1590)
- November 28 – Hosokawa Tadaoki, Japanese daimyō (d. 1646)
- December 2 – Mutio Vitelleschi, Italian Superior General of the Society of Jesus (d. 1645)
- December 19 – Lord William Howard, English nobleman (d. 1640)
- December 20 – Juan Fernandez Pacheco, 5th Duke of Escalona, Spanish noble and diplomat (d. 1615)
- date unknown
  - Charles Blount, 1st Earl of Devonshire (d. 1606)
  - Louise Bourgeois Boursier, French Royal midwife (d. 1636)
  - John Dowland, English composer (d. 1626)
  - Michael Drayton, English poet (d. 1631)
  - Scipione Gentili, Italian legal scholar (d. 1616)
  - Anna Guarini, Italian virtuoso singer (d. 1598)
  - Hosokawa Gracia, Japanese noblewoman (d. 1600)
  - Heo Nanseolheon, Korean poet (d. 1589)
  - Marcin Kazanowski, Polish nobleman (d. 1636)
  - Zygmunt Kazanowski, Polish nobleman (d. 1634)
  - Robert Naunton, English politician and writer (d. 1635)
  - Pedro Fernandes de Queirós, Portuguese seaman and explorer (d. 1614)
  - Mariana de Jesús Torres, Spanish nun and mystic (d. 1635)
  - Joshua Sylvester, English poet (d. 1618)
  - Jean Titelouze, French organist and composer (d. 1633)
  - Yi Su-gwang, Korean scholar (d. 1628)
  - Henri, Duke of Joyeuse, French general (d. 1608)

== Deaths ==
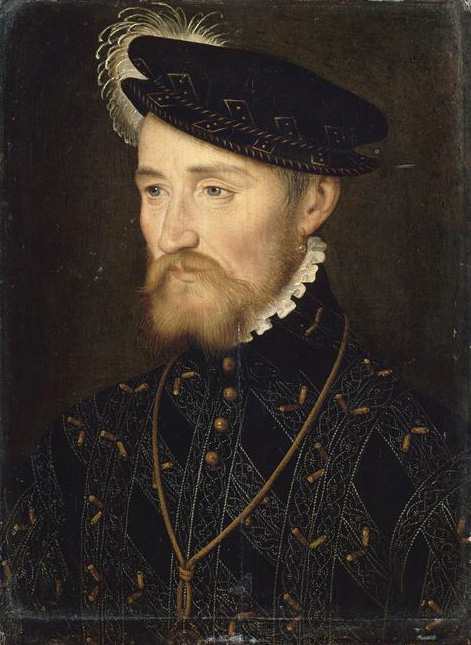
François, Duke of Guise

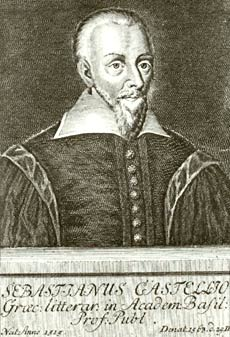
Sebastian Castellio

- January 4 – Elisabeth of Hesse, Countess Palatine of Zweibrücken, later Countess Palatine of Simmern (b. 1503)
- February 1 – Emperor Menas of Ethiopia (fever) (b. 1559)
- February 4 – Wilhelm von Brandenburg, Archbishop of Riga (b. 1498)
- February 24 – François, Duke of Guise, French soldier and politician (shot) (b. 1519)
- March 2 – Ercole Gonzaga, Spanish Catholic cardinal (b. 1505)
- March 17 – Girolamo Seripando, Italian Catholic cardinal (b. 1493)
- March 19 – Arthur Brooke, English poet
- March 24 – Hosokawa Harumoto, Japanese military leader (b. 1514)
- March 28 – Heinrich Glarean, Swiss music theorist (b. 1488)
- April 15 – Bernhard VIII, Count of Lippe (b. 1527)
- April 30 – Henry Stafford, 1st Baron Stafford, English baron (b. 1501)
- May 21 – Martynas Mažvydas, author of the first printed book in Lithuanian (b. 1510)
- June 10 – William Paget, 1st Baron Paget, English statesman (b. 1506)
- June 24 – Prince Yuri of Uglich (b. 1532)
- August 11 – Bartolomé de Escobedo, Spanish composer (b. 1500)
- August 18 – Étienne de La Boétie, French judge and writer (b. 1530)
- August 30 – Wolfgang Musculus, German theologian (b. 1497)
- September 17 – Henry Manners, 2nd Earl of Rutland, English soldier (b. 1526)
- October 31 – Anthony Kitchin, British bishop (b. 1471)
- November
  - John Bale, English churchman (b. 1495)
  - Ioan Iacob Heraclid, ruler of Moldavia (b. 1511)
- December 1 – Yi Gwang-sik, Korean politician and general (b. 1493)
- December 29
  - Sebastian Castellio, French theologian (b. 1515)
  - Thomas Naogeorgus, German playwright (b. 1508)
- date unknown
  - Odet de Selve, French diplomat (b. c. 1504)
