= Henry Palmer =

Henry Palmer may refer to:

== Politicians ==
- Henry Palmer (Leicester MP) represented Leicester (UK Parliament constituency)
- Henry Palmer (by 1496-1559), Member of Parliament for Bramber
- Henry L. Palmer (1819–1909), Wisconsin politician
- Henry W. Palmer (1839–1913), member of the U.S. House of Representatives from Pennsylvania
- Henry Palmer (Australian politician) (1821–1916), member of the Queensland Legislative Assembly
- Henry Wyndham Palmer (1826–1887), member of the Queensland Legislative Assembly

== Other people ==
- Henry Palmer (Royal Navy officer, died 1611) (1550–1611), Surveyor of the Navy from 1589 to 1598
- Henry Palmer (Royal Navy officer, born 1582) (1582–1644), Royal Navy officer
- Henry Palmer (surgeon) (1827–1895), Union Army surgeon
- Henry Robinson Palmer (1795–1844), English engineer, in 1824 produced designs for a horse-drawn suspended monorail
- Henry Spencer Palmer (1838–1893), British army military engineer and surveyor
- Henry Palmer (priest) (1741–1801), Anglican priest
- Henry Palmer (rugby union) (born 2003), Australian rugby union player

== See also ==
- Harry Palmer (disambiguation)
