= Slingsby (surname) =

Slingsby is a surname. Notable people with the surname include:

- Francis Slingsby (1569–1651), Anglo-Irish soldier of the late sixteenth century
- Fred Slingsby (1894–1973), English founder of Slingsby Sailplanes Ltd
- Guildford Slingsby (1610–1643), Irish politician
- Guylford Slingsby (1565–1631), administrator who went on to be Comptroller of the Navy
- Henry Slingsby (disambiguation), several people
- John Francis Waller (1810–1894), writer publishing magazine articles under the pseudonym of Jonathan Freke Slingsby
- John Slingsby (1788–1826), English amateur cricketer
- Mary Slingsby (fl. 1670–1685), English actress
- Slingsby Bethel (1617–1697), Member of Parliament with republican sympathies, during the period of the English Civil War
- Tom Slingsby (born 1984), Australian sailor
- William Cecil Slingsby (1849–1929), English mountain climber and alpine explorer
