= Commander-in-Chief, English Channel (Royal Navy) =

- Active: 1709-1746
- Country: United Kingdom
- Branch: Royal Navy
- Type: Squadron
- Role: Cruising, and patrolling
- Part of: Royal Navy
- Garrison/HQ: Spithead, Hampshire, England

Commanders
- Notable commanders: Admiral Sir John Norris

The Commander-in-Chief, English Channel or formally Commander-in-Chief, of His Majesty's Ships in the Channel was a senior commander of the Royal Navy. The Spithead Station was a name given to the units, establishments, and staff operating under the post from 1709 to 1746. Following Admiral Lord Anson new appointment as Commander-in-Chief, English Channel this office was amalgamated with the office of Commander-in-Chief, Portsmouth.

== History ==
Initially the English Navy had organized its fleet into sub-commands namely squadrons from at least 1205 and certainly during the 16th century. A channel squadron was operating out of Portsmouth from around 1512. By 1560 The Navy Royal had three functioning squadrons one in the Channel, and the Irish Sea and another in the North Sea. From 1509 until 1649 Vice-Admirals commanding particular fleets were styled so as to denote he was junior to the Lord Admiral of England these flag officers were formally appointed by the crown. From 1709 the Channel Squadron was coordinated out of Spithead, Hampshire, England under the command of Sir John Norris. In 1715 Norris was reassigned to command the British Baltic Fleet and sent to the Baltic Sea to support a coalition of naval forces from Russia, Denmark and Hanover taking in the Great Northern War. In 1729 Admiral Norris returned to the Spithead Station for a second tenure as CINC. In March 1744 he resigned his post over the Admiralty's attempts to override his authority in setting strategy in response to renewed hostilities against France. Following Admiral Norris's resignation the station was then commanded by Sir John Balchen until 1746 when the Admiralty issued orders to centralize all existing naval commands in the English Channel including Spithead and those at the Downs, Narrow Seas, Portsmouth, and Plymouth, to be under the control of Admiral Lord Anson then the Commander-in-Chief, Western Squadron. He then assumed the post of Commander-in-Chief, English Channel, The Spithead Station was then merged with Portsmouth Station.

=== Commander-in-Chief, English Channel ===
- Vice-Admiral, Sir John Norris, 5 March 1709 – 1715.
- Vice-Admiral, James Berkeley, 3rd Earl of Berkeley, 1719. (as C-in-C, British Channel Fleet)
- Admiral Sir John Norris, 1729-1744 (second time - appoint adm. of the fleet and c.-in-c. then resigned)
- Admiral Sir John Balchen, 14 July 1744

== Sources ==
- Archives, The National. "Commission and Warrant Book". discovery.nationalarchives.gov.uk. National Archives UK, ADM 6/16 4 January 1742 – 18 September 1745.
- Baumber, Michael (1989). General-at-sea : Robert Blake and the seventeenth-century revolution in naval warfare (1. publ. ed.). London: J. Murray. ISBN 9780719547065.
- Beatson, Robert (1804). Naval and Military Memoirs of Great Britain, from 1727 to 1783. London, England: Longman, Hurst, Rees and Orme.
- Corbett, Julian Stafford (1917). "The Navy of Elizabeth". Drake and the Tudor navy, with a history of the rise of England as a maritime power. London, England: London : Longmans, Green.
- Harrison, Simon. "Commander-in-Chief at English Channel". threedecks.org. S. Harrison 2010-2018.
- Heathcote, T.A. (2002). The British Admirals of the Fleet : 1734-1995 : a biographical dictionary (1. publ. in Great Britain. ed.). Barnsley: Cooper.ISBN 0850528356.
- Knighton, edited by C.S.; Loades, David (2011). The Navy of Edward VI and Mary I. Farnham, Surrey: Ashgate for the Navy Records Society. ISBN 9781409418474.
- Laughton, John Knox. "Howard, Edward (1477?-1513)" . In Lee, Sidney (ed.). Dictionary of National Biography. Vol. 28. London: Smith, Elder & Co. pp. 10–11.
- "NORRIS, Sir John (c.1671-1749), of Benenden, Kent, and St. Paul's, Covent Garden, London | History of Parliament Online". www.historyofparliamentonline.org. The History of Parliament Trust 1964-2017.
- Palmer, Michael A. (2005). Command at Sea: Naval Command and Control Since the Sixteenth Century. Harvard, Mass, USA: Harvard University Press. ISBN 9780674016811.
- Runyan, Timothy J. (1987). Ships, Seafaring, and Society: Essays in Maritime History. Detroit, Michigan, USA: Wayne State University Press. ISBN 0814319912.
- Stewart, William (2009). Admirals of the World: A Biographical Dictionary, 1500 to the Present. McFarland. ISBN 9780786438099.
