= Henry Slingsby =

Henry Slingsby may refer to:

- Henry Slingsby (died 1634) (1560–1634), MP
- Sir Henry Slingsby, 1st Baronet (1602–1658), English Royalist landowner and Member of Parliament
- Henry Slingsby (Master of the Mint) (1621–1690), Master of the Mint 1662–1680
- Henry Slingsby (1638–1701), MP for Portsmouth and Lieutenant-Governor of Portsmouth
- Sir Henry Slingsby, 3rd Baronet (1660–1691) of the Slingsby baronets, MP for Knaresborough
- Sir Henry Slingsby, 5th Baronet (1695–1763) of the Slingsby baronets, MP for Knaresborough

== See also ==
- Slingsby (disambiguation)
