= Harry Palmer (disambiguation) =

Harry Palmer is the name given to a fictional intelligence officer in a number of films based on based on the books of Len Deighton, in which he is unnamed

Harry Palmer may also refer to:

- Harry Palmer (actor) (c.1889–1962), American vaudeville actor
- Harry Palmer (animator), American animator
- Harry Palmer (photographer) (born 1930), Canadian photographer
- Harry J. Palmer (1872–1948), New York politician
- Harry Palmer, founder of the Avatar Course
- Harry Palmer, the first husband of Olive Diefenbaker
- Harry Palmer, American musician, guitar player with Ford Theatre (band)
- Harry Palmer, American record label executive and uncle of R. Stevie Moore

== See also ==
- Henry Palmer (disambiguation)
