= Reverend James Smith =

Reverend James Smith may refer to:

- James Smith, character in the Chinua Achebe novel Things Fall Apart
- James Smith (archbishop of St. Andrews and Edinburgh) (1841–1928), Roman Catholic archbishop in Scotland
- James Smith (archdeacon of Barnstaple) (died 1667), Archdeacon of Barnstaple
- James Smith (Vicar Apostolic of the Northern District) (1645–1711), English Roman Catholic vicar-apostolic

== See also ==
- James Smith (disambiguation)
