= Sir Robert Slingsby, 1st Baronet =

English baronet, author and Naval commander

Sir Robert Slingsby, 1st Baronet (1611–1661) was an English baronet, writer and Naval commander, and in his last years a much-loved colleague of Samuel Pepys.

He was born at Bifrons near Canterbury, the second son of Sir Guylford Slingsby, Controller of the Navy, and Margaret Walter. He was the grandson of Sir Francis Slingsby of Scriven, near Knaresborough, and thus a first cousin of Sir Henry Slingsby, 1st Baronet, who was executed in 1658 for his part in a conspiracy to restore Charles II. Robert's eldest brother Guildford Slingsby was a promising young politician and lawyer who was killed early in the English Civil War.

== Early career ==
He entered the Navy as a boy and when he was only 22 was given his first command, the Eighth Lyon's Whelp; in 1636 he commanded the Third Lyon's Whelp, and then the Expedition, in which he transported arms from the Tower of London to Edinburgh in 1640. He then commanded a small squadron in the English Channel, and in 1642 he escorted the Portuguese Ambassador to Lisbon in the Garland.

On the outbreak of the Civil War, he declared for Charles I, but his men mutinied and he was imprisoned. On his release he joined the King at Oxford and in 1644 he went to the Continent to raise funds for the Royalist cause. He returned to England: he and his brother Walter were with Prince Rupert when he surrendered Bristol, then they went to Brussels to join their brother Arthur, who in 1658 was created the first of the Slingsby baronets of Bifrons. Robert returned to England, and in 1650, like many defeated Royalists, he compounded i.e. paid a fine in return for being left with sufficient means to live on. According to his sister Dorothy Nightingale, he was then living with their widowed mother at York. Robert was then described as being "infirm and wounded, and not likely to live long".

== Restoration ==
At the Restoration he was given his father's old office of Comptroller of the Navy, and was created the first and last of the Slingsby baronets of Newcells. He had already presented the King with his book "The Past and Present State of His Majesty's Navy" which argued for regular payment of sailors' wages, prohibition of private trading in goods by Naval officers and the encouragement of merchant shipping. Samuel Pepys praised the great efforts Slingsby had taken over the book, but added drily that he had too high an opinion of his own work.

Despite such occasional jibes, a warm friendship sprung up between Slingsby and Pepys: Slingsby invited Pepys regularly to his house, read him his verses, and drew on his own experience of the Navy in Charles I's time to explain how Pepys' own office, the Clerk of the Acts, had been performed then. Bryant remarks that Pepys respected Slingsby as he could never respect most of his other colleagues like Sir William Batten.

== Death ==
Slingsby did not enjoy office for long: on 22 October 1661 Pepys noted that he was sick with ague and fever (an intermittent fever which killed several thousand people in London in 1661–4), and on 24 October he 'continued ill, which makes them all afeared for him'. He died on 26 October to Pepys' grief: 'he being a man that had loved me and had many qualities that made me love him above all the officers and Commissioners in the Navy'. Pepys was distressed that there was no memorial service, which he regarded as a deliberate slight on Slingsby's memory from hostile colleagues like Batten and Sir William Penn, who in Pepys' opinion had regarded Slingsby's integrity as a check on their own greed and ambition. Both Batten and Penn professed grief at Slingsby's death, but Pepys dismissed them as a pair of hypocrites.

== Marriage ==
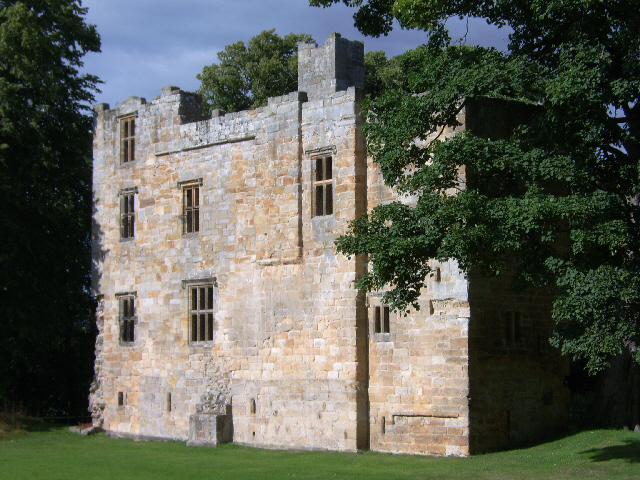
Dilston Castle, the family home of Slingsby's second wife, Elizabeth Radclyffe

He married firstly Elizabeth Brooke, only daughter and heiress of Robert Brooke of Newcells, Hertfordshire and Joan Prannell. He married secondly Elizabeth Radclyffe, daughter of Sir Edward Radclyffe, 2nd Baronet of Dilston Castle, Northumberland and Elizabeth Barton; Lady Slingsby was the sister of Francis Radclyffe, 1st Earl of Derwentwater and widow of Sir William Fenwick of Meldon. Pepys praised Slingsby's second wife as a "good woman". He had no son and his title died with him; according to Pepys, he had at least one daughter, of whom little seems to be known.

Military offices
Preceded by Vice-Admiral Sir George Carteret	Comptroller of the Navy; 1660–1661	Succeeded by Vice-Admiral, Sir John Mennes
Baronetage of England
New creation	Baronet (of Newcells); 1660–1661	Extinct
