= Slingsby =

Slingsby may refer to:

== People ==
- Slingsby (surname)
- Slingsby Baronets

== Places ==
- Slingsby, North Yorkshire
- Slingsby Channel, a strait in the Queen Charlotte Strait region of the Central Coast of British Columbia, Canada

== Other uses ==
- Slingsby Aviation, formerly Slingsby Sailplanes, a manufacturer of gliders and other aircraft
