= HMS Henry =

Ship of the line of the Royal Navy

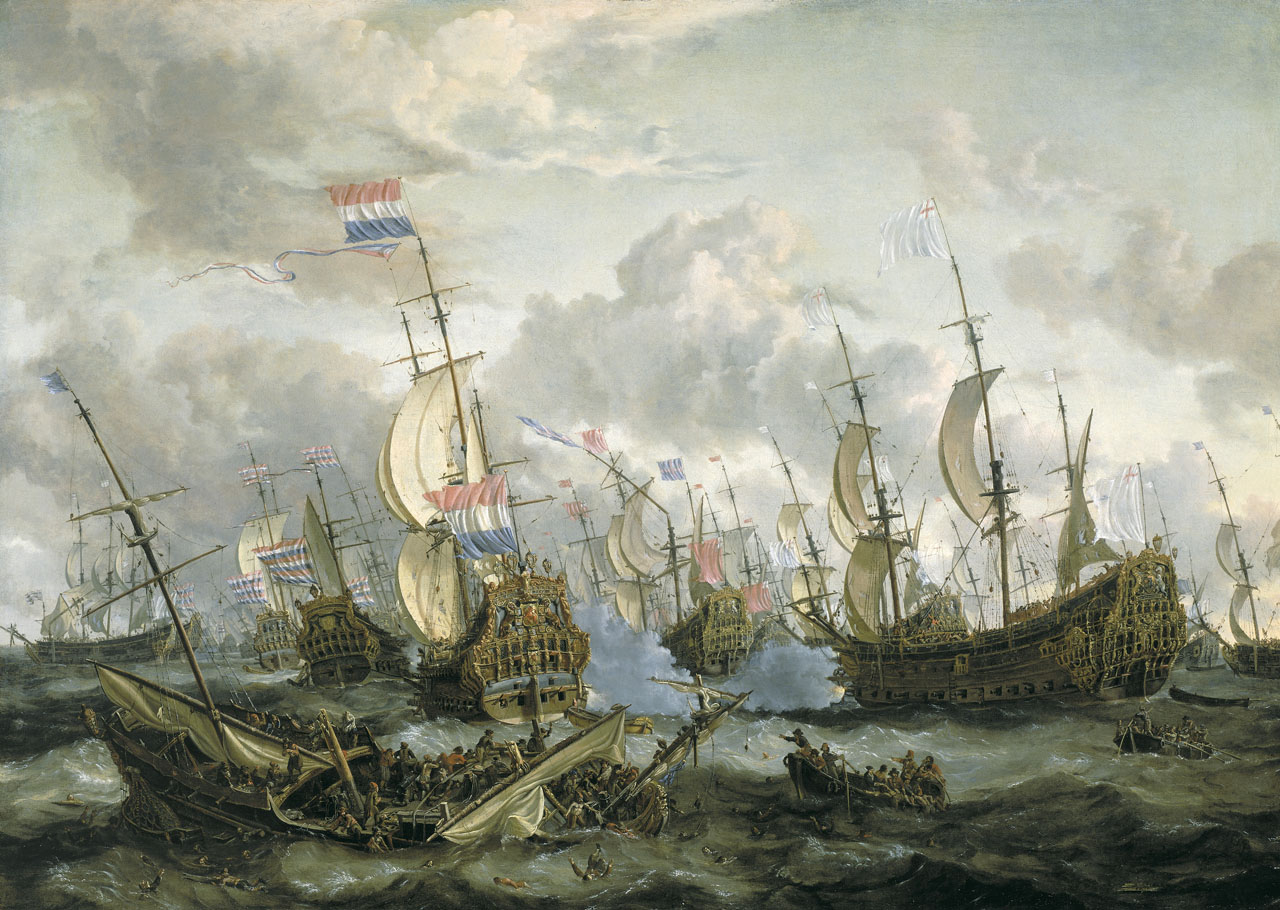
- HMS Henry at the Four Days' Battle in 1666

History

Commonwealth of England
- Name: Dunbar
- Ordered: 3 July 1654
- Builder: Manley Callis, Deptford Dockyard
- Launched: 1656
- Renamed: HMS Henry, 1660

History

England
- Name: HMS Henry
- Fate: Accidentally burnt, 16 May 1682

General characteristics
- Class & type: 64-gun Second rate ship of the line
- Tons burthen: 1,04676/94 originally, later 1,08181/94
- Length: 123 ft (37.5 m) originally, later 124 ft (37.8 m) (keel)
- Beam: 40 ft 0 in (12.2 m) originally, later 40 ft 6 in (12.3 m)
- Depth of hold: 17 ft (5.2 m)
- Propulsion: Sails
- Sail plan: Full-rigged ship
- Armament: 64 guns (1660); 82 guns (1677)

The Dunbar was a 64-gun second rate ship of the line of the Commonwealth of England, originally built at Deptford, and launched in 1656. Taken into the English Royal Navy and renamed HMS Henry in 1660, she served until 1682, when she was lost in an accidental fire.

== Description ==
The full-rigged ship as built was 123 ft (37.5 m) long on the keel, with a beam of 40 ft 0 in (12.2 m) and a depth of 17 ft (5.2 m), resulting in a burthen measurement of 1,04676/94 BM tons. She was later re-measured was 124 ft (37.8 m) long, with a beam of 40 ft 6 in (12.3 m) and a depth of 17 ft (5.2 m); her builder's old measurement was then 1,08181/94 tons. By 1677 her armament had been increased to 82 guns.

== Service ==
The Dunbar was one of four Second rates ordered by the Council of State on 3 July 1654 as part of the 1654 Construction Programme; she was built by Master Shipwright Manley Callis at Deptford Dockyard, Kent and launched in about May 1656 for the Navy of the Commonwealth of England. She had 13 pairs of gunports on the lower deck (one pair unused), 12 pairs on the middle deck, and 10 pairs on the upper deck (3 pairs forward and 7 pairs aft of the waist, where she lacked gunports); she also eventually had 5 more pairs on the quarterdeck, including one pair abaft the quarter-gallery. She was first fitted with 64 guns, comprising 12 demi-cannon and 12 culverins on the lower deck, 12 culverins and 12 demi-culverins on the middle deck, and 16 more demi-culverins on the upper deck (which was only partially armed in the waist at that date); later additional guns were added on what became a fully-armed upper deck, and more additional guns on the quarterdeck. After the Restoration of the monarchy in 1660, she was renamed HMS Henry.

In 1661/1662 HMS Henry was the flagship of Admiral John Mennes taking the Earl of Peterborough and the first troops of the new Garrison to occupy English Tangier, returning to England accompanying the Earl of Sandwich and the new Queen Catherine of Braganza. During the Second Anglo-Dutch War HMS Henry took part in the Battle of Lowestoft on 3 June 1665 as the flagship of Vice-Admiral Sir George Ayscue, in the Four Days' Battle of 1–4 June 1666 as the flagship of Rear-Admiral Sir John Harman (when she was severely damaged), and in the St James Day Battle on 25 July 1666 as the flagship of Rear-Admiral Sir Robert Holmes. On 13 June 1667, during the Raid on the Medway, HMS Henry was driven ashore at Rochester Bridge, Kent, but recommissioned after repairs on 6 April 1668.

During the Third Anglo-Dutch War the Henry took part in the Battle of Solebay on 28 May 1672, in the two Battles of Schooneveld on 28 May and 4 June 1673, and in the Battle of Texel on 31 August 1673. She was accidentally burnt at Chatham Dockyard on 16 May 1682.
