= Channel Squadron (England) =

- Flag of the Navy Royal 1485 to 1603
- Active: 1512–1649
- Country: England Kingdom of England
- Type: Squadron
- Role: Cruising, and patrolling
- Part of: Navy Royal
- Garrison/HQ: Portsmouth, Hampshire, England; Plymouth, Devon, England

Commanders
- First: Vice-Admiral Sir Edward Howard
- Last: Vice-Admiral Sir William Batten
- Notable commanders: Vice-Admiral, Sir William Howard, 1st Baron Howard of Effingham; Vice-Admiral Sir Francis Drake

The Channel Squadron also referred to as the Western Squadron (1512-1649) was a series of temporary naval formations first formed in under the English Tudor Navy Royal during the sixteenth century. Later during the Interregnum a channel squadron was formed as part of the Commonwealth Navy. During the 18th century as part of the Royal Navy.

The squadron was usually commanded by the Vice-Admiral in the Channel.

== History ==
Initially the English Navy had organised its fleet into sub-commands namely squadrons from at least 1205. and certainly during the 16th century. A channel squadron was operating out of Portsmouth from around 1523. By 1560 The Navy Royal had four functioning squadrons one in the Channel (Western), and the Irish Sea, Narrow Seas (Eastern) and another in the North Sea. During the Spanish Armada campaign a detached Western squadron was reassigned from the main English Fleet and sent to Plymouth under the command of Vice-Admiral Sir Francis Drake. From 1509 until 1649 Vice-Admirals commanding particular fleets or squadrons were styled so as to denote they were junior to the Lord Admiral of England these flag officers were formally appointed by the crown.

From 1709 the Channel Squadron of the Royal Navy was administered and controlled out of Spithead, Hampshire, England under the command of Sir John Norris.

== In Command ==
The Vice-Admiral in the Channel was senior appointment of the Navy Royal created in 1512 as a subordinate commander to the Lord Admiral of England. The post holder commanded the Channel Squadron until 1649.

The office was created in 1512 as a subordinate commander to the Lord Admiral of England. By 1560 there were four Vice-Admirals in the English Navy commanding naval formations.

1. Vice-Admiral Sir Edward Howard, 1512–1514.
2. Vice-Admiral, William FitzWilliam, 1523–1524. (also V.Adm at the downs/narrow seas)
3. Vice-Admiral Sir George Carew, 1544–1545.
4. Vice-Admiral, Sir William Howard, 1st Baron Howard of Effingham, May 1545.
5. Vice-Admiral, William Wynter, 1545–1547.
6. Vice-Admiral, John Clere, 1548. (c-in-c, channel and on patrol).
7. Vice-Admiral Sir Ralph Chamberlain 1556–October 1558.
8. Vice-Admiral Sir William Woodhouse, October 1558 - January 1559
9. Vice-Admiral Sir Francis Drake, 1588–1589.
10. Rear-Admiral, Sir Robert Mansell, 1600–1601
11. Vice-Admiral, Sir Robert Mansell, 1603–1604.
12. Vice-Admiral, Sir Edward Cecil 1625
13. Vice-Admiral Sir Robert Devereux, 3rd Earl of Essex, 1626-?
14. Vice-Admiral, Sir Thomas Rainsborough, May–June 1648 (also vadm narrow seas)
15. Vice-Admiral Sir William Batten, June 1648 - 1649

== Bibliography ==
- Corbett, Julian Stafford (1917). "The Navy of Elizabeth". Drake and the Tudor navy, with a history of the rise of England as a maritime power. London, England: London : Longmans, Green.
- Hammer, Paul E. J. (2003). Elizabeth's Wars: War, Government and Society in Tudor England, 1544-1604. London: Macmillan International Higher Education. ISBN 9780230629769.
- Martin, Colin (1999). The Spanish Armada: Revised Edition. Manchester: Manchester University Press. ISBN 9781901341140.
- Rodger, N.A.M. (1997). "Social History of Officers 1509-1603". The safeguard of the sea : a naval history of Britain. Vol 1., 660–1649. London, England: Penguin. ISBN 9780140297249.
- Rose, Susan (2013). "3:The Navy of England understanding the resources of the crown". England's Medieval Navy 1066-1509: Ships, Men & Warfare. Barnsley, England: Seaforth Publishing. ISBN 9781473853546.
- Runyan, Timothy J. (1987). Ships, Seafaring, and Society: Essays in Maritime History. Detroit, Michigan, USA: Wayne State University Press. ISBN 0814319912.
