= Henry Palmer (Royal Navy officer, born 1582) =

Vice-Admiral Sir Henry Palmer
- Born: 1582
- Died: 1644 (aged 61–62)
- Military career
- Allegiance: England
- Branch: Royal Navy
- Rank: Vice-Admiral

Vice-Admiral Sir Henry Palmer (1582–1644) was a Royal Navy officer who went on to be Comptroller of the Navy.

== Naval career ==
Born the son of Rear-Admiral Sir Henry Palmer, Palmer joined the Royal Navy and, following the Cádiz Expedition in 1625 was in command in the Downs. He was appointed Comptroller of the Navy in 1632. In 1642 he was ordered by Sir John Penington, acting as King Charles's representative, to transfer the fleet to Scarborough but Palmer was too frail to understand and the fleet was taken by the parliamentary forces. He died two years later. He lived at Howletts in Kent.
