= Francis Caracciolo =

Italian Catholic saint

Saint Francis Caracciolo
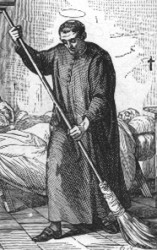
- Saint Francis Caracciolo

Confessor
- Born: October 13, 1563; Villa Santa Maria, Province of Chieti, Region of Abruzzo, Kingdom of Naples (modern-day Italy)
- Died: June 4, 1608 (aged 44); Agnone, Province of Isernia, Region of Molise, Kingdom of Italy
- Venerated in: Catholic Church
- Beatified: June 4, 1769, Rome by Pope Clement XIV
- Canonized: May 24, 1807, Rome by Pope Pius VII
- Major shrine: Church of Santa Maria di Monteverginella, Naples
- Feast: June 4
- Patronage: Naples (Italy), Italian cooks

Francis Caracciolo (October 13, 1563 – June 4, 1608), born Ascanio dei Caracciolo Pisquizi, was an Italian Catholic priest who co-founded the Order of the Clerics Regular Minor with John Augustine Adorno and Fabrizio Caracciolo. He decided to adopt a religious life at the age of 22.

== Early life and career ==
Francis (Francesco) Caracciolo was born in Villa Santa Maria in the Abruzzo region, in the Kingdom of Naples. He belonged to the Pisquizio branch of the Caracciolo family and received in baptism the name of Ascanio. From a young age, he had a reputation for gentleness and uprightness. When he was 22, he was attacked by one of the several skin maladies collectively described as "leprosy" in those days. So serious was this attack that he was considered hopeless. With death so near, he made a vow that if he regained his health, he would spend the rest of his life in the service of God and his fellow men. He recovered so quickly after this vow, that his cure was considered miraculous. Eager to fulfil his promise to God, he went to Naples to study for the priesthood.

== Order of Clerics Regular Minor ==
Five years after he went to Naples, a letter from Giovanni Agostino Adorno of Genoa to another Caracciolo, Fabrizio, begging him to take part in founding a new religious institute, was delivered by mistake to the newly ordained priest, and he saw in this circumstance an assurance of the divine will towards him (1588). He assisted in drawing up rules for the new congregation, which was approved by Pope Sixtus V, July 1, 1588, and confirmed by Pope Gregory XIV on February 18, 1591, and reconfirmed by Pope Clement VIII on June 1, 1592.

The institute founded thereby, named the Order of the Clerics Regular Minor (the "Adorno Fathers"), is both contemplative and active. Circular adoration of the Blessed Sacrament is one of the pillars of their life. To the three usual vows a fourth is added, namely, that its members must not aspire to ecclesiastical dignities outside the order nor seek them within it. Perpetual adoration of the Blessed Sacrament is kept up by rotation, and self-mortification is practiced. The motto of the order "Ad majorem Resurgentis gloriam" ("to the greater glory of the Risen One") was chosen because Francis and Augustine Adorno made their profession at Naples on Low Sunday, April 9, 1589. Upon making his profession, Caracciolo took the name Francis in honor of Francis of Assisi.

The new congregation of the Clerics Regular Minor thus established was one of considerable severity. The clerics bound themselves to various practices of daily penance. It was decided that each day one brother should fast on bread and water, another would take the discipline, and a third would wear the hair shirt. Later (under the direction of Caracciolo) it was further decreed that everyone should spend an hour a day in prayer before the Blessed Sacrament.

Caracciolo was ordained either on June 16 or September 22, 1590. None of his early biographers relayed the date of his ordination, so the date can only be deduced by a letter to Adorno dated October 27, 1590, where he writes, "I still cannot hear confessions, since one needs dispensation to do it before the six months after ordination." Since at the time ordinations could only occur on a Saturday of Ember days, he could only have been ordained on June 16 or September 22.

== Superior General, 1593-1601 ==
The order's principal founder, Giovanni Adorno, died in early 1593, and despite his refusal, Francis Caracciolo was chosen Superior General on March 9, 1593, in the first house of the congregation in Naples, called St. Mary Major or Pietrasanta, given to the congregation by Pope Sixtus V. Even in his capacity as superior of the order, he insisted on sharing simple tasks: sweeping rooms, making beds, washing dishes. As a priest Francis spent many hours in the confessional. Here he was enriched with the gifts of prophecy and the reading of hearts. He also begged in the streets for the poor and gave away most of his possessions to the needy. But it was his devotion to the Blessed Sacrament for which Francis Caracciolo is most noted and remembered. Such was his love for the Holy Eucharist, that he would spend almost the entire night in adoration. The little sleep he allowed himself was often spent on one of the altar steps.

He made three journeys to Spain to establish foundations under the protection of kings Philip II and Philip III. He opened the house of the Holy Ghost at Madrid on January 20, 1599, that of Our Lady of the Annunciation at Valladolid on September 9, 1601, and that of St. Joseph at Alcalá sometime in 1601, for teaching science. In Rome he obtained possession of St. Leonard's Church, which he afterwards exchanged for that of Sant'Agnese in Agone, September 18, 1598, and later he secured for the institute the church of San Lorenzo in Lucina (June 11, 1606) which was made over to him by a papal bull of Pope Paul V (which was, however, annulled by the bull "Susceptum" of Pope Pius X, November 9, 1906).

Francis Caracciolo was the author of "Le sette stazioni sopra la Passione di N.S. Gesù Christo" (The Seven Stations of the Passion of Our Lord, Jesus Christ, Rome, 1710). He loved the poor. Like Thomas Aquinas, a relative on his mother's side, his purity was angelic, according to the Catholic Encyclopedia. Pope Paul V desired to confer an important bishopric on him, but he steadfastly refused it.

== Latter years, 1601–1608 ==
Remaining general superior for seven years, Francis at last obtained permission from Pope Clement VIII to resign. The position had been a severe strain upon him, not only because of his delicate health, but also because in establishing and extending the order, he found himself and his brethren faced with opposition, misrepresentation, and sometimes by malicious calumnies.

Francis was then named prior of Santa Maria Maggiore and novice-master. He carried on his apostolic work in the confessional and in the pulpit, discoursing so constantly and movingly on the divine goodness to man that he was called "The Preacher of the Love of God". Hagiographies describe him as performing many miraculous healings with the sign of the cross.

He often bathed the ground with his tears when he prayed, according to his custom, prostrate on his face before the tabernacle, and constantly repeating from psalm 68, as one devoured by internal fire,"Zelus domus tuae comedit me", "Zeal for your house consumes me."

In 1608, Caracciolo moved to Agnone to found a religious house in honour of the Santissima Annunziata, but he died before the completion of his dream. After the death his remains were transported from, where he moved to found was died, to Naples, without having any visible signs of embalmment.

Invited by the Oratorians at Agnone, in the Molise region, to convert their house into a college for his congregation, Francis set out to help with the new foundation. On his way he visited Loreto, where he was granted the favor of spending the night in prayer in the chapel of the Holy House, the Basilica della Santa Casa. As he was invoking Our Lady's help on behalf of his brethren, Giovanni Adorno appeared to him in a dream or a vision, and announced his approaching death. He arrived at Agnone apparently in good health, but he himself was under no illusion. On the first day of June, 1608, he was seized with a fever which rapidly increased, and he dictated a fervent letter urging the members of the society to remain faithful to the rule. On the Vigil of Corpus Christi, Wednesday, June 4, 1608, he seemed absorbed in meditation until an hour before sunset when he suddenly cried out, "Let us go, Let us go to heaven!" Shortly after saying this, he died. He was 44 years old.

== Veneration ==
When his body was opened after death, Francis' heart was found as it were burnt up, and these words imprinted around it: "Zelus domus Tuæ comedit me"—"The zeal of Thy house hath consumed me." Francis Caracciolo was beatified by Pope Clement XIV on June 4, 1769, and canonized by Pope Pius VII on May 24, 1807. His liturgical feast day is June 4. In 1838 he was chosen as a patron saint of Naples, where his body lies. At first he was buried in the Basilica of St. Mary Major, but his remains were afterwards translated to the church of Santa Maria di Monteverginella, which was given in exchange to the Clerics Regular Minor (1823) after their suppression at the time of the French Revolution.

Francis is also the patron saint of Italian cooks.

== See also ==
- Catholic Church in Italy
- List of Catholic saints
- Saint Francis Caracciolo, patron saint archive
