= William Borough =

- Born: 1536
- Died: 1599 (aged 62–63)
- Military career
- Allegiance: England
- Branch: Royal Navy
- Commands: Bonavolia

William Borough (1536–1599) was an English naval officer who was Comptroller of the Navy and the younger brother of Stephen Borough. He participated in the British attack on Cádiz in 1587. He was responsible for the drawing of several early maps including one of Russia.

== Early life ==
Borough was born at Borough House, Northam Burrows, Northam, Devon, and his childhood experiences of voyages were those accompanying his older brother Stephen Borough and their uncle John Borough. In 1580 Borough was appointed Comptroller of the Navy, which post he shared initially with William Holstocke. In June 1583 he took ten pirate ships into custody and ensured that all ten masters were hanged at Wapping. In 1587 he sailed with Sir Francis Drake and was indicted for mutiny and cowardice but later acquitted and given command of the galley Bonavolia.

== Family ==
In 1571 he married Judith Jones; they had one son and one daughter. He later married Lady Jane Wentworth.

== Works ==
- A Discourse of the Variation of the Cumpas or Magneticall Needle (1581) – Internet Archive (bound with New Attractive by Robert Norman)

Military offices
Preceded by Vice-Admiral William Holstocke	Comptroller of the Navy; 1580–1598	Succeeded by Sir Henry Palmer
