= John Hopton (naval administrator) =

English naval officer and naval administrator

- Born: c. 1470; England
- Died: 1524; England
- Military career
- Allegiance: England
- Branch: Royal Navy
- Service years: 1512–1524
- Rank: Captain
- Commands: Clerk Comptroller of the Navy

John Hopton (c. 1470 – 1524) was an English naval officer and naval administrator who was appointed the first Clerk Comptroller of the Navy (1512–1524). He was one of the Clerks of His Majesty's Kings Marine who served under King Henry VIII of England.

== Career ==
John Hopton was a gentleman usher of chamber of King Henry VIII, whom he served as both a naval officer and naval administrator. The King had ordered the construction of new dockyards at Erith and Limehouse, both in Kent, England as the Navy Royal was expanding. The workload of the Clerk of King's Ships, Robert Brygandine. was becoming too much for one official to handle and this led to the creation of a new office: in February 1512 Hopton was appointed Clerk Comptroller of the Navy. The King ordered the construction of new storehouses at Deptford and Erith, and in 1513 Hopton was also appointed Keeper of the Kings Storehouse at both those dockyards. Sharing responsibility with Brygandine, he had responsibility for ships and stores in the Thames and Medway area, whilst Brygandine was responsible for Portsmouth and Southampton. Hopton held all these offices simultaneously until 1524.

On 26 May 1513, Henry VIII appointed him Captain of the Fleet to carry the King's army to Calais, which later led to the Battle of the Spurs at which he commanded the troopships.

From 1512 until his death in 1524, Hopton became the most prominent person in naval administration, responsible for almost all naval expenditure.
