= Guildford Slingsby =

Politician and Royalist

Guilford Slingsby
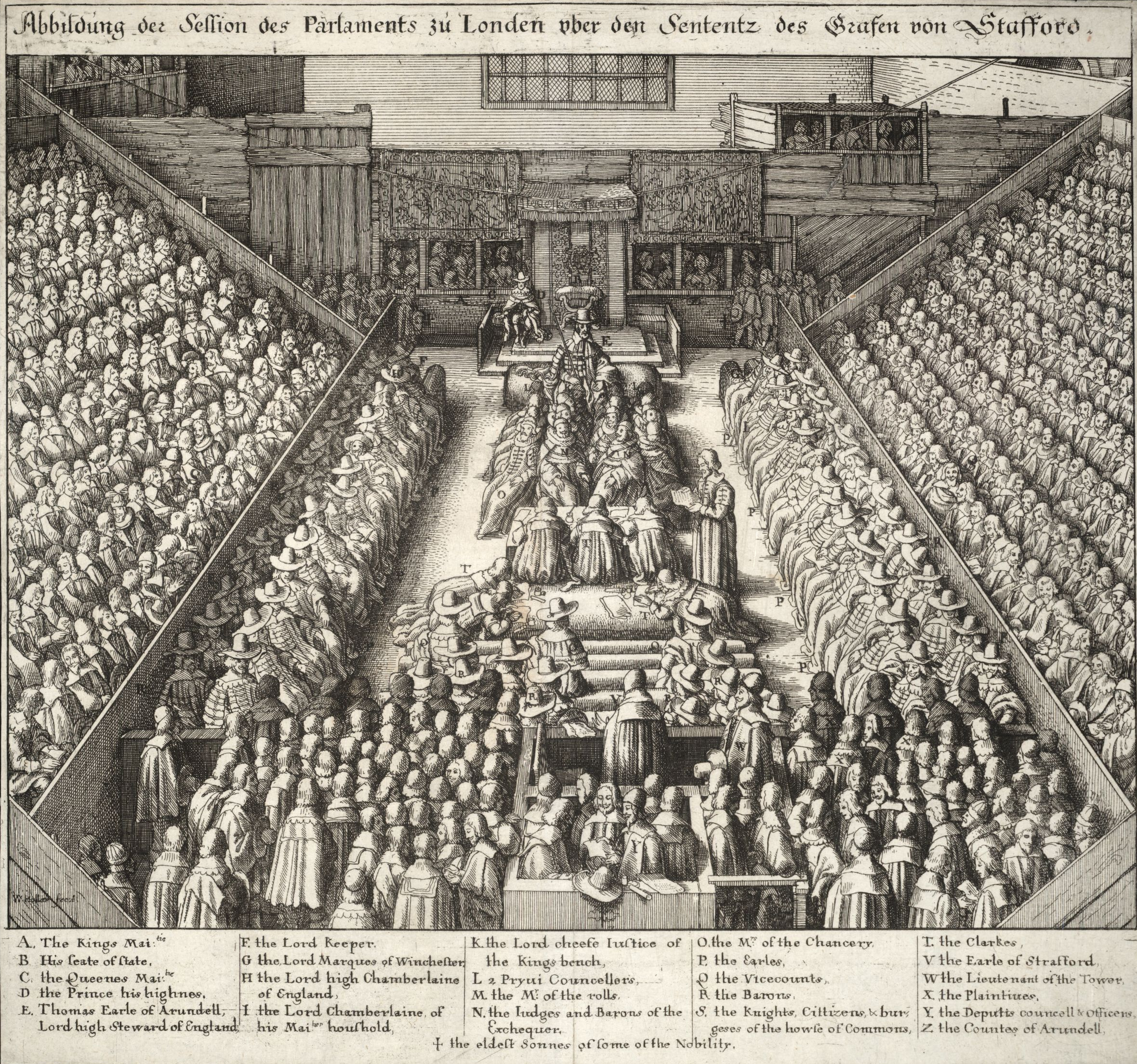
- Trial of the Earl of Strafford; Slingsby acted as his personal secretary during this period

Member of Parliament for Carysfort
- In office August 1634 – April 1635

Personal details
- Born: 1610 Bifrons, Kent
- Died: 19 January 1643 (aged 32) Guisborough
- Resting place: York Minster
- Party: Royalist
- Education: University of St Andrews
- Occupation: Politician

Military service
- Allegiance: Royalist
- Rank: Colonel
- Unit: Colonel Guilford Slingsby’s Regiment of Horse
- Battles/wars: First English Civil War; Battle of Guisborough

Guilford Slingsby (1610–1643) was a member of the Yorkshire gentry who was confidential secretary to Thomas Wentworth, 1st Earl of Strafford, and present during the trial which ended in his execution in April 1641.

Slingsby sat in the Parliament of Ireland as Member of Parliament for Carysfort from 1634 to 1635, and during Strafford's period as Lord Deputy of Ireland was appointed to several administrative posts.

When the First English Civil War began in August 1642, he raised a regiment for the Royalist army in Northern England; he was badly wounded in a skirmish near Guisborough on 16 January 1643 and died three days later.

== Personal details ==
Guilford Slingsby was born in 1610, eldest son of Sir Guylford Slingsby, (1565-1631) and Margaret Walter (died after 1650). His grandmother was Mary Percy, sister of the Percy Earl of Northumberland, traditionally one of the most powerful families in Northern England.

The Slingsbys were a large family distributed throughout North Yorkshire; his father was one of eight surviving sons, while Guilford was the eldest of twelve. His siblings included Robert (1611-1661), Walter (died after 1650), Arthur (1623-1666), Dorothy, Margaret, Mary and Anne.

== Career ==
Slingsby grew up at Bifrons in Kent, where his father, who was Comptroller of the Navy from 1611 to 1631, purchased an estate; he was educated at the University of St Andrews, before spending a few years at University of Oxford.

His uncle Sir Francis Slingsby (1559-1651) served in the Nine Years' War in Ireland and married an heiress; he was a member of the Munster Council where he held extensive lands. It may have been this connection that led to his election as Member of Parliament for Carysfort in 1634. The first Irish Parliament since 1615, it had been summoned by the Earl of Strafford, newly appointed Lord Deputy of Ireland; shortly afterwards, Slingsby became his personal secretary. It is possible he was recommended by his relative Algernon Percy, 10th Earl of Northumberland, one of Strafford's closest friends.

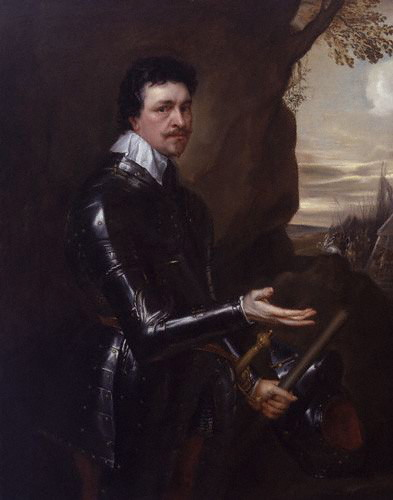
The Earl of Strafford; Slingsby acted as his personal secretary until his execution in 1641

The Oxford Dictionary of National Biography states Slingsby was appointed to the Irish Board of Ordnance and Vice-admiral of Munster; the latter position was held by Strafford, so he may have acted as his deputy. Nevertheless, it was an important position, as Munster in particular was an attractive target for pirates and thus required greater supervision than other areas.

When Strafford was impeached by the Parliament of England in 1640, Slingsby provided support throughout the trial and gave evidence on his behalf. After he was sentenced to death, Slingsby discussed ways of commuting his sentence with his relative by marriage, Denzil Holles, including arranging his escape from the Tower of London. These proved unsuccessful; prior to his execution, Strafford wrote Slingsby a final letter which ended "...God direct and prosper you in all your ways; and remember there was a person whom you were content to call master that did very much value and esteem you and carried to his death a great stock of his affections for you".

Slingsby went into exile in the Netherlands and in February 1642 joined the retinue of Queen Henrietta Maria, who was purchasing arms and raising support for the Royalist war effort. She appointed him secretary to the 12-year-old Prince of Wales, but when the First English Civil War began in August 1642, he returned to his estates in Hemlington, now part of Middlesbrough, where he began recruiting for Charles I. Of his younger brothers, Robert was one of the few naval captains not to join the Parliamentarians, and was held in the Tower until December 1643 before being released. Walter spent most of the war in the West Country, and surrendered at Oxford in June 1646.

North Yorkshire January 1643

Like many officers in the early stages of the war, Slingsby lacked military experience but brought with him mercenaries hired in Holland, which he used to train his recruits. By mid-January, he had around 100 cavalry and 400 infantry based in Guisborough, which were used to protect Royalist arms shipments arriving from Europe. On 15 January, the Earl of Newcastle, Royalist commander in the north, ordered him to occupy Whitby; hearing this, Sir Hugh Cholmeley, Parliamentarian commander in Scarborough, moved on to intercept him.

On 16 January, he arrived outside Guisborough with about 400 men; the Royalists advanced to meet the attack and held their ground for two hours before the half-trained infantry broke in panic. Casualties on both sides were minimal, Cholmeley claiming only two men slightly injured; however, Slingsby was badly wounded and taken prisoner. He died on 19 January from his wounds and was buried in York Minster on 26th. Cholmeley, who was distantly related to Slingsby, changed sides several weeks later and held Scarborough for the Royalists until forced to surrender in July 1645.

== Sources ==
- Appleby, John C; O'Dowd, Mary (1985). "The Irish Admiralty: Its Organisation and Development, c. 1570-1640". Irish Historical Studies. 24 (95): 299–326. doi:10.1017/S0021121400034234. JSTOR 60000010. S2CID 164205451.
- BCW. "Sir Hugh Cholmley's Regiment of Foot". BCW Project.
- Beetham, Reverend William (1805). The baronetage of England, Volume V. E Lloyd.
- Capp, Bernard; McConnell, Anita (2004). "Slingsby, Sir Robert, baronet". Oxford Dictionary of National Biography (online ed.). Oxford University Press. doi:10.1093/ref:odnb/25729. (Subscription, Wikipedia Library access or UK public library membership required.)
- Judge. "Lord Mohun's Regiment of Foot". BCW Project.
- Plant. "Colonel Guilford Slingsby's Regiment of Horse". BCW Project.
- Robins, Daniel; Philo, Phil. "The First Great Civil War in the Tees Valley 1642-1646" (PDF). Tees Archaeology. Archived from the original (PDF) on 13 January 2021.
- Royle, Trevor (2004). Civil War: The Wars of the Three Kingdoms 1638–1660 (2006 ed.). Abacus. ISBN 978-0-349-11564-1.
- Rushworth, John (1721). The Trial of the Earl of Strafford in Historical Collections of Private Passages of State: Volume 8, 1640-41. Browne. pp. 771–779.
- Wedgwood, C.V. (1962). Thomas Wentworth, 1st Earl of Strafford 1593-1641- a revaluation (2000 ed.). Weidenfeld & Nicolson. ISBN 978-1842120811.
