= William Holstocke =

Vice-Admiral William Holstocke
- Died: 1589
- Military career
- Allegiance: England
- Branch: Navy Royal
- Rank: Vice-Admiral
- Commands: Keeper of the Storehouses; Comptroller of the Navy; Admiral of the Narrow Seas
- Conflicts: Anglo-French War of 1557 to 1559

Vice-Admiral William Holstocke (died 1589) was an English naval commander who became the first Comptroller of the Navy in its original role.

== Naval career ==
Holstocke first went to sea in 1534 as page to Richard Gonson's voyages to Crete and Chios, and returned there the next year where he served as purser. By 1546 he was part of the Navy's establishment and a member of the Council of the Marine following his appointment as Keeper of the Storehouses in 1548, a post he held until 1560. He served in the Anglo-French War of 1557 to 1559 and in 1563 helped evacuate the English garrison at Le Havre. He was responsible for building or re-building many of Queen Elizabeth's ships. At the time of the Spanish Armada he was engaged in preparing the Queen's ships although he saw no active duty. He was appointed Comptroller of the Navy in 1561. He was next appointed Admiral of the Narrow Seas from August 1562 to October 1563. He died in 1589 and was buried at St Mary-at-Hill.

Military offices
Preceded by New Post	Comptroller of the Navy; 1561–1580	Succeeded by William Borough
