= John Mennes =

English naval officer

Vice-Admiral Sir John Mennes
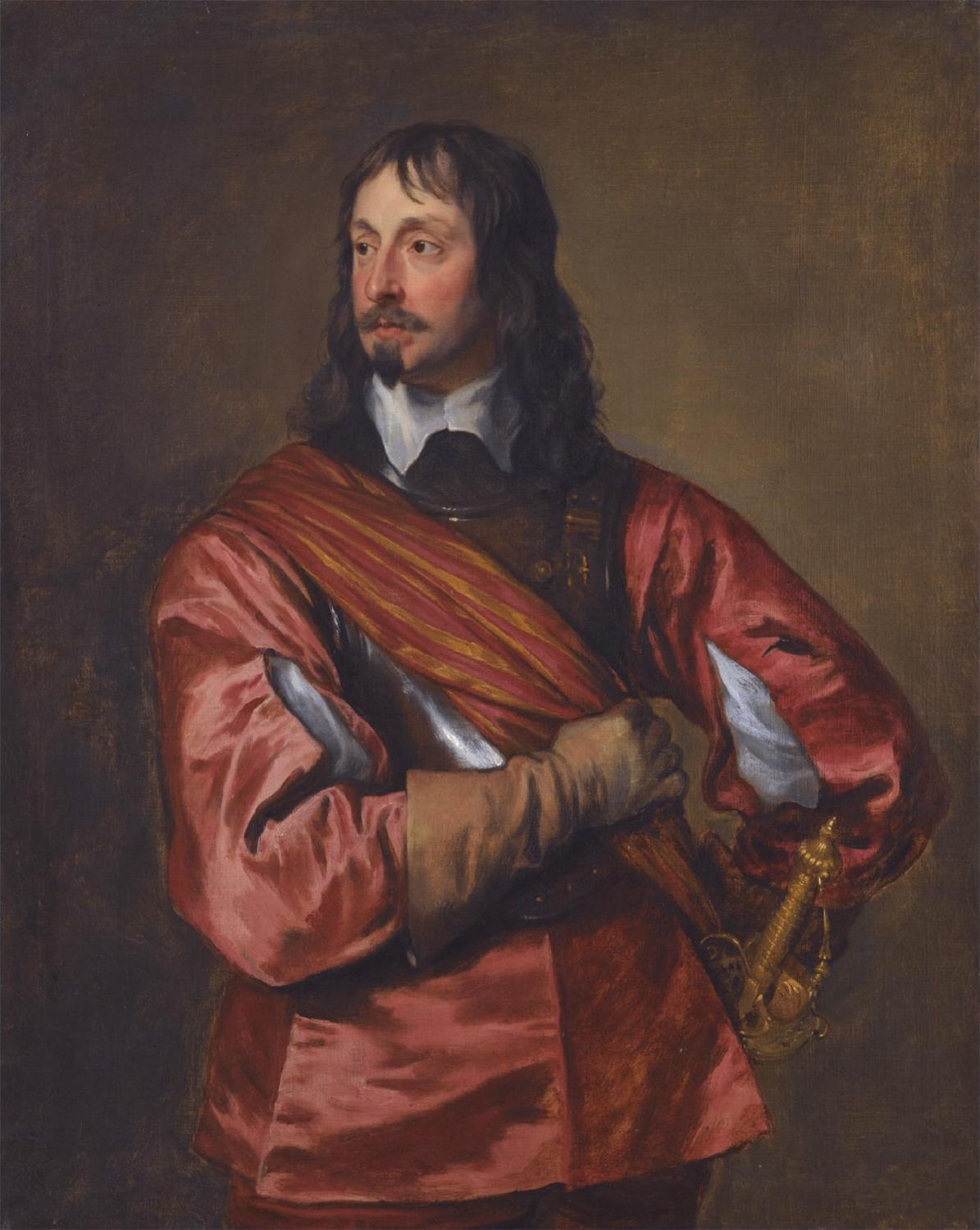
- Portrait of Mennes by Anthony van Dyck.
- Born: 1 March 1599; Sandwich, Kent, England
- Died: 18 February 1671 (aged 71); London, England
- Military career
- Allegiance: England
- Branch: Royal Navy
- Rank: Vice-Admiral
- Commands: Adventure; Garland; Red Lion; Vanguard; Convertine; Nonsuch; Victory; Henry; Downs Station; Commander in Chief, Narrow Seas; Comptroller of the Navy

Vice-Admiral Sir John Mennes (with variant spellings, 1 March 1599 – 18 February 1671) was an English naval officer, who went on to be Comptroller of the Navy. He was also considered a wit. His comic and satirical verses, written in correspondence with James Smith, were published in 1656. He figures prominently in the Diary of Samuel Pepys, who reported directly to Mennes at the Navy Office and thought him an incompetent civil servant, but a delightful social companion.

== Career ==
Mennes was the third son of Andrew Mennes of Sandwich, Kent, and Jane Blechnden.

Educated at his local grammar school in Sandwich, and Corpus Christi College, Oxford, Mennes went to sea and in 1620 saw action off Dominica, fighting Spanish warships. In 1628 he was given command of Adventure and later of Garland, Red Lion, Vanguard, Convertine, Nonsuch and Victory. In August 1641 he took Queen Henrietta Maria to safety in Hellevoetsluis in the Netherlands and was knighted by King Charles I for doing so. In July 1642 he refused to accept the parliamentary takeover of the fleet.

In 1643, once the King had lost the Navy, Mennes transferred to the Army and became a general of artillery and in 1644 he became Governor of North Wales. In 1645 he was appointed Commander-in-Chief at the Downs until 1649. In 1650 he left England to join the exiled Court abroad.

=== Mennes and Pepys ===
In November 1661, after the Restoration of the monarchy, Mennes was appointed Vice Admiral and Commander in Chief in the Narrow Seas, Captain of Henry and commander of the fleet taking the Earl of Peterborough to occupy English Tangier. This appears to have been his last active commission. Before the voyage he had been appointed Comptroller of the Navy. Samuel Pepys as Clerk of the Acts reported directly to Mennes, whom he described as "ill at ease" in this role, which in fairness to Mennes was described as "impossibly burdensome". When Pepys was exasperated by Mennes's incompetence, as he all too frequently was, he would refer to him in his Diary as a "coxcomb", "dolt", "dotard" and "old fool". Outside office hours, however, Pepys admitted that Mennes's skills as a poet and mimic made him the best of company. He describes a memorable evening when Mennes and John Evelyn engaged in a mimicry contest; Mennes with generosity admitted that Evelyn was the winner. Pepys's kindest judgement on him (when he was wrongly thought to be dying in 1666) was that he was a "good, honest, harmless gentleman, but not fit for office". Dissatisfaction with Mennes became general and sporadic efforts were made by his colleagues to have him removed, but without success. It is generally thought that he owed his survival to the increasingly bitter attacks on the Navy Board in the House of Commons: the King was reluctant to sacrifice Mennes, as this might have facilitated an all-out attack on the administration of one of the most important Departments of State. Even Pepys was prepared in 1670 to defend Mennes in public before the House of Commons as a man of great integrity, who had worn out his health in the service of the Crown.

He died in London in 1671, aged 71, while still in the post of Controller. The bulk of his estate passed to his nephew Francis Hammond.

== Poetry ==
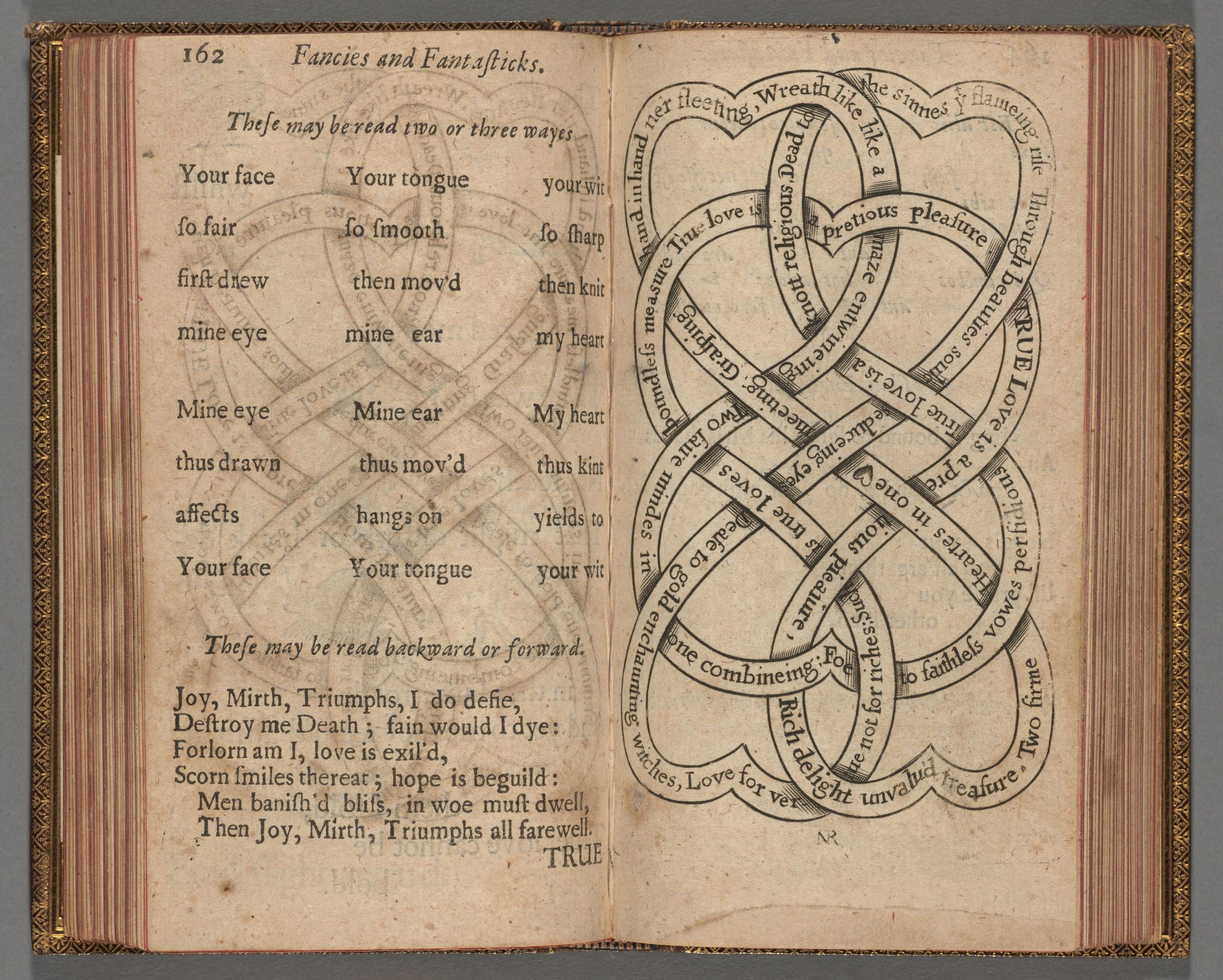
A 1683 edition of poems by Mennes

Mennes's verses appeared in 1656 in a collection entitled Musarum Deliciæ or the Muses's Recreation. They appear to have been written for amusement in correspondence with James Smith, whose replies were included, both being light and satirical in tone. The publisher, Henry Herringman, stated that he collected the poems from "Sir John Mennis "[sic]" and Dr. Smith's drollish intercourses". Another anthology, Wit Restored, appeared in 1658, with verse letters from Smith to Mennes, "then commanding a troop of horse against the Scots". Another piece was written to Mennes "on the Surrender of Conway Castle".

A satirical poem on John Suckling's feeble military efforts at the Battle of Newburn is attributed to Mennes. Mennes was himself satirised by John Denham, whose poem about Mennes going from Calais to Boulogne to "eat a pig" is mentioned by Samuel Pepys in his diary.

== Shakespeare anecdote ==
According to Thomas Plume, Mennes told him he had once met William Shakespeare's father John Shakespeare – a "merry cheeked old man" who said of his son that "Will was a good honest fellow, but he durst have cracked a jest with him at any time". Katherine Duncan-Jones points out that this is impossible, as Mennes was two years old when John Shakespeare died. She thinks Plume may have been recording an anecdote related by Mennis about his father.

== Family ==
In 1641 Mennes married Jane Liddel (died 1662), perhaps as his second wife. They had no children. In his later years, according to Pepys, Mennes's widowed sister Mary Hammon or Hammond (died 1668), mother of Francis Hammond, kept house for him. In addition to his nephew Francis, he had at least two nieces to whom he left legacies; his niece Elizabeth Hammond was his executrix.
