= Guylford Slingsby =

Sir Guylford Slingsby
- Born: 1565
- Died: 1631 (aged 65–66)
- Military career
- Allegiance: England
- Branch: Royal Navy
- Rank: Comptroller of the Navy

Sir Guylford Slingsby (1565–1631) was an administrator who went on to be Comptroller of the Navy; he produced a number of distinguished sons.

== Early life ==
He was born at Scriven in North Yorkshire, eighth son of Sir Francis Slingsby of Scriven and Mary Percy, daughter of Sir Thomas Percy and Eleanor Harbottle and sister of Thomas Percy, 7th Earl of Northumberland and Henry Percy, 8th Earl of Northumberland. Most of his brothers died young: those who survived included Sir Henry Slingsby and Sir William Slingsby.

== Career ==
Slingsby was appointed Comptroller of the Navy following the death of Sir Henry Palmer in 1611. The position of Comptroller was placed in the hands of a commission from 1618 to 1628 when Slingsby resumed control. He held the post until his death in 1631.

He lived at Bifrons in Canterbury.

== Family ==
He married Margaret Walter of York; they had eight sons most of whom reached adult life. Margaret was still living in York in 1650 with her son Robert, who in that year "compounded" to keep part of the family estates in return for paying the usual fine levied on defeated Royalists.

Several of Guylford's sons achieved fame, including:

- Guildford Slingsby, who was a member of the Irish House of Commons and also trusted secretary to Thomas Wentworth, 1st Earl of Strafford
- Sir Robert Slingsby, 1st Baronet, who like his father was Comptroller of the Navy, and was a close friend of Samuel Pepys
- Sir Arthur Slingsby, first of the Slingsby baronets of Bifrons; he was the only brother to leave issue
- Walter who fought with distinction in the English Civil War

Guylford and Margaret also had four daughters, of whom at least two reached adult life:

- Dorothy, who married Geoffrey Nightingale: she was still alive in 1650, when she assisted her brother Robert in compounding for his estate;
- Anne, who married John Caesar, grandson of Sir Julius Caesar, Master of the Rolls and had five children; she was still living, in great poverty, in 1684, when she petitioned William Sancroft, Archbishop of Canterbury, for a pension.

Military offices
Preceded by Sir Henry Palmer	Comptroller of the Navy; 1611–1631	Succeeded by Sir Henry Palmer
