= Comptroller of the Navy (Navy Board) =

Position in the Royal Navy

Office of the Comptroller of the Navy
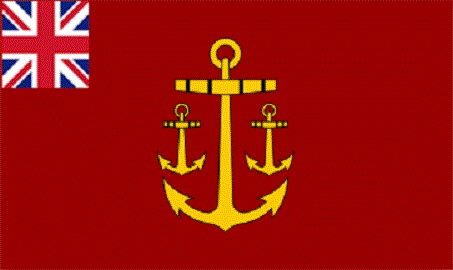
- Navy Board Flag
- Department of the Admiralty
- Member of: Navy Board (1546–1832)
- Reports to: First Lord of the Admiralty
- Nominator: First Lord of the Admiralty
- Appointer: Prime Minister; Subject to formal approval by the King-in-Council
- Term length: Not fixed (usually for life)
- Inaugural holder: John Hopton
- Formation: 1512–1832

The Comptroller of the Navy originally called the Clerk Comptroller of the Navy was originally a principal member of the English Navy Royal, and later the British Royal Navy, Navy Board. From 1512 until 1832, the Comptroller was mainly responsible for all British naval spending and directing the business of the Navy Board from 1660 as its chairman. The position was abolished in 1832 when the Navy Board was merged into the Board of Admiralty. The comptroller was based at the Navy Office.

== History ==
The post was originally created in 1512 during the reign of Henry VIII of England when the post holder was styled as the Clerk Comptroller until 1545. In 1561 the name was changed to Comptroller of the Navy. The Comptroller presided over the Board from 1660, and generally superintended the business of the Navy Office, and was responsible for the offices dealing with bills, accounts and wages during the sixteenth and seventeenth centuries. By the eighteenth century the principal officer responsible for estimating annual stores requirements, inspecting ships' stores and maintaining the Fleet's store-books and repair-bills was the Surveyor of the Navy; however, the Surveyor's duties passed increasingly to the Comptroller of the Navy during the latter half this period. The office of Surveyor did not altogether disappear. In 1832 the Comptroller's department was abolished following a merger of the Navy Board with the Board of Admiralty and the Surveyor was made the officer responsible under the First Naval Lord for the material departments, and became an adviser to the Board of Admiralty. In 1860, the name of the office was changed to Controller of the Navy, and in 1869 was merged with the office of the Third Naval Lord, then becoming known as Third Naval Lord and Controller of the Navy. The Third Naval Lord and Controller of the Navy was independent of the First Naval Lord and was themself a member of the Board of Admiralty.

== Office holders ==
Included:

=== Clerk Comptrollers of the Navy ===
- John Hopton, 1512-1524
- Vice-Admiral, Sir Thomas Spert, 1524-1540
- John Osborne, 1540-1545
- William Broke, 1545-1561

=== Comptrollers of the Navy ===
- Vice-Admiral William Holstocke, 1561–1580
- William Borough, 1580–1598
- Sir Henry Palmer 1598– 20 November 1611
- Sir Guylford Slingsby, 1611–1618

Post in commission 1618–1628

- Sir Guylford Slingsby 1628–1631
- Sir Henry Palmer, 1632–1641
- Vice-Admiral Sir George Carteret, 1641–1642
- Sir Robert Slingsby, 31 August 1660 - 26 October 1661
- Vice-Admiral Sir John Mennes, 28 November 1661 – 18 February 1671
- Admiral Sir Thomas Allin, 15 April 1671 – 28 January 1680
- Thomas Hayter, 28 January 1680 - 2 February 1682
- Vice-Admiral Sir Richard Haddock, 2 February 1682 – 17 April 1686

Post vacant 1686-1688

- Admiral Sir Richard Haddock, 12 October 1688 – 26 January 1715
- Rear-Admiral Sir Charles Wager, 16 March 1715 – 23 April 1718
- Thomas Swanton, 23 April 1718 - 9 February 1723
- Vice Admiral James Mighells, 9 February 1723 – 21 March 1734
- Captain Richard Haddock, 27 April 1734 – 27 March 1749
- Captain Savage Mostyn, 27 March 1749 – 28 February 1755
- Commodore Edward Falkingham, 28 February 1755 - 25 November 1755
- Captain Charles Saunders, 25 November 1755 – 24 June 1756
- Captain Digby Dent, 24 June 1756 - 29 December 1756
- Captain George Cockburne, 29 December 1756 – 20 July 1770
- Captain Sir Hugh Palliser, 6 August 1770 – 12 April 1775
- Captain Maurice Suckling, 12 April 1775 – 14 July 1778
- Admiral Charles Middleton, 7 August 1778 – 29 March 1790
- Captain Sir Henry Martin, 29 March 1790 – 1 August 1794
- Captain Sir Andrew Hamond, 25 September 1794 – 3 March 1806
- Captain Henry Nicholls, 3 March 1806 – 20 June 1806
- Vice-Admiral Sir Thomas Thompson, 20 June 1806 – 24 February 1816
- Admiral Sir Thomas Byam Martin, 24 February 1816 – 2 November 1831
- Rear-Admiral Hon. George Dundas, 2 November 1831 - June 1832

In 1832 the post of Comptroller of the Navy was abolished and duties passed to the Surveyor of the Navy.

== See also ==
- Admiralty in the 16th century
- History of the Royal Navy

== Sources ==
- Childs. David (2009). Tudor Sea Power: The Foundation of Greatness. Seaforth Publishing. ISBN 9781473819924.
- Collinge, J.M. (1978). Navy Board officials, 1660-1832 Volume 7 of Office-holders in modern Britain. London: University of London, Institute of Historical Research.
