= Harry Palmer (animator) =

Harry S. Palmer was an animator in the United States. About 20 of his films are preserved in the Library of Congress. He worked at Gaumont's American division in Flushing, New York.

In 1911, a notice was printed advertising his becoming a contributor to the Vancouver World. On December 14, 1912, the Vancouver Sun published his cartoon mocking the U.S. for not heeding calls for Panama Canal arbitration.

One news brief stated he was working on animations titled Kriterion Komic Kartoon.

Showings of Mutual's See America First series were sometimes accompanied by Palmer's cartoon films including They Say Pigs Is Pigs (1917) and Rastus Runs Amuck, shown with a See America First film about sights in Oregon and along the Mississippi River. His short Rastus Runs Amuck was described in Motion Picture World as "a quaint little oddity of pickaninny life animated for the screen."

== Selected filmography ==
- Keeping Up with the Joneses (animated series), a series that was discontinued after the loss of a patent infringement lawsuit from John Randolph Bray
  - Women's Styles
  - Men's Styles
- Kartoon Komics
  - I’m Insured (1916)
  - Professor Bonehead Is Shipwrecked (1916)
- Ham and Eggs
- Dad's College Widow
- Rastus Runs Amuck (1917)
- They Say Pigs Is Pigs (1917), adapted from the Ellis Parker Butler short story "Pigs is Pigs"
- Tale of a Whale
- The Family Adopt a Camel
- Pa Feigns Sickness
