= Santa Maria di Monteverginella =

Church building in Naples, Italy

Church of Santa Maria di Monteverginella
- Chiesa di Santa Maria di Monteverginella
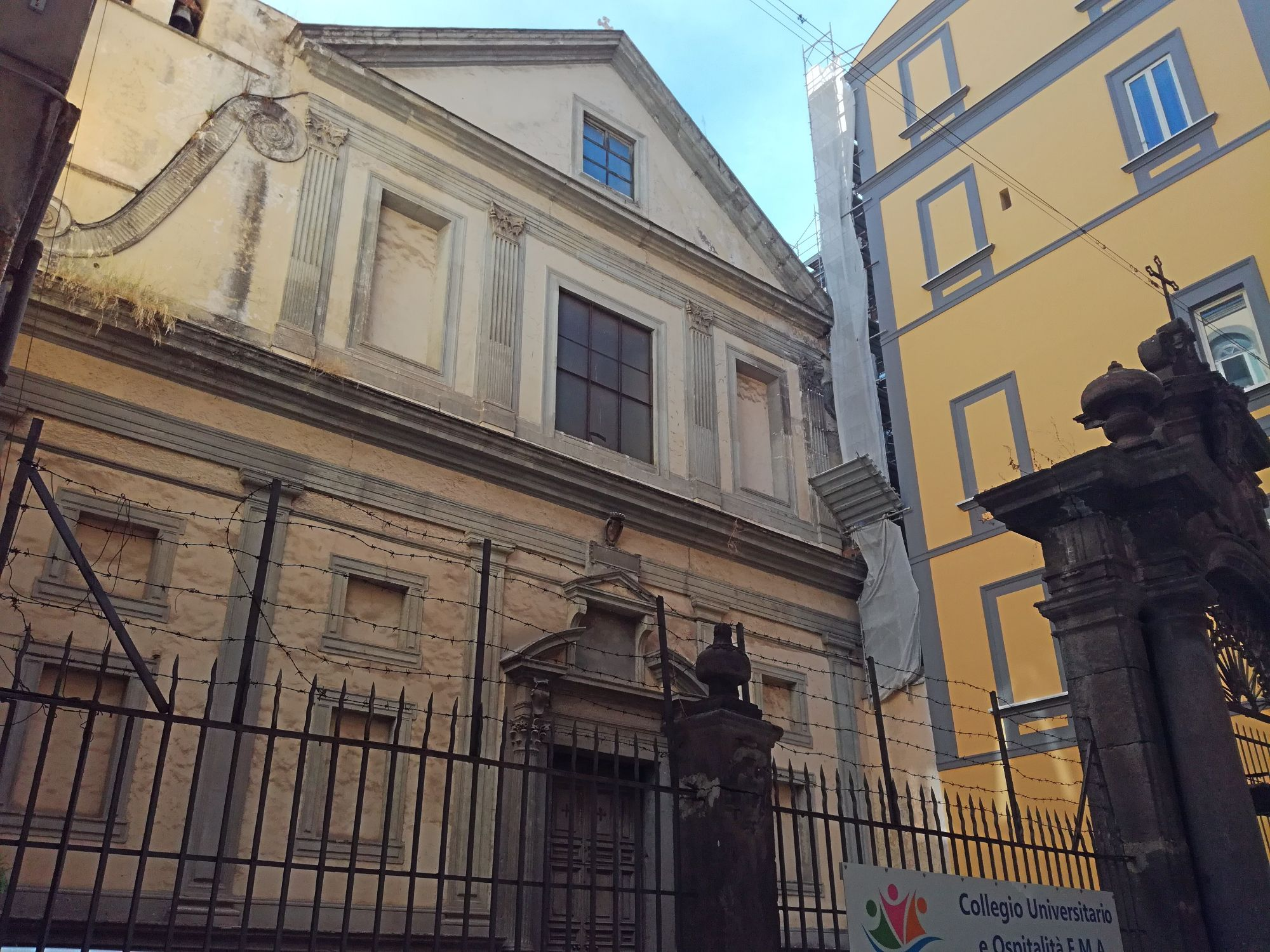
- The facade of Santa Maria di Monteverginella in Naples.
- Church of Santa Maria di Monteverginella
- 40.847598°N 14.257070°E
- Location: Naples; Province of Naples, Campania
- Country: Italy
- Denomination: Roman Catholic

History
- Status: Active

Architecture
- Architectural type: Church
- Style: Baroque architecture
- Groundbreaking: 1134

Administration
- Diocese: Roman Catholic Archdiocese of Naples

Santa Maria di Monteverginella is a Roman Catholic church in Naples, Italy. To the right of the facade, is the separate Chapel of Santa Maria della Concezione (Chapel of Holy Mary of the Conception).

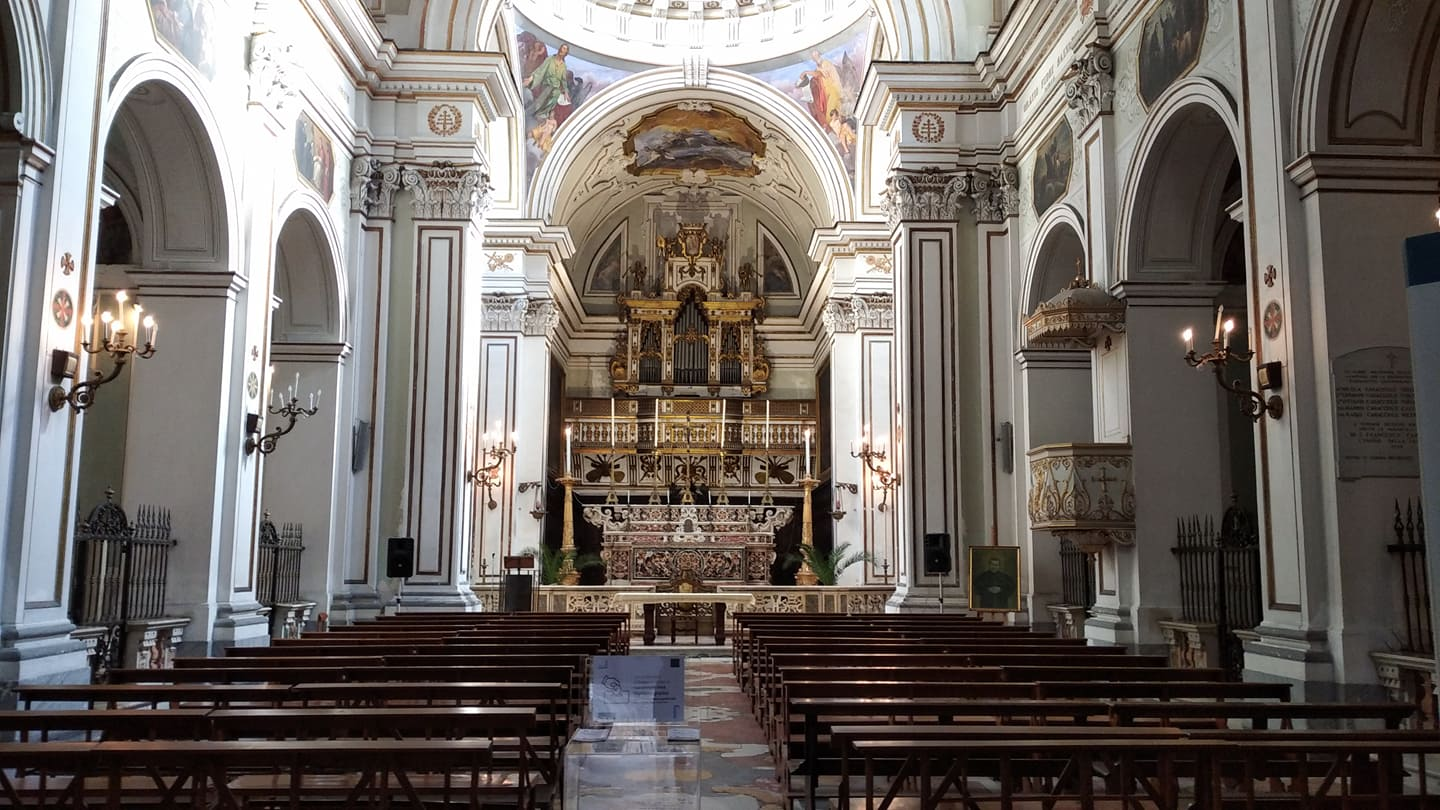
Interior

== History ==
The building and adjacent monastery was founded in 1314 by the resident of the neighborhood, Bartolomeo di Capua, who was also protonotary of the King Robert of Anjou. The aedicule or ancient shrine of Santa Maria di Alto Spirito was incorporated into the church. In 1588, the complex underwent a partial remodeling by the architect and engineer Vito Alfieri and in the 17th century by Francesco Antonio Picchiatti. The interior decoration in stucco and marble (1726) is due to Domenico Antonio Vaccaro. In 1843, the church was restored by Gaetano Genovese, who eliminated most of the 18th century decorations.

The interior is a Latin cross plan, in the ceiling are three canvases of the Glory of St Benedict , St Benedict and Benedictine Saints, (1728) by Vaccaro. The main altar was constructed of polychrome marble and pietra dure (1656) by Dionisio Lazzari. The church frescoes were by Belisario Corenzio.

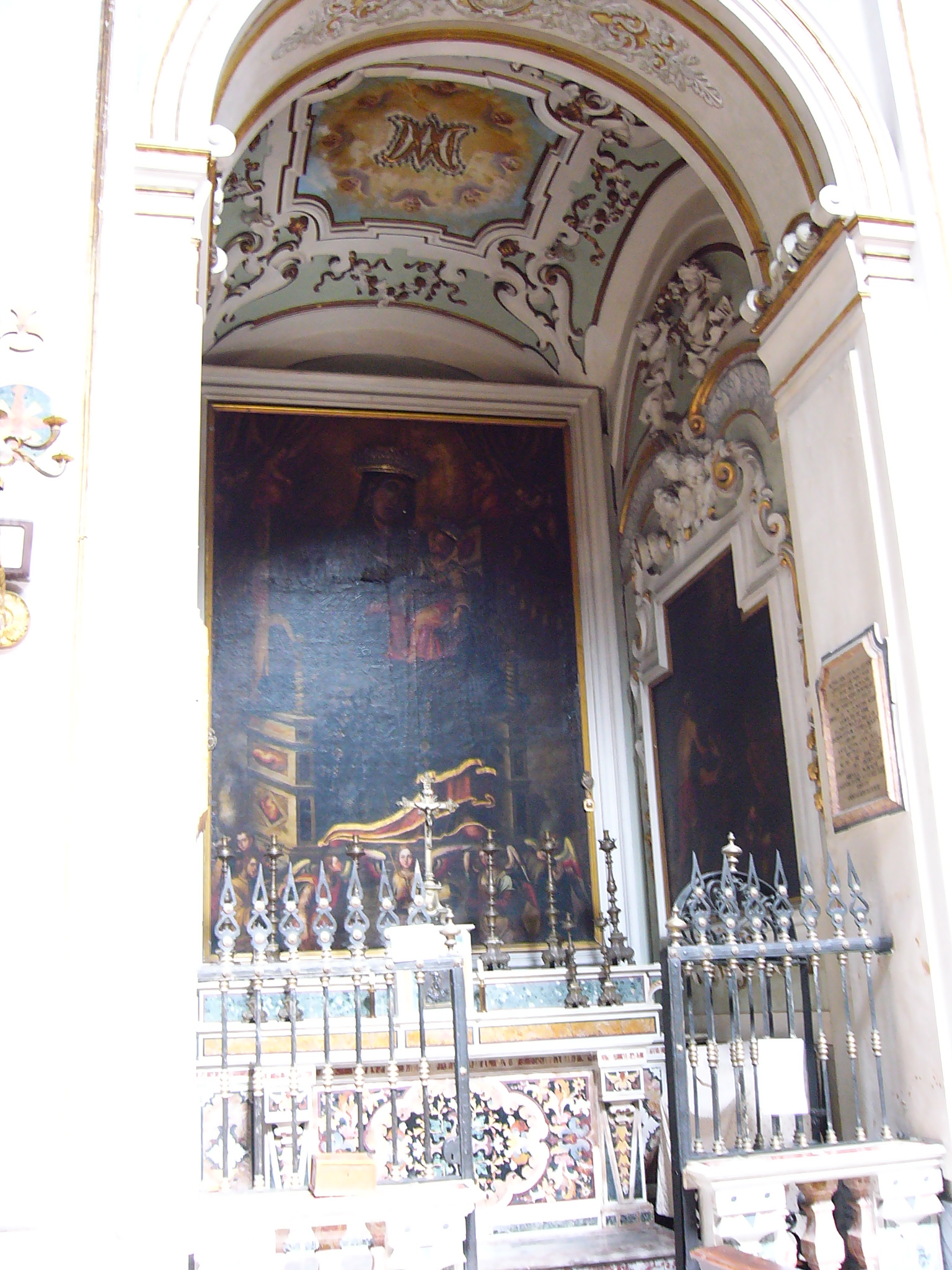
Chapel

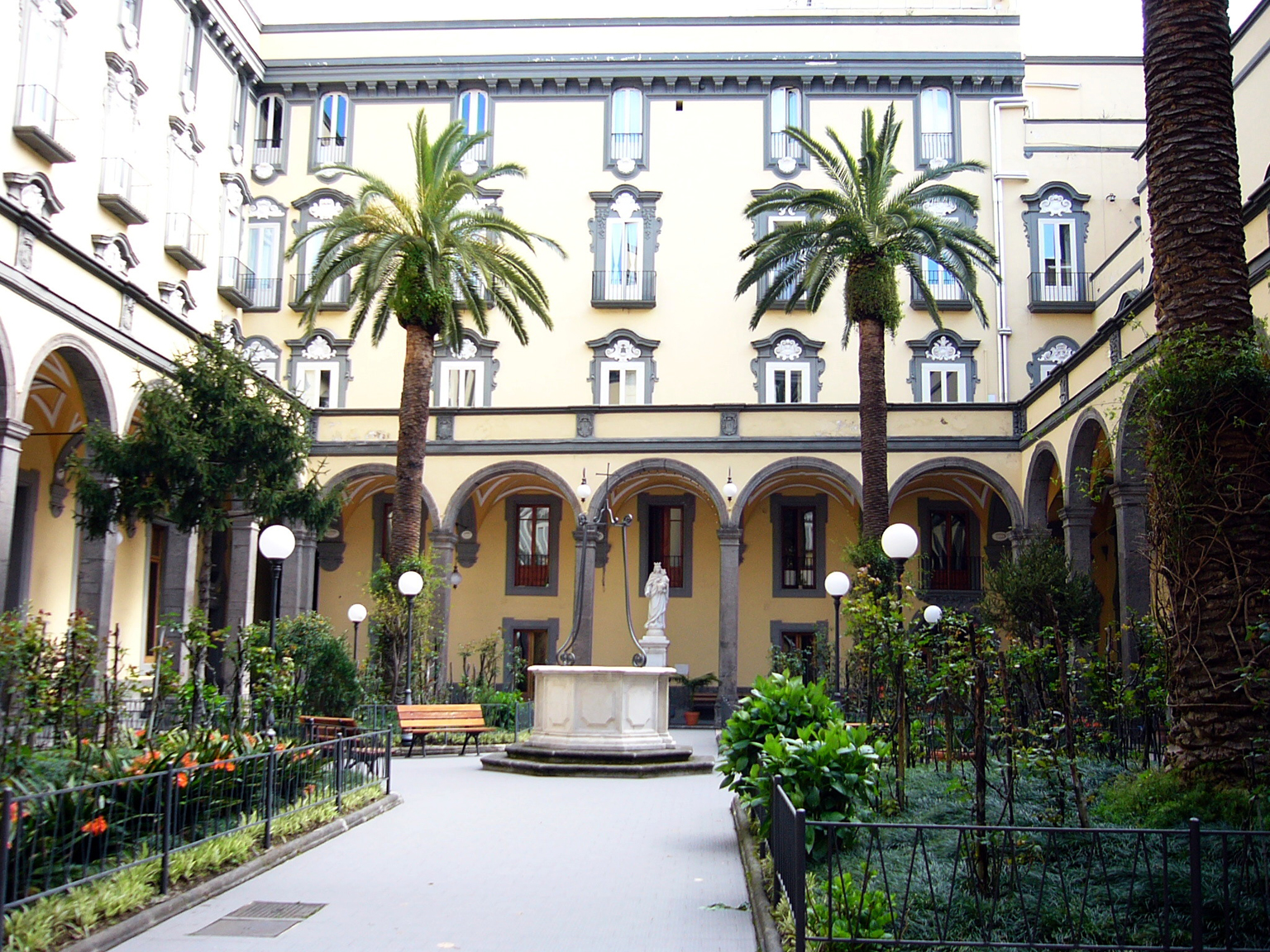
Cloister

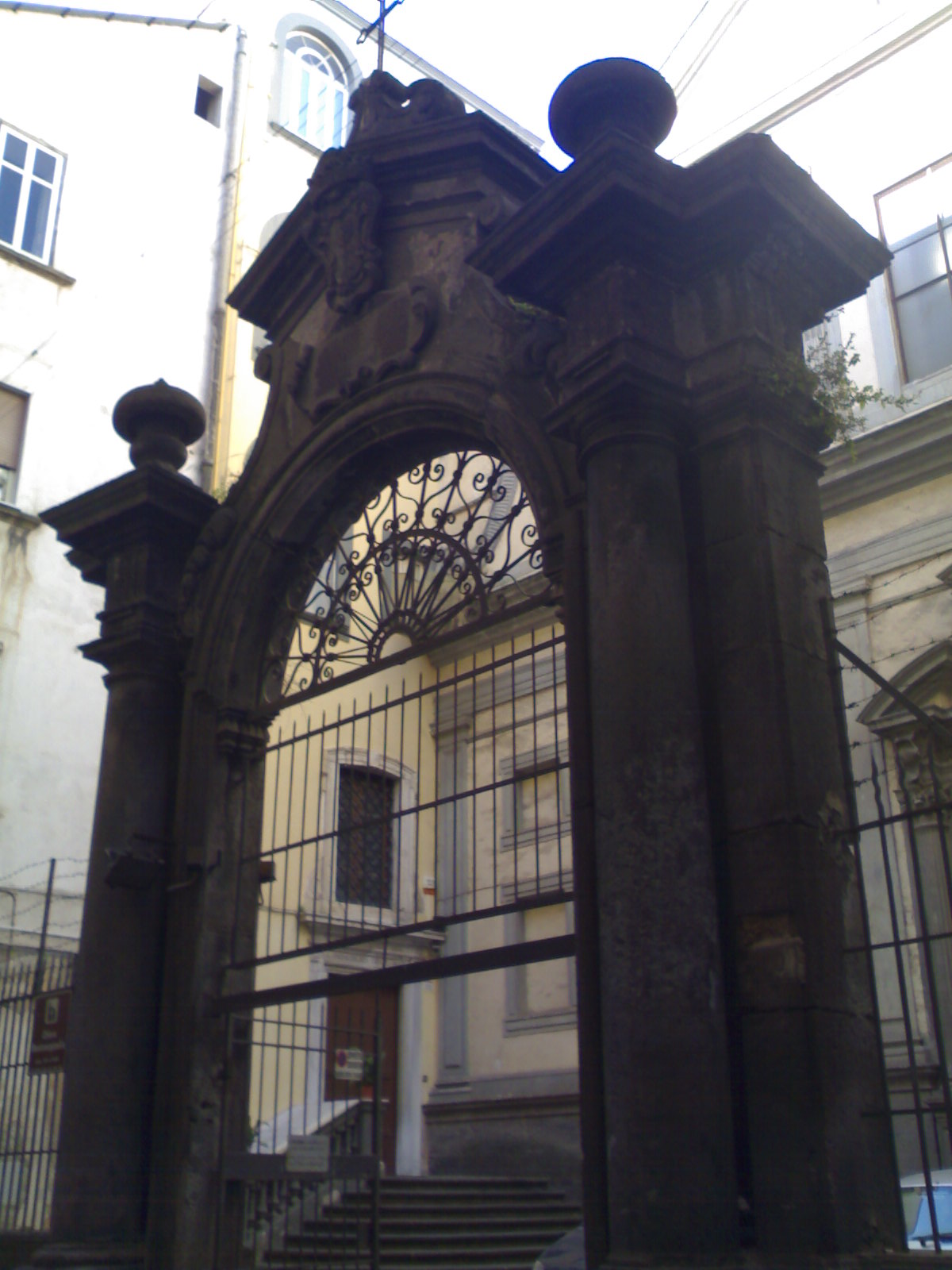
Portal

== Bibliography ==
- Vincenzo Regina, Le chiese di Napoli. Viaggio indimenticabile attraverso la storia artistica, architettonica, letteraria, civile e spiriturale della Napoli sacra, Newton and Compton editor, Naples 2004.
