= James Smith (archdeacon of Barnstaple) =

17th-century English Anglican priest and poet

- Archdeacon of Barnstaple
- Church: Church of England
- Diocese: Exeter
- In office: 1660–1662
- Other posts: Precentor of Exeter Cathedral; Rector of Alphington, Devon

Personal details
- Born: Marston Moretaine, England
- Died: 1667
- Spouse: Elizabeth Smith
- Profession: Clergyman

James Smith (baptized 1605, died 1667) was a clergyman who became Archdeacon of Barnstaple in 1660. He was also much admired for his wit, and collections of his satirical verse were published in the 1650s.

Smith was the son of Thomas, the rector of Marston Moretaine, Bedfordshire, who owned land in three counties. He matriculated at Oxford in 1622–23. He was awarded the degree of DD in 1661.

== Career ==
Smith was navy chaplain to Admiral Henry, earl of Holland and domestic chaplain to Thomas, earl of Cleveland. He was also rector of Wainfleet All Saints, Lincolnshire in 1634 and of Kings Nympton, Devon from 1639 to 1662. He was collated archdeacon of Barnstaple in 1660 (until 1662), resigning to become precentor of Exeter cathedral and a canon of Exeter in 1662. He had been granted the title Doctor of Divinity in 1661. He was rector of Alphington, Devon in 1662 and of Exminster, Devon in 1664.

Smith died on 22 June 1667 and was buried in the chancel of Kings Nympton church.

== Poetry ==
Smith was much admired by the "poetical wits" of the day. Philip Massinger is said to have referred to him as his son. He was also friendly with William Davenant. He wrote satirical poetry, which was published in a collection entitled Musarum Deliciæ or the Muses' Recreation, in 1656. Smith's verses appear to have been written for amusement in correspondence with Sir John Mennes, whose replies were also included. Both were light and satirical in tone. The publisher, Henry Herringman, stated that the poems had been collected by him from "Sir John Mennis and Dr. Smith's drolish intercourses." Another anthology called Wit Restored was published in 1658. This contains verse letters from Smith to Mennis, "then commanding a troop of horse against the Scots." Another piece was written to Mennis "on the Surrender of Conway Castle."

Smith also wrote sacred anthems which were sung at Exeter in his day.
