= Övraby =

Former village in Halland County, Sweden

Coordinates: 56°41′47.04″N 12°52′23.52″E

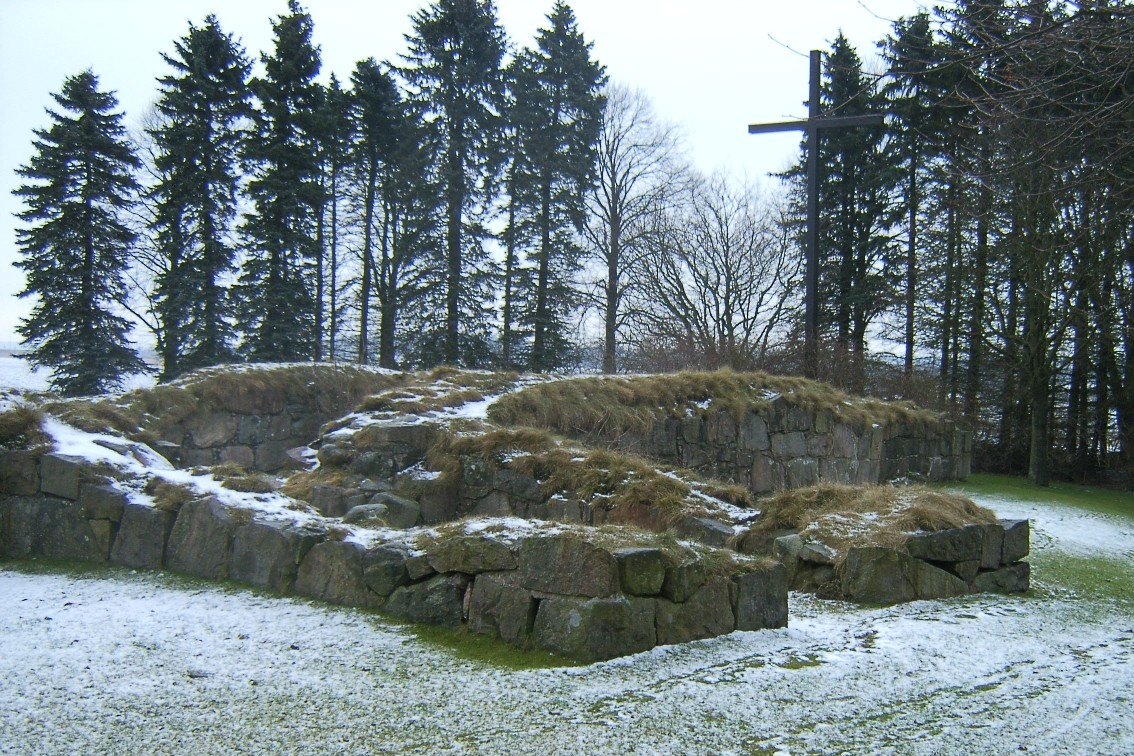
Övraby kyrkoruin

Övraby was a village that was left after the town Halmstad in Halland moved five kilometers to the south in 1320.

The town Halmstad is believed to have been moved because the ships were growing too big to be able to travel up the river Nissan, one of the four rivers that flows through the county of Halland. The city would also be easier to defend with its new coastal position.

On 2–3 November 1563, the Swedish forces led by King Erik XIV and Danish forces led by Fredrik II clashed in Övraby. The Danish forces won the battle, and afterwards torched and plundered the village. The village was never rebuilt.

The only building still standing from Övraby today is the ruin of the stone church, known today as Övraby Kyrkoruin. The church's roof is the oldest surviving example of an ornate ridge purlin in Sweden, dating back to the 12th century. In 1911 a Roman burial site was excavated from Övraby, deposited in a cist made of thin limestone slabs.
