= John Penington =

English admiral (1584?–1646)

Admiral Sir John Penington
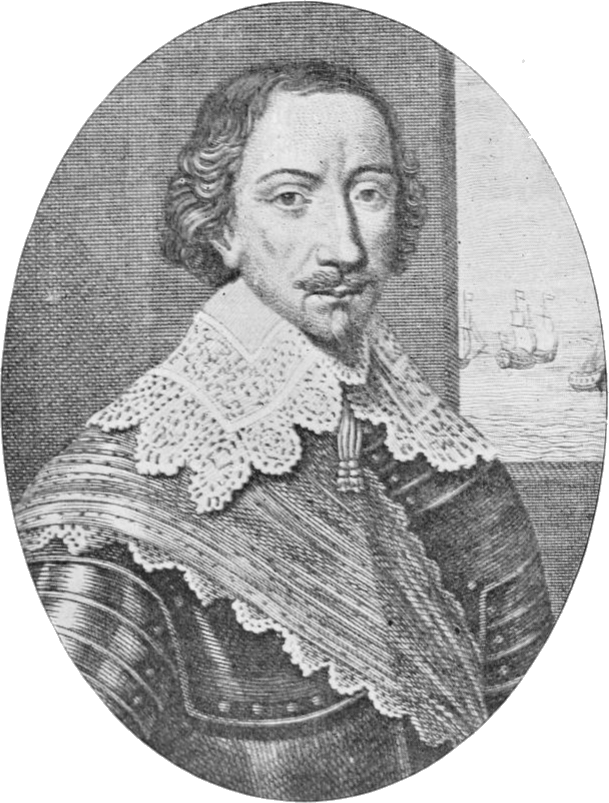
- Born: 1584
- Died: 1646 (aged 61–62)
- Military career
- Allegiance: England
- Branch: Navy Royal
- Commands: Admiral of the Narrow Seas; Commander-in-Chief, the Downs; Victory

Sir John Penington (1584?–1646) was an English admiral who served under Charles I of England.

== Biography ==
John Penington was the second cousin of Sir Isaac Penington or Pennington, and the son of Robert Penington of Henham in Essex, described as a tanner. He is said to have been baptised at Henham on 30 January 1568; but the circumstances of his later career, and the fact that he is unmentioned during the war with Spain or for twelve years after its close, suggest that he was born at a later date. It is possible that he and his half-brother, also John, born in 1584, have been confused together. The Oxford Dictionary of National Biography speculates that on balance his date of birth was 1584.

=== Captaincy ===
His name first appears as captain of his own ship, the Star, and vice-admiral under Sir Walter Raleigh in the voyage to the Orinoco in 1617. He remained with Raleigh at the mouth of the river; but putting into Kinsale, on the way home, the ship was seized by order of the Lord Deputy of Ireland, and in London he himself was thrown into prison. In a petition to the council he stated that he had lost £2,000, his whole property, in the voyage; now his ship was taken from him; not having been at St. Thomas's, he could give no information as to what had been done. He gave evidence, however, that Raleigh had 'proposed the taking of the Mexico fleet if the mine failed'.

Raleigh, writing from Saint Kitts on 21 March 1617–18, described him as 'one of the sufficientest gentlemen for the sea that England hath'. His imprisonment does not seem to have been long, and during the latter months of 1618 and through 1619 he was applying to the East India Company for employment, with a recommendation from the Duke of Buckingham. His applications were unsuccessful, and in 1620 he was in the service of the crown as captain of the Zouch Phœnix, in the expedition against Algiers under Sir Robert Mansell.

=== Command of the Victory ===
In December 1621 he was appointed to command the Victory, in which, in the following May, he carried Count Gondomar to Spain. In 1625 he was in command of the Vanguard, which, with seven hired merchant ships, the king and Buckingham had agreed to place at the disposal of the King of France for eighteen months, 'against whomsoever except the King of Great Britain.' Buckingham had probably persuaded himself that this meant against the Genoese or Spaniards, and was sorely mortified when he found that the king of France meant to use them against the rebellious Huguenots of Rochelle. The ships were ready on 11 April; but when the owners and captains understood that they were to be called on to serve against the French Protestants, they showed very clearly that they would not do so, and Sir Ferdinando Gorges, the vice-admiral of the fleet, absented himself till compelled to appear by threats of imprisonment. On 8 May Penington, as admiral of the fleet, was ordered to cross the Channel and deliver the ships; but with his orders he received an explanatory letter, directing him not to meddle with the civil war in France, or to take part in any attack on the Protestants.

But at Dieppe he was plainly told by the French that he was to be employed against Rochelle: the two orders were directly contrary, and he was probably glad to escape from the embarrassment by positively refusing to take on board the ships a large number of French soldiers, which would have been equivalent to giving up the command of the squadron. While the French were arguing the point with him, or writing to England to get Penington's orders altered, Penington discovered that he could not keep the ships lying there in an open roadstead, and returned to Portsmouth.

After a delay of more than two months, during which he received many perplexing and contradictory instructions, affairs took a more peaceful appearance as far as the Huguenots were concerned, and on 28 July he received a formal order to deliver up the Vanguard and the other ships to the French, and at the same time a private note of the king's certain knowledge that peace was made with the Huguenots, and that war would be declared against Spain. On 3 August he arrived at Dieppe; on the 5th he handed over the Vanguard to the French, and the other ships — except that of Gorges — a day or two later; but the men refused to serve, and were sent home. On the impeachment of Buckingham, in the following year, it was stated that Penington, by firing on these other ships, had compelled them to surrender; but of this there is no contemporary evidence, and the fact is improbable.

=== Admiral ===
His was appointed Rear-Admiral of the Narrow Seas from 1623 to 1626. On 3 December 1626 Penington, was next appointed Commander-in-Chief, the Downs, and was ordered to seize French ships. The determination of Richelieu to make France a maritime power was held to be an insult to the supremacy of England; and on the 24th Penington was directed to go to Le Havre, where eight ships which the French king had lately bought from the Dutch were lying. These he was, if possible, to provoke into firing at him, but in any case to pick a quarrel with them, and so to take, sink, or burn them. Penington put to sea prepared to obey, but, after looking into Havre and finding no ships there, he returned to Falmouth, and wrote to Buckingham complaining that he had been sent out at the bad time of the year, with only three weeks' provisions on board, his ships in bad order, badly supplied and badly manned, "so that if we come to any service, it is almost impossible we can come off with honour or safety".

In the following spring he put to sea under more favourable circumstances, and captured and sent in some twenty French ships at one time, and swept the sea from Calais to Bordeaux. The prizes were sold, the sailors and soldiers, who had been on the verge of mutiny, were paid, and France, it was said, would provide the means for her own ruin.

In 1631, Penington, with his flag in the Convertine, was appointed Admiral of the Narrow Seas for second time.' He was employed on the same service through the summer of 1633 and of 1634, with his flag in the Unicorn, on board which ship he was knighted by the king on 14 April.

In 1635, in the Swiftsure, he was rear admiral of the fleet under the Earl of Lindsey, Sir William Monson being the vice-admiral; and on Lindsey and Monson leaving the fleet in October, Penington remained in command of the winter guard.

=== Downfall ===
In the following years he was still on the same service, and in September 1639 was lying in the Downs with a strong squadron, when the Spanish fleet for Dunkirk, with a large body of troops on board, was driven in by the Dutch fleet under the command of Tromp, which also came in and anchored in the Downs. Penington insisted that the two enemies should respect the neutrality of the roadstead; but he had a very insufficient force, and the orders he received from the king were confused and contradictory. Oquendo, the Spanish admiral, and Tromp had both, in fact, appealed to King Charles, who, hardly pressed for money by reason of the Scottish war, hoped to make some advantage out of one or the other, but was unable to decide which would pay the better; and before he could make up his mind, Tromp, probably on a hint from Richelieu, took the matter into his own hands, and on 11 October, having been joined by large reinforcements from Holland, attacked the Spanish fleet, drove many of their ships on shore, pursued those that fled, and captured or sank the greater part.

Penington, meantime, was powerless; he had no instructions to take part with either, and was disinclined to risk the total loss of his fleet by defending the Spaniards. It may, indeed, be doubted if his fleet would have obeyed him had he attempted to do so, for the popular opinion was that the Spanish fleet was there on the invitation of Charles, and that the troops it carried were to be landed to help in crushing English liberties. For the deliverance from this fancied danger the nation was grateful to the Dutch; but that Penington had had no hand in it, and had appeared rather as a supporter of the Spaniards, was probably remembered against him when, in July 1642, the parliament, after vainly protesting against the king's appointment of Penington as Lord High Admiral, ordered the Earl of Warwick to take command of the fleet and not to allow Penington on board. The hesitation in the fleet when Warwick assumed the command was largely nominal (resistance being confined to five captains, of whom three promptly submitted), and, with Penington's rejection, the navy declared itself on the side of the parliament.

That the popular feeling mistrusted Penington was evident. Clarendon says that 'he was a very honest gentleman, and of unshaken faithfulness and integrity to the king;' and though the lords 'pretended that they had many things to object against him, the greatest was that he had conveyed the Lord Digby over sea, though they well knew that for that he had the king's warrant'. But in fact the objection was that throughout his whole career he had shown himself to the people as preferring the will of the king to the welfare of the nation or even his own honour.

Older sources claim that Penington played a negligible role in the Civil War, a titular Lord High Admiral of England without any fleet to command. In fact, Penington soon took command of a revived Royalist navy as Admiral of the Fleet. After the capture of Bristol in July 1643, eighteen Royal Navy ships joined the king's cause, supported by hired merchant ships, privateers, and troop-transports. Admiral Sir John Penington remained in active command of King Charles's navy until at least May 1645.

=== Death ===
One Royalist chronicler says that Penington died in Bristol in September 1646, long after its fall to the Parliament forces. Some modern sources, however, say he died at the family seat of Muncaster in North-West England. What is clear that his will was proved 28 May 1648. Penington was unmarried, and left legacies to various relatives; among others, his 'Great Heart diamond ring' to his cousin William Pennington of Muncaster, who became ancestor of the barons of Muncaster.
