= Henry Palmer (Royal Navy officer, died 1611) =

Rear-Admiral Sir Henry Palmer
- Born: c. 1550
- Died: 1611
- Military career
- Allegiance: England
- Branch: Royal Navy
- Commands: Rear-Admiral of the Narrow Seas; Comptroller of the Navy

Rear-Admiral Sir Henry Palmer (c. 1550 – 1611) was an English naval commander and Comptroller of the Navy at Chatham Dokyard where he held office overlooking the mast pools.

Famously the naval officer best known for being sent to Dover to collect fireships to use against the armada threat. His sons Sir Henry and Levin were his only issue whereby Sir Henry jnr followed his father into the navy and took over his commissions after his fathers death. Sir Henry married into the Palmers of Dorney court via Phoebe Palmer, the marriage was known as a 'marriage of cousins'. A fine portrait of Sir Henry Palmer¹ hangs in Buckland Abbey and a portrait of hus son Sir Henry hangs prominently at Dorney Court near Windsor.

== Life ==
His family was from Tottington by Aylesford. He is first mentioned as commanding a squadron of the queen's ships on the coast of Flanders in 1576. From that time he was constantly employed in the queen's service. In 1580 and following years he was a commissioner for the repair and maintenance of Dover harbour. In 1587 he had command of a squadron before Dunkirk, and in 1588, in Antelope, commanded in the third post under Lord Henry Seymour in the "Narrow Seas", against the Spanish Armada. When this squadron joined the fleet under the lord admiral before Calais on 27 July, Palmer was sent to Dover to order out vessels suitable to be used for fireships. Before these could be sent, fireships, hastily improvised, drove the enemy from their anchorage, and Palmer, rejoining Seymour, took apart in the battle of Gravelines on the 29th. When Seymour, with the squadron of the Narrow Seas, was ordered back from the pursuit of the Spanish, Palmer returned with him, and continued with him and afterwards with the fleet till the end of the season. He remained in command of the winter guard on the coast of Flanders.

Through the next year he continued to command in the Narrow Seas, and in September convoyed the army across to Normandy. He was employed in similar service throughout the war, his squadron sometimes cruising to the coast of Cornwall, or to Ireland, but remaining for the most part in the Narrow Seas, and in 1596 blockading Calais. On 20 December 1598 he was appointed Comptroller of the Navy, in place of William Borough, and in 1600 had command of the defences of the River Thames. In 1601 he again commanded on the coast of Holland.

After the peace, he continued in the office of comptroller at his office held at Chatham Dockyard overlooking the mast pools till his death. He died on 20 November 1611 at Howlets in Bekesborne, an estate which he had bought.

== Family ==
He was twice married: first to Jane, daughter of Edward Isaac, and widow of Nicholas Sidley; secondly, to Dorothy, née Scott, and widow of Thomas Hernden. By his first wife he had two sons, of whom the younger, Henry, succeeded his father as comptroller of the navy by a grant in reversion of 17 August 1611. Howlets was left to Palmer's stepson, Isaac Sidley, who made it over to his half-brother Henry. His other son was called Levin and little is known about his life

He was the executor of his close friend Sir John Hawkins and for this task he was bequeathed a diamond worth £20

Military offices
Preceded by William Borough	Comptroller of the Navy; 1598–1611	Succeeded by Sir Guylford Slingsby
Preceded by Sir Guylford Slingsby	Comptroller of the Navy; 1632–1641	Succeeded by Vice-Admiral Sir George Carteret
