= John Malyn =

Seaman, shipowner and Navy officer

- Born: England
- Died: 5 April 1563; Rye, East Sussex, England
- Military career
- Allegiance: England
- Branch: Royal Navy
- Service years: 1540–1563
- Rank: Admiral
- Commands: HMS Falcon; HMS Jennet; HMS Willougby; HMS Grehound; Vice-Admiral of the Narrow Seas; Admiral of the Narrow Seas
- Conflicts: Sieges of Boulogne (1544–46); Battle of Gravelines (1558)

Admiral Sir John Malyn or Malen (died 5 April 1563), was a seaman, shipowner and later senior officer of the English Navy Royal who served under Henry VIII, Edward VI, and Mary I. He died at sea off the coast of Rye, East Sussex, England whilst in command of his ship HMS Grehound that was wrecked after hitting an unseen sandbar.

== Naval career ==
John Malyn began his career as a private ship owner and seaman when he was based in Calais, France in 1540. In October 1544 his ships and hoys were hired to assist in the transportation of troops returning from the Sieges of Boulogne (1544–46). In August 1554 he was appointed Captain of HMS Falcon a pinnace and assigned to patrolling duties off the East Anglian coast. In September 1556 he was appointed under the command of Lord High Admiral of England Lord Effingham to escort Charles V, Holy Roman Emperor to Spain.

From November 1558 to January 1559 he was appointed Vice-Admiral of the Narrow Seas and charged with protecting England's trade interests in the area. He took part in the Battle of Gravelines (1558) whilst commanding the Narrow Seas Squadron on approach to Calais he observed the French Army troop lines and maneuvered his ships close inshore, thus running the risk of beaching he then opened fire on them; his actions were personally noted in a letter from the Queen thanking him and granted him a pension. Malyn was probably the only naval commander to achieve some level of significance during the Queen Mary's Anglo-French Wars of (1557–59) as part of the wider Italian War of (1551-1559).

He commanded HMS Jennet during an expedition to Scotland from 1560 to early 1561. Towards the end of 1561 he was appointed Admiral of a squadron that was responsible for transporting military equipment to Ireland and additionally he was also Captain of HMS Willougby until 1562. In December 1562 he was promoted to the post of Admiral of the Narrow Seas and captain of his flag ship the galleon HMS Grehound a 45-gun ship. The ship was on duties in the English Channel returning from France when it sank after hitting a sandbar off the coast of Rye, East Sussex on 5 April 1563, Malyn was lost at sea.

== Family ==
Following his death in April 1563 his widow Elizabeth Malyn née:? was residing at Fernfield Close, Clerkenwell, Middlesex she was granted a patent and reversion dated in August 1563 for a period of 21 years.

== Bibliography ==
1. ADLER, DANA S.; KNIGHTON, C. S.; AKER, RAYMOND; DAWSON, CHARLES; HARRIS, R. E.G. (January 1998). "NOTES". The Mariner's Mirror. 84 (1).
2. Clowes, William Laird; Markham, Clements R. (Clements Robert) (1897–1903). The royal navy, a history from the earliest times to the present. London, En gland: S. Low, Marston.
3. Glasgow, Tom (January 1967). "THE NAVY IN PHILIP AND MARY'S WAR, 1557–1558". The Mariner's Mirror. 53 (4).
4. 'Henry VIII: October 1544, 26-31', in Letters and Papers, Foreign and Domestic, Henry VIII, Volume 19 Part 2, August–December 1544, ed. James Gairdner and R H Brodie (London, 1905), British History Online http://www.british-history.ac.uk/letters-papers-hen8/vol19/no2/pp272-321 [accessed 19 February 2019]
5. Knighton, Dr C. S.; Loades, Professor David (2013). The Navy of Edward VI and Mary I. Farnham, England: Ashgate Publishing, Ltd. ISBN 9781409482406.
6. Rodger, N.A.M. (1997). The safeguard of the sea : a naval history of Britain. Vol 1., 660–1649. London: Penguin. ISBN 9780140297249.
