= Henry Palmer (priest) =

Henry Palmer (24 January 1741 – 12 April 1801) was an Anglican priest in the late eighteenth century, who died in the first year of the 19th century.

Palmer was born in County Longford. He entered Trinity College, Dublin in 1776 and graduated B.A. in 1761 and M.A. in 1764. He was appointed Archdeacon of Ossory in 1772, holding the position until his death. Palmer was also Precentor of Lismore Cathedral from 1782 to 1797.
