= Slingsby baronets =

Titles in the Baronetage of England

Escutcheon of the Slingsby baronets of Scriven

There have been four baronetcies created for members of the Slingsby family who settled at Scriven Hall in Scriven, Knaresborough, Yorkshire in the 14th century.

The Baronetcy of Slingsby of Scriven was created in the Baronetage of England on 23 October 1628 for Anthony Slingsby, Governor of Zutphen, Netherlands. It was extinct on his death in 1630. He was son of Peter, son of Simon Slingsby. Simon was third son of Marioria (daughter of Simon Poley) and John Slingsby, son and heir of John Slingsby of Scriven, chief forester of Knaresborough, and Joan, daughter of Walter Calverley, of Calverley in Yorkshire.

A second Baronetcy of Slingsby of Scriven was created in the Baronetage of Nova Scotia on 2 March 1638 for Henry Slingsby of Scriven Hall, the representative of the main line of the family and a supporter of Charles I. He was executed in 1658 during the Commonwealth of England. The second, third and fifth Baronets followed him as parliamentary representatives for Knaresbough. The second, eighth and ninth served as High Sheriff of Yorkshire. The baronetcy was dormant on the death of the tenth Baronet.

The Baronetcy of Slingsby of Bifrons, Kent was created in the Baronetage of England on 19 October 1657 for Sir Arthur Slingsby Kt., son of Sir Guylford Slingsby Kt, Comptroller of the Navy for James I and first cousin of Sir Henry above. The Baronetcy was extinct or dormant on the death of his son Sir Charles, the second Baronet. Charles sold his estate and went abroad in 1677, but nothing is known of him after that date. He is chiefly remembered as the husband of the celebrated actress Mary, Lady Slingsby (died 1694).

The Baronetcy of Slingsby of Newcells, Hertfordshire was created in the Baronetage of England on 16 March 1660 for Robert Slingsby, (second son of Sir Guildford Slingby above and elder brother of Sir Arthur above) who married the heiress of Newcells. The baronetcy was extinct on his death.

== Slingsby of Scriven (1628) ==
- Sir Anthony Slingsby, 1st Baronet (died 1630)

== Slingsby of Scriven (1638) ==
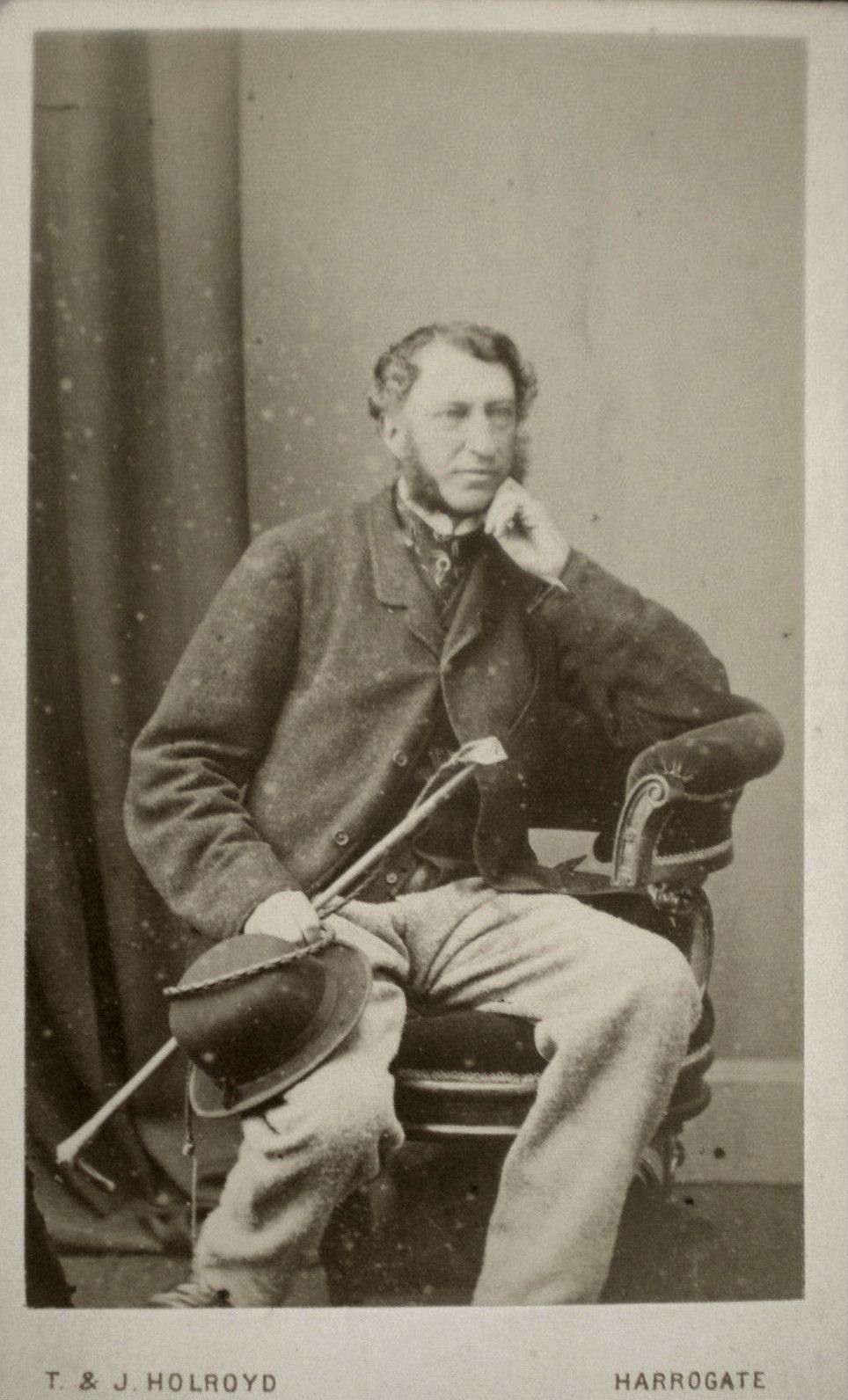
Sir Charles Slingsby 10th baronet

- Sir Henry Slingsby, 1st Baronet (1602–1658)
- Sir Thomas Slingsby, 2nd Baronet (1636–1688)
- Sir Henry Slingsby, 3rd Baronet (1660–1691)
- Sir Thomas Slingsby, 4th Baronet (1668–1726)
- Sir Henry Slingsby, 5th Baronet (1693–1763)
- Sir Thomas Slingsby, 6th Baronet (1695–1765)
- Sir Saville Slingsby 7th Baronet (1698–1780)
- Sir Thomas Turner Slingsby, 8th Baronet (1741–1806)
- Sir Thomas Slingsby, 9th Baronet (1775–1835)
- Sir Charles Slingsby, 10th Baronet (1824–1869)

== Slingsby of Bifrons, Kent (1657) ==
- Sir Arthur Slingsby, 1st Baronet (1623–1666)
- Sir Charles Slingsby, 2nd Baronet (died after 1677)

== Slingsby of Newcells, Hertfordshire (1660) ==
- Sir Robert Slingsby, 1st Baronet (1611–1661)
