= Admiral of the Narrow Seas =

British Royal Navy Post

Office of the Admiral of the Narrow Seas
- Flag of the Kingdom of England
- Reports to: Lord High Admiral, Board of Admiralty
- Nominator: Monarch of England, First Lord of the Admiralty
- Appointer: Monarch of England; Subject to formal approval by the King-in-Council
- Term length: Not fixed (usually for life)
- Inaugural holder: Vice-Admiral Sir John Pendagrast
- Formation: 1412
- Abolished: 1688

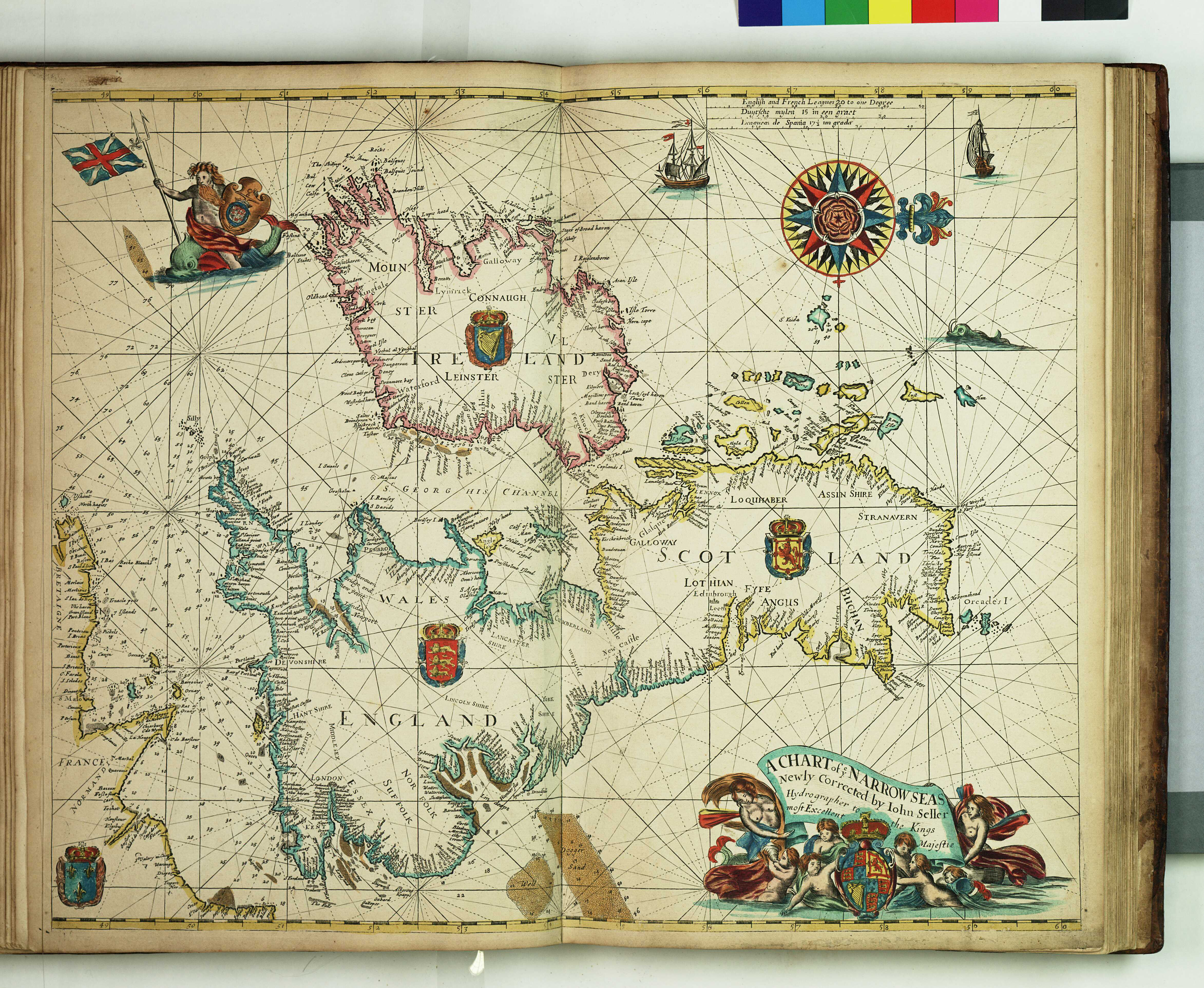
"A chart of ye narrow seas," 1675

The Admiral of the Narrow Seas also known as the Admiral for the guard of the Narrow Seas was a senior Royal Navy appointment. The post holder was chiefly responsible for the command of the English navy's Narrow Seas Squadron also known as the Eastern Squadron that operated in the two seas which lay between England and Kingdom of France (the English Channel particularly the Straits of Dover) and England and the Spanish Netherlands later the Dutch Republic (the southern North Sea) from 1412 to 1688. His subordinate units, establishments, and staff were sometimes informally known as the Command of the Narrow Seas.

== History ==
The first royal commission as Admiral to a naval officer was granted in 1303. By 1344 it was only used as a rank at sea for a captain in charge of a fleet or fleets.

In the fifteenth, sixteenth and seventeenth centuries, the Kingdom of England claimed sovereignty over certain bodies of water close to the British Isles: those between the Kingdom of France and England (the English Channel particularly the Straits of Dover) and the Spanish Netherlands later the Dutch Republic and England (the southern North Sea). As a result of England's claim of these territorial waters there was an enforceable requirement placed on any foreign ships passing through the area to acknowledge all English warships. England also exercised control over all fishing rights within the same waters.

Among the most important naval postings during these times was the Admiral of the Narrow Seas, sometimes called the Vice-Admiral of the Narrow Seas to denote that he was junior to the Lord Admiral of England. These flag officers were formally appointed by the crown. His responsibilities were to guard the narrow seas from foreign threats, protect English fishing vessels and enforce English sovereignty over said waters.

Claims to the narrow seas lasted until the United Kingdom of Great Britain and Ireland, along with other European countries, agreed to set a new three-mile limit in 1822.

== Office holders ==
Admiral/General at Sea/Vice-Admiral/Rear-Admiral Narrow Seas
rank	name	date/s	notes	ref
Vice-Admiral	Sir John Pendagrast	1412	Commanding the Narrow Seas	
office is presumed vacant (1413–1522)
Vice-Admiral	William FitzWilliam	1523–1524	also vice-admiral channel squadron/fleet	
Vice-Admiral	Sir John Dudley	1537		
Vice-Admiral	Sir Rhys Mansell	June 1543		
Vice-Admiral	Sir William Woodhouse	1544–1545		
Vice-Admiral	Sir Thomas Cotton	May. 1549		
Vice-Admiral	Sir Henry Dudley	26 March, 1552		
Admiral	William Driver	December 1552 – January 1553		
Vice-Admiral	Sir John Malen	1557–1558		
Vice-Admiral	Sir Ralph Chamberlain	September–October 1558		
Vice-Admiral	Sir John Malyn	November 1558 – January 1559		
Admiral	Sir John Malen	February 1563 – April 1563	lost with his ship off Rye	
Vice-Admiral	Sir John Hawkins	May – July 1563		
Vice-Admiral	Sir William Holstocke	August 1562 – October 1563		
Vice-Admiral	Sir Thomas Cotton	August–September 1563		
Rear-Admiral	Henry Palmer	1587		
Vice-Admiral	Lord Henry Seymour	1588		
Vice-Admiral	Sir Martin Frobisher	September 1589 – 1590		
Admiral	Luke Warde	1590–1591		
Admiral	Sir Richard Leveson	1598–1601		
Rear-Admiral	Sir Robert Mansell	c. 1599		
Vice-Admiral	Sir Robert Mansell	1602–1604		
Vice-Admiral	Sir William Monson	August 1604 – 1613		
Vice-Admiral	Sir Francis Howard	1613 – 13 January 1616		
Admiral	Sir Francis Howard	14 January 1616 – 1618		
Admiral	Sir Henry Mervyn	1619–1623		
Rear-Admiral	Sir John Penington	1623–1626	as Rear-Admiral for the Guard of the Narrow Seas	
Rear-Admiral	Sir John Penington	1631–1634	as Rear-Admiral for the Guard of the Narrow Seas	
Vice-Admiral	Robert Bertie, 3rd Earl of Lindsey	1635–1639		
Vice-Admiral	Sir John Penington	1641–1642		
Admiral	Robert Rich, 3rd Earl of Warwick	1643		
Vice-Admiral	Sir Thomas Rainsborough	1643–1644	also vice-admiral in the channel	
General-at-Sea	Sir Robert Blake	1652–1657	Commanding in the channel, and at the Downs	
Vice-Admiral	Sir John Lawson	1665		
Vice-Admiral	Sir Edward Montagu, 1st Earl Sandwich	July 1657 – 1658		
Admiral	Sir Edward Montagu 1st Earl Sandwich	June 1661 – 1665		
Vice-Admiral	Sir John Kempthorne	1678		
Vice-Admiral	Sir William Poole	1679		
Vice-Admiral	Henry FitzRoy, 1st Duke of Grafton	1685–1687		
Admiral	Sir Roger Strickland	1687–1688	rank as Admiral of the Blue	

== See also ==
- Admiral of the South, North and West
- Admiral of the West
- Admiral of the North
- Admiral of the North and West
- Battle of the Narrow Seas
