= William Milner =

William Milner may refer to:

- Sir William Milner, 1st Baronet, MP for York
- Sir William Milner, 3rd Baronet, MP for York
- Sir William Milner, 5th Baronet, MP for York
- Sir William Frederick Victor Mordaunt Milner, 8th Baronet, of the Milner Baronets
- William Milner (died 1942), station foreman at York railway station, killed by bombing in World War II
