= Sir Thomas Slingsby, 2nd Baronet =

English landowner and Member of Parliament

Member of Parliament for Scarborough
- In office 1685-1689

Member of Parliament for Knaresborough
- In office 1679-1685

Member of Parliament for Yorkshire
- In office 1670-1679

High Sheriff of Yorkshire
- In office 1660

Personal details
- Spouse: Dorothy Cradock (m. 1658; died 1673)
- Children: 3, including Barbara
- Relatives: Richard Arundell (grandson)

Sir Thomas Slingsby, 2nd Baronet (15 June 1636 – 1 March 1688), of Scriven in Yorkshire, was an English landowner and Member of Parliament.

== Biography ==
He was the second but oldest surviving son of Sir Henry Slingsby, executed in 1658 for his adherence to the Royalist cause during the English Civil War. The family estates were confiscated, but were restored following the Restoration in 1660.

He was High Sheriff of Yorkshire in 1660 and entered Parliament in 1670 as member for Yorkshire, and subsequently also represented Knaresborough (the family borough) and Scarborough.

In 1658 he married Dorothy Cradock (d. 1673), daughter of George Cradock of Caverswall Castle, and they had three children:

- Sir Henry Slingsby, 3rd Baronet (c. 1660 – 1691), his heir, also MP for Knaresborough, who died unmarried
- Sir Thomas Slingsby, 4th Baronet (c. 1668 – 1726), who succeeded his brother
- Barbara, Countess of Pembroke (d. 1722), who married three times – to Sir Richard Mauliverer of Allerton Mauliverer (d. 1689), to The Lord Arundell of Trerice (1649–1698), and to The Earl of Pembroke (1656–1733).

Parliament of England
Preceded by Conyers Darcy; Sir John Goodricke	Member of Parliament for Yorkshire; 1670–1679; With: Conyers Darcy	Succeeded by Viscount Dungarvan; The Lord Fairfax of Cameron
Preceded by William Stockdale; Sir John Talbot	Member of Parliament for Knaresborough; 1679–1685; With: William Stockdale	Succeeded by William Stockdale; Henry Slingsby
Preceded by Francis Thompson; William Thompson	Member of Parliament for Scarborough; 1685–1689; With: William Osbaldeston	Succeeded by Francis Thompson; William Thompson
Baronetage of Nova Scotia
Preceded by Henry Slingsby	Baronet (of Scriven); 1658–1688	Succeeded by Henry Slingsby
Honorary titles
Preceded by Robert Waters	High Sheriff of Yorkshire; 1660	Succeeded by Sir Thomas Osborne
