= Henry Bethell =

Member of the Parliament of England

Henry Bethell (c. 1606 – 1668) was an English politician who sat in the House of Commons in 1660.

Bethell was the son of Sir Walter Bethell (died 1622) of Alne and his wife Mary Slingsby, daughter of Sir Henry Slingsby of Scriven, Knaresborough and Frances Vavasour. His mother was a puritan and attended a conventicle at York. In 1645, he was commissioner of the northern association for the West Riding of Yorkshire. He was J.P. for the North Riding from 1649 to 1653 and from 1656 to 1659. He was commissioner for militia for Yorkshire in March 1660. He signed the Yorkshire declaration for a free Parliament and in April 1660, he was elected Member of Parliament for Knaresborough in the Convention Parliament. He was JP again from July 1660 until his death and commissioner for assessment for the North Riding from August 1660 to 1661. He was commissioner for assessment for North Riding from 1664 until his death and a captain of the foot militia for North Riding from about 1665 until his death.

Bethell was unmarried and died at the age of about 61 and was buried at Alne on 27 February 1668. He was the brother of Slingsby Bethel.

Parliament of England
Preceded by Not represented in Restored Rump	Member of Parliament for Knaresborough; 1660; With: William Stockdale	Succeeded by William Stockdale; Sir John Talbot
