= Andrew Lawson (MP) =

British politician

Member of Parliament for Knaresborough
- In office 29 June 1841 – 29 August 1847 Serving with William Ferrand
- Preceded by: Henry Rich; Charles Langdale
- Succeeded by: William Lascelles; Joshua Westhead
- In office 8 January 1835 – 24 July 1837 Serving with John Richards
- Preceded by: John Richards; Benjamin Rotch
- Succeeded by: Henry Rich; Charles Langdale

Personal details
- Born: 1800
- Died: 28 February 1853 (aged 52–53)
- Party: Conservative

Andrew Lawson (1800 – 28 February 1853) of Aldborough Lodge and Boroughbridge Hall, both in Yorkshire, and of 26 Pall Mall, London, was a British Conservative politician.

After unsuccessfully contesting the 1832 general election at Knaresborough, Lawson was elected Conservative Member of Parliament (MP) for the same constituency at the 1835 general election. He, however, lost the seat two years later, before regaining it in 1841 and holding it until 1847, when he was again defeated. Once more, he contested the seat at a by-election in 1851, but was unsuccessful.

Parliament of the United Kingdom
Preceded by John Richards; Benjamin Rotch	Member of Parliament for Knaresborough; 1835–1837; With: John Richards	Succeeded by Henry Rich; Charles Langdale
Preceded by Henry Rich; Charles Langdale	Member of Parliament for Knaresborough; 1841–1847; With: William Ferrand	Succeeded by William Lascelles; Joshua Westhead
