= Barbara Herbert =

Barbara Herbert may refer to:

- Barbara Herbert, Countess of Powis (1735–1786)
- Barbara Herbert, Countess of Pembroke (c.1668–1721), British court official and noble
