= John Richards (British politician) =

English politician

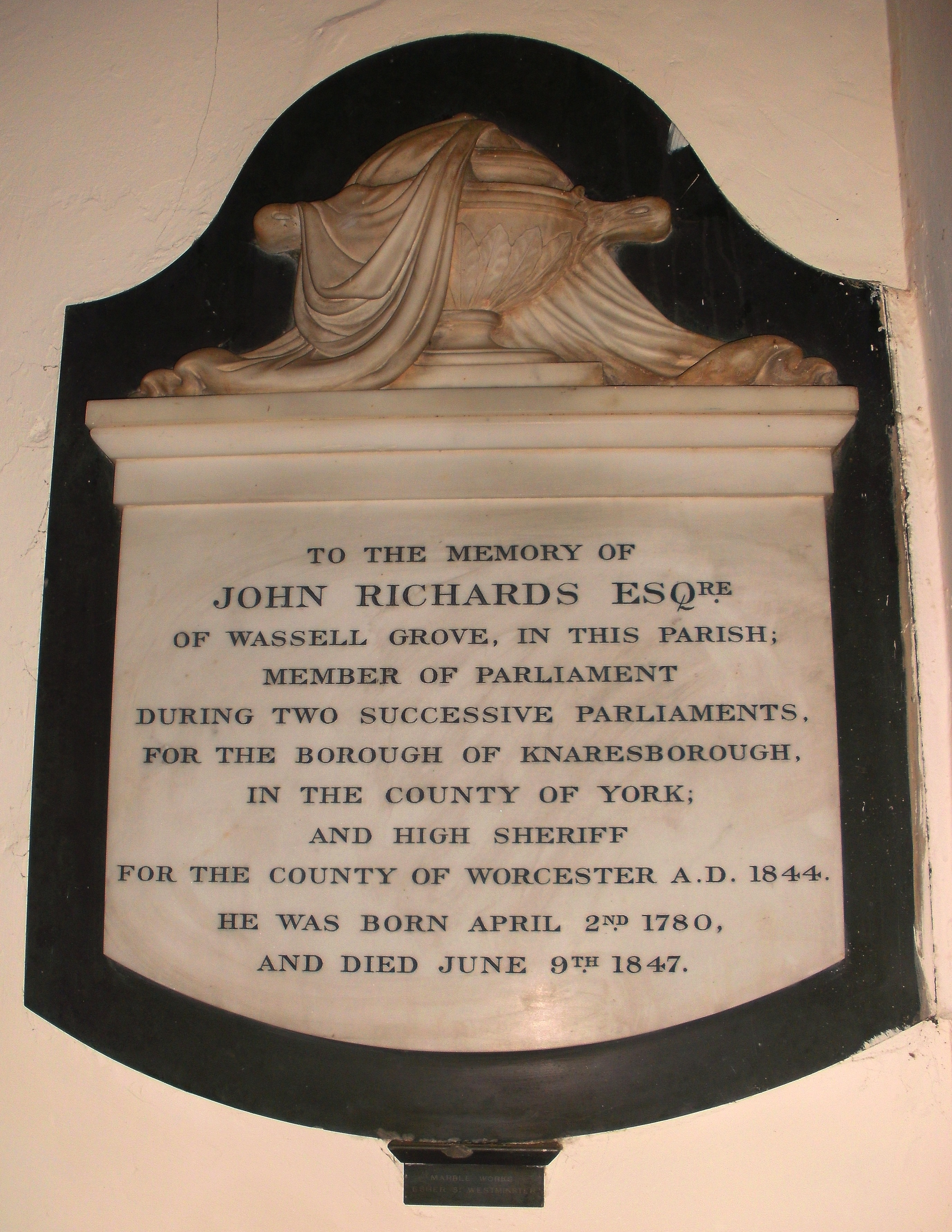
St John the Baptist Church, Hagley, memorial to John Richards MP

John Richards (2 April 1780 – 9 June 1847) was an English politician who sat in the House of Commons between 1832 and 1837.

== Life ==
Richards was from Wassell Grove in the parish of Hagley, Worcestershire. He served as MP for Knaresborough in Yorkshire between December 1832 and 1837, and became High Sheriff of Worcestershire in 1844.

There is a wall tablet commemorating him in St John the Baptist Church, Hagley.

Parliament of the United Kingdom
Preceded by Hon. William Ponsonby; The Lord Waterpark	Member of Parliament for Knaresborough; December 1832–1835; With: Benjamin Rotch	Succeeded by himself Andrew Lawson
Preceded by himself Benjamin Rotch	Member of Parliament for Knaresborough; 1835–1837; With: Andrew Lawson	Succeeded by Henry Rich; Hon Charles Langdale
