= John George Smyth =

John George Smyth may refer to:

- Sir John Smyth, 1st Baronet (1893–1983), British Indian Army officer and member of parliament for Norwood
- John George Smyth (1815–1869), member of parliament for the City of York
