= Henry Redhead Yorke (British politician) =

British Whig politician

Henry Galgacus Redhead Yorke

Member of Parliament for City of York
- In office 30 June 1841 – 1848 Serving with John George Smyth (1847–1848); John Lowther (1841–1847)
- Preceded by: John Lowther; John Dundas
- Succeeded by: John George Smyth; William Milner

Personal details
- Born: 9 December 1802
- Died: 12 May 1848 (aged 45)
- Cause of death: Suicide
- Party: Whig
- Spouse: Elizabeth Crosbie (m. 1837)
- Parent: Henry Redhead Yorke
- Education: Christ's College, Cambridge

Henry Galgacus Redhead Yorke (9 December 1802 – 12 May 1848) was a British Whig politician.

== Early life ==
He was the son of Henry Redhead Yorke and Jane William Andrews, whose father was Keeper of Dorchester Castle, where the elder Henry had been jailed. His father was a West Indian creole of African/British descent; his mother, Sarah Bullock, was a manumitted slave from Barbuda and his father was an Antiguan plantation owner and manager. The younger Henry was baptised in Farnham, Surrey in 1805, with the middle name of an ancient British leader, Galgacus. His father died when he was 10 and his three sisters all died in childhood, with only Henry and his brother George reaching adulthood.

Yorke was educated at Charterhouse (1811), then Eton. He was admitted as a pensioner to Christ's College, Cambridge in 1825, where he stayed seven terms. About 1822, he began tutoring two grandsons of Francis Dashwood and he and his brother then demanded money from Francis' daughter Fanny, causing a scandal.

== Family ==
He married Elizabeth Cecilia Crosbie, daughter of William Crosbie, 4th Baron Brandon and Elizabeth La Touche, on 26 December 1837 at the British Chaplaincy in Geneva. Her parents' marriage was notoriously unhappy, and resulted in scandal when her father publicly accused her mother of adultery with a Cabinet Minister, William Lamb, 2nd Viscount Melbourne, although the adultery was never proved. They had a daughter and two sons, Louisa, Henry Francis, and George Galgacus Aylmer, the first two born at Syston Park, Lincolnshire.

== Political career ==
Yorke was elected Whig Member of Parliament for City of York at the 1841 general election; the constituency returned two members and Yorke received 1552 votes (behind John Lowther on 1625). He was reelected, unopposed, in 1847, holding the seat until his death the following year. While an MP, regarding himself as a reformer, he lived on Eaton Square and joined the Reform Club. He is the third MP identified by the History of Parliament’s House of Commons 1832-68 project as of mixed ethnicity.

== Death ==
In May 1848 he bought Prussic acid (cyanide) saying it was to put a dog down, then swallowed it in Regent's Park, London, near Gloucester Gate, with several witnesses. The verdict of the coroner (who found his brain was inflamed and vascularised) and a jury was that he had been "not in his right mind". An obituary appeared in The Gentleman's Magazine.

Parliament of the United Kingdom
Preceded by John Lowther; John Dundas	Member of Parliament for City of York; 1841–1848; With: John George Smyth (1847–1848); John Lowther (1841–1847)	Succeeded by John George Smyth; William Milner
