= Sir John Lowther, 2nd Baronet, of Swillington =

British politician (1793–1868)

Sir John Henry Lowther, 2nd Baronet (23 March 1793 – 23 June 1868) was a Tory MP in the British Parliament. He was the eldest son of Sir John Lowther, 1st Baronet, whom he succeeded on 11 May 1844.

He represented Cockermouth in 1816–1826, Wigtown Burghs in 1826–1831, Cockermouth again in 1831–1832, and York in 1835–1847. He then served as High Sheriff of Yorkshire for 1852–53.

He died unmarried, and was succeeded by his brother Charles Hugh Lowther.

Parliament of the United Kingdom
Preceded by Augustus John Foster; Thomas Wallace	Member of Parliament for Cockermouth; 1816–1826; With: Thomas Wallace 1816–1818; John Beckett 1818–1821; William Wilson Carus-Wilson 1821–1826	Succeeded by William Wilson Carus-Wilson; Lord Gairlies
Preceded by Nicholas Conyngham Tindal	Member of Parliament for Wigtown Burghs; 1826–1831	Succeeded by Edward Stewart
Preceded by Lord Garlies; Hon. Philip Pleydell-Bouverie	Member of Parliament for Cockermouth; 1831–1832; With: Sir James Scarlett	Succeeded by Fretchville Lawson Ballantine Dykes; Henry Aglionby Aglionby
Preceded by Edward Robert Petre; Thomas Dundas	Member of Parliament for York; 1835–1847; With: Hon. John Dundas 1835–1841; Henry Redhead Yorke 1841–1847	Succeeded by Henry Redhead Yorke; John George Smyth
Baronetage of the United Kingdom
Preceded by John Lowther	Baronet (of Swillington); 1844–1868	Succeeded by Charles Lowther
