= Charles Stourton =

Charles Stourton may refer to:

- Charles Stourton, 8th Baron Stourton (c. 1520–1557), English peer
- Charles Stourton, 15th Baron Stourton (1702–1753), English peer
- Charles Stourton, 17th Baron Stourton (1752–1816), English peer
- Charles Langdale (born Charles Stourton; 1787–1868), English politician and leading Roman Catholic layman during the 19th century
- Charles Stourton, 19th Baron Stourton (1802–1872), English peer
- Charles Stourton, 24th Baron Mowbray (1867–1936), English peer
- Charles Stourton, 26th Baron Mowbray (1923–2006), English peer and politician
