= Isaac Holden =

British inventor and manufacturer (1807–1897)

Sir Isaac Holden Bt
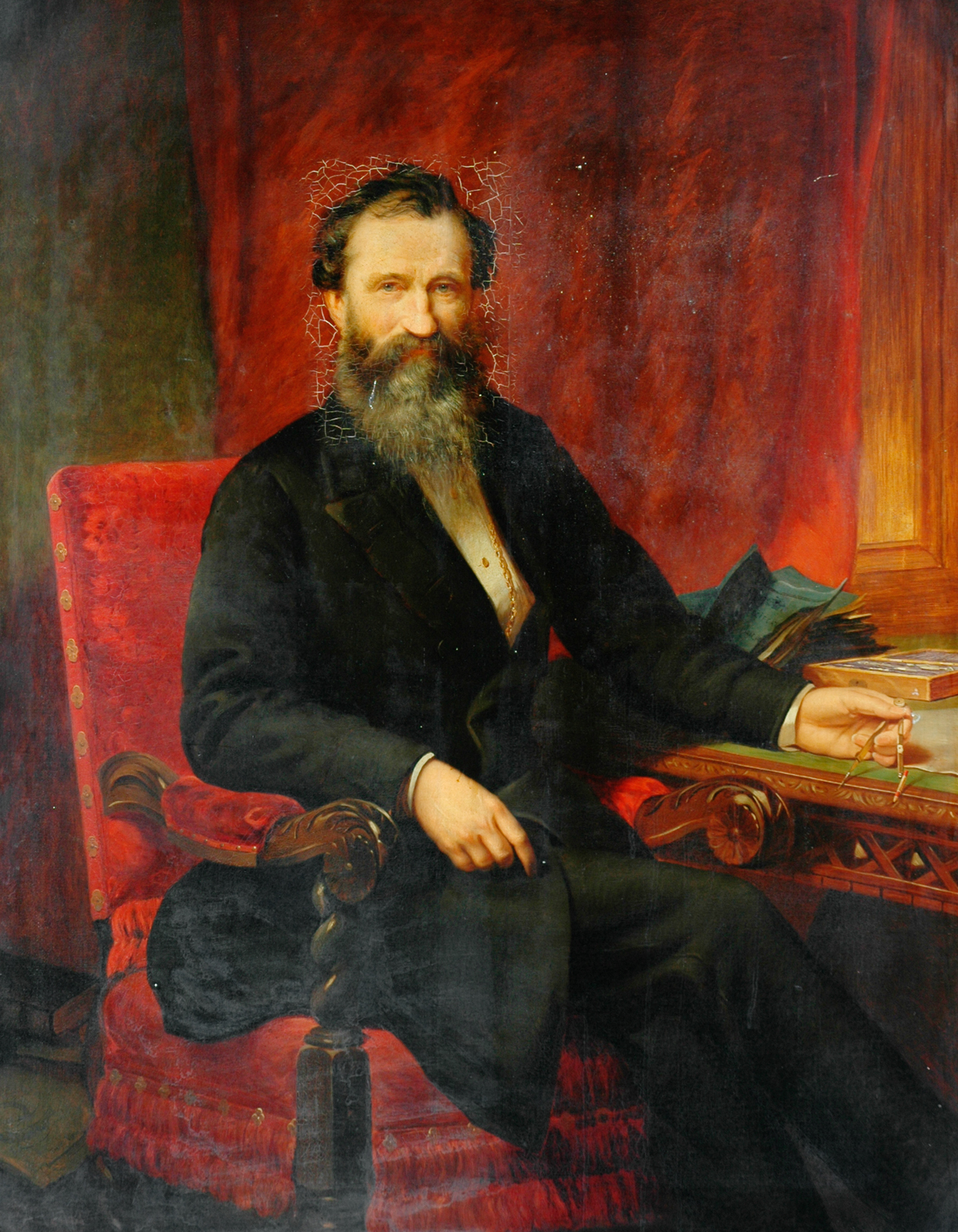
- Holden in 1868, painted by Samuel Sidley
- Born: 7 May 1807; Hurlet, Renfrewshire, Scotland
- Died: 13 August 1897 (aged 90); Oakworth, Yorkshire, England
- Resting place: Undercliffe Cemetery, Bradford
- Occupations: inventor and politician

Sir Isaac Holden, 1st Baronet (7 May 1807 – 13 August 1897) was an inventor and manufacturer, who is known both for his work in developing the Square Motion wool-combing machine and as a Radical Liberal Member of Parliament.

== Life ==
Holden was born in the village of Hurlet near Glasgow. He was largely self-educated: his formal education was often disrupted. He was apprenticed from the age of ten for a short period as a draw boy for two hand weavers, but attended the grammar school run by the 'Old Radical' John Fraser. He became a pupil-teacher and then sought to become a Wesleyan Minister, before teaching at schools in Slaithwaite and Leeds.

In 1829 Holden obtained a post at the Castle Academy in Reading, Berkshire. It was here that he developed a version of the Lucifer match, but his invention was superseded by John Walker of Stockton-on-Tees in 1827, who did not patent the invention. The following year Holden returned to Scotland to set up a night school in Glasgow, but after a brief period of teaching he moved in 1830 to become a bookkeeper at Townsends' worsted factory in Cullingworth near Bingley. Transferring to the technical side and becoming a manager, he spent his time at seeking to improve the process of combing wool.

Holden left Townsends in 1846 to set up a factory making Paisley shawl middles at Pit Lane in Bradford. When the business failed two years later he formed a partnership with Samuel Lister. They worked together to develop the square motion wool-combing machine, which was patented by Lister in 1848, although Holden had drafted the patent. The origins of the machine became the subject of a lifelong dispute between the two men.

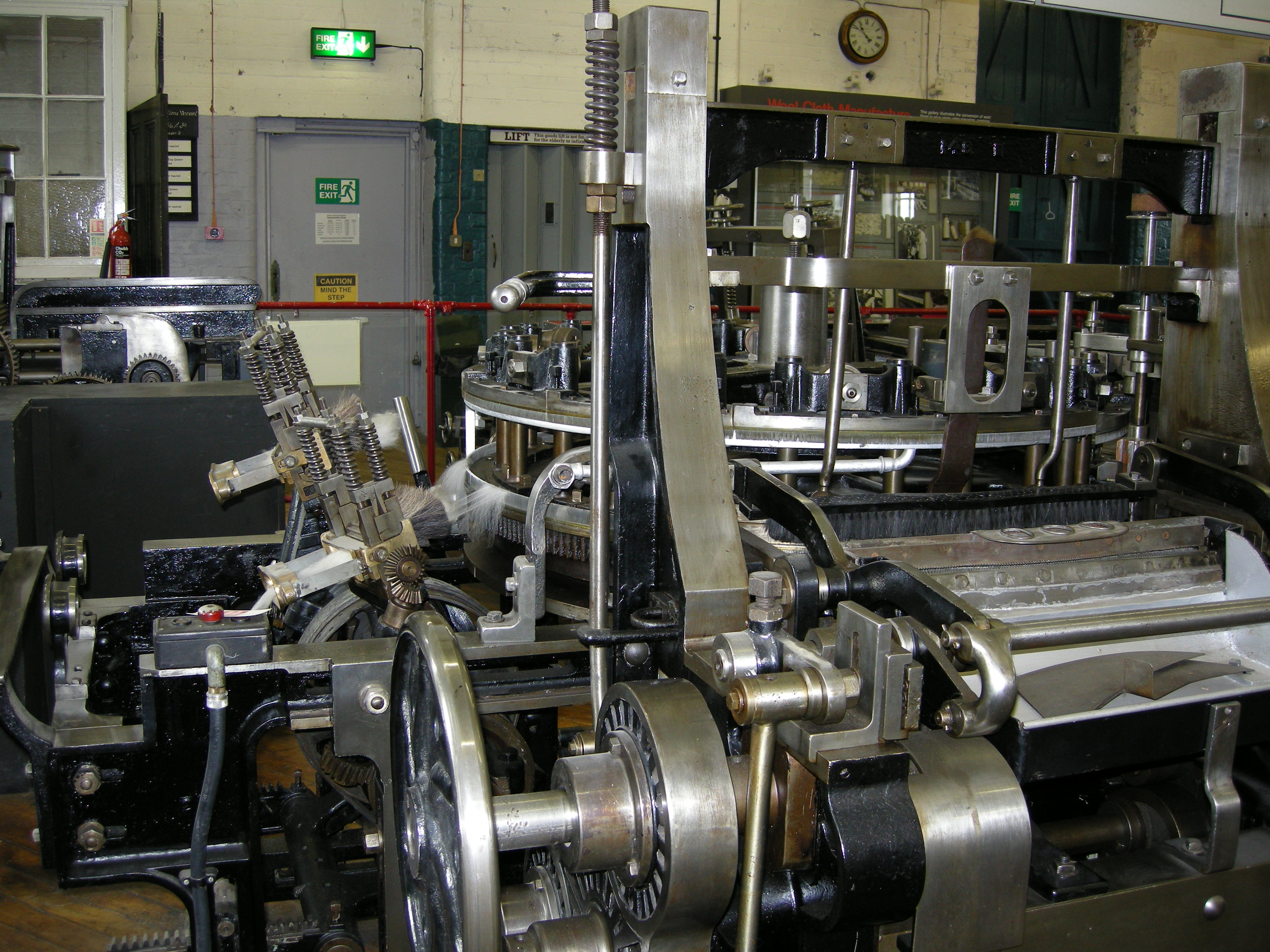
Holden comb

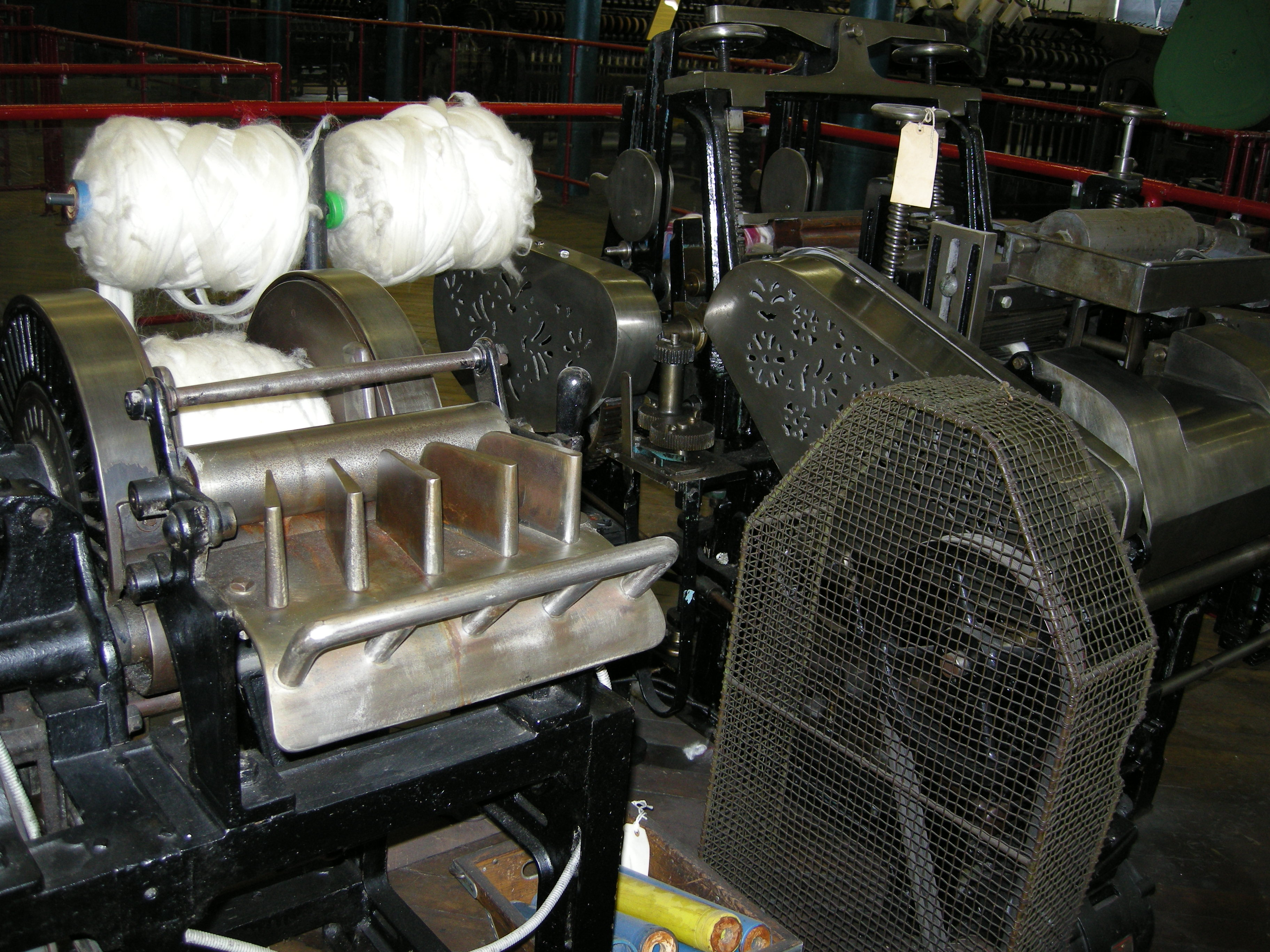
Combing machine at Bradford Industrial Museum

In 1848, trading as Lister & Holden, Isaac Holden set up a factory in the St Denis district of Paris, where over the next few years he perfected the square motion machine. He then set up factories in France, at Croix near Lille and at Reims, run by his nephews Isaac Holden Crothers and Jonathon Holden. In 1857 he bought out Lister and the firm was renamed Isaac Holden et Fils. In 1860 he and his sons, Angus and Edward, set up an experimental factory at Penny Oaks in Bradford and then in 1864 they opened the massive Alston Works at Bradford.

By the 1870s Holden's factories in England and France had become the largest wool combers in the world. He celebrated his success by building a large Italianate mansion at Oakworth near Keighley in Yorkshire. As a leading Wesleyan, Holden's philanthropy was largely concentrated on building Wesleyan chapels. He pledged £5000 to build 50 chapels in London.

In 1865 Holden was elected to serve as a Liberal Member of Parliament for Knaresborough from 1865 to 1868, and later for the Northern West Riding of Yorkshire from 1882 to 1885 and for Keighley from 1885 to 1895. In his political life he campaigned for electoral reform, church disestablishment and Irish Home Rule. In 1893, at the age of 86, he was created a Baronet, of Oakworth House in the County of York.

Holden died in August 1897, aged 90, and was buried in Undercliffe Cemetery, Bradford. He was succeeded in the baronetcy by his eldest son Angus Holden. His daughter Margaret had married Alfred Illingworth who succeeded him as MP for Knaresborough. In 1908 his son was raised to the peerage as Baron Holden.

Oakworth House burned down in 1907 and in 1927 its grounds were given by the family to the people of Oakworth as a public park. It is called Holden Park.

== Family ==
Holden was twice married: firstly in 1832 to Marion Love (1811–1847) with whom he had four children; secondly in 1850 to Sarah Sugden (1804–1890) by whom he had no further children.

Holden`s younger son Edward Holden (1835–1913) was chairman of the West Lancashire Railway, and of the Liverpool, Southport and Preston Junction Railway. He was "greatly interested in the public activities of Southport".

Parliament of the United Kingdom
Preceded by Basil Thomas Woodd; Thomas Collins	Member of Parliament for Knaresborough; 1865–1868; With: Basil Thomas Woodd	Succeeded by Alfred Illingworth
Preceded by Sir Mathew Wilson; Lord Frederick Cavendish	Member of Parliament for Northern West Riding of Yorkshire; 1882–1885; With: Sir Mathew Wilson	Constituency abolished
New constituency	Member of Parliament for Keighley; 1885–1895	Succeeded by Sir John Brigg
Baronetage of the United Kingdom
New creation	Baronet (of Oakworth House); 1893–1897	Succeeded by Angus Holden
