= Alfred Illingworth =

English worsted spinner and Liberal politician

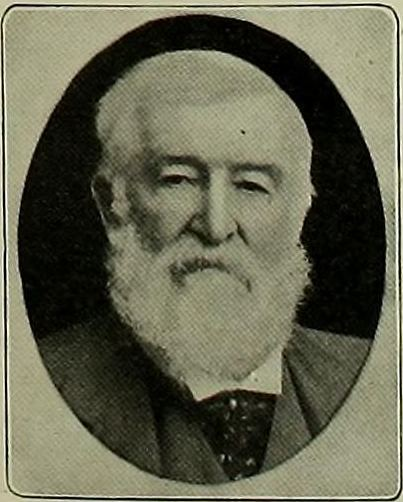

Member of Parliament for Bradford West Bradford (1880–1885)
- In office 27 April 1880 – 13 July 1895
- Preceded by: Henry Ripley
- Succeeded by: Ernest Flower

Member of Parliament for Knaresborough
- In office 7 December 1868 – 31 January 1874
- Preceded by: Basil Thomas Woodd
- Succeeded by: Basil Thomas Woodd

Personal details
- Born: 25 September 1827 Bradford, Yorkshire, UK
- Died: 1907 (aged 79–80)
- Party: Liberal
- Spouse: Margaret Holden
- Parents: Daniel Illingworth (father); Elizabeth Hill (mother)
- Relatives: Percy Illingworth (nephew); Albert Illingworth (nephew)
- Education: Huddersfield College

Alfred Illingworth (25 September 1827 – 1907), was an English worsted spinner and Liberal politician who sat in the House of Commons in two periods between 1868 and 1895.

== Background and education ==
Illingworth was born at Bradford, Yorkshire, the son of Daniel Illingworth and his wife Elizabeth Hill. He was educated at Huddersfield College and entered the family worsted spinning business of D Illingworth & Sons at the age of 16.

In 1865, with his brother Henry, he established the Whetley Mills, one of the largest factories in Bradford. He was also a director of the Bradford District Bank. He had strong non-conformist and free trade views and joined politics.

== Political career ==
At the 1868 general election, Illingworth was elected MP for Knaresborough, but lost the seat in 1874. He was then elected at Bradford at the 1880 general election until the constituency was reorganised under the Redistribution of Seats Act 1885. At the 1885 general election he was elected for Bradford West and held the seat until 1895.

== Post politics ==
He received the freedom of the city of Bradford on 24 October 1902, ″for eminent service rendered to the city during his career″.

== Personal life ==
Illingworth married Margaret Holden, daughter of Sir Isaac Holden, 1st Baronet in 1863 and his brother Henry married another daughter of Holden creating a strong alliance of two of the dominant Bradford families of the time. Henry was the father of Percy Illingworth and Albert Illingworth who were also active in politics in Yorkshire.

Parliament of the United Kingdom
Preceded by Basil Thomas Woodd and Isaac Holden	Member of Parliament for Knaresborough; 1868–1874	Succeeded by Basil Thomas Woodd
Preceded by Henry Ripley and William Edward Forster	Member of Parliament for Bradford; 1880–1885; With: William Edward Forster	Constituency divided
New constituency	Member of Parliament for Bradford West; 1885–1895	Succeeded by Ernest Flower
