= Henry Fisher (MP) =

16th-century English politician

Henry Fisher (by 1519 – 1566 or later) was an English politician.

He was a member (MP) of the parliament of England for Saltash in 1547, Reigate in March 1553, and Knaresborough in 1555.
