= Basil Thomas Woodd =

British politician (1815–1895)

Basil Thomas Woodd MP

Member of Parliament for Knaresborough
- In office 31 January 1874 – 31 March 1880
- Preceded by: Alfred Illingworth
- Succeeded by: Henry Meysey-Thompson
- In office 7 July 1852 – 17 November 1868 Serving with Isaac Holden (1865 – 1868); Thomas Collins (1857 – 1865); John Dent Dent (1852 – 1857)
- Preceded by: Thomas Collins; Joshua Westhead
- Succeeded by: Alfred Illingworth

Personal details
- Born: 7 July 1815
- Died: 4 June 1895 (aged 79)
- Party: Conservative

Basil Thomas Woodd (7 July 1815 – 4 June 1895) was a Conservative Party politician.

He was elected Conservative MP for Knaresborough in 1852 but lost the seat when it was reduced to one member in 1868. He then regained it in 1874 but again lost it in 1880.

Parliament of the United Kingdom
Preceded by Alfred Illingworth	Member of Parliament for Knaresborough; 1874 – 1880	Succeeded by Henry Meysey-Thompson
Preceded by Thomas Collins and Joshua Westhead	Member of Parliament for Knaresborough; 1852 – 1868; With: Isaac Holden (1865 – 1868); Thomas Collins (1857 – 1865); John Dent Dent (1852 – 1857)	Succeeded by Alfred Illingworth
