= Barbara Herbert, Countess of Pembroke =

British court official and noble

The Right Honourable The Countess of Pembroke
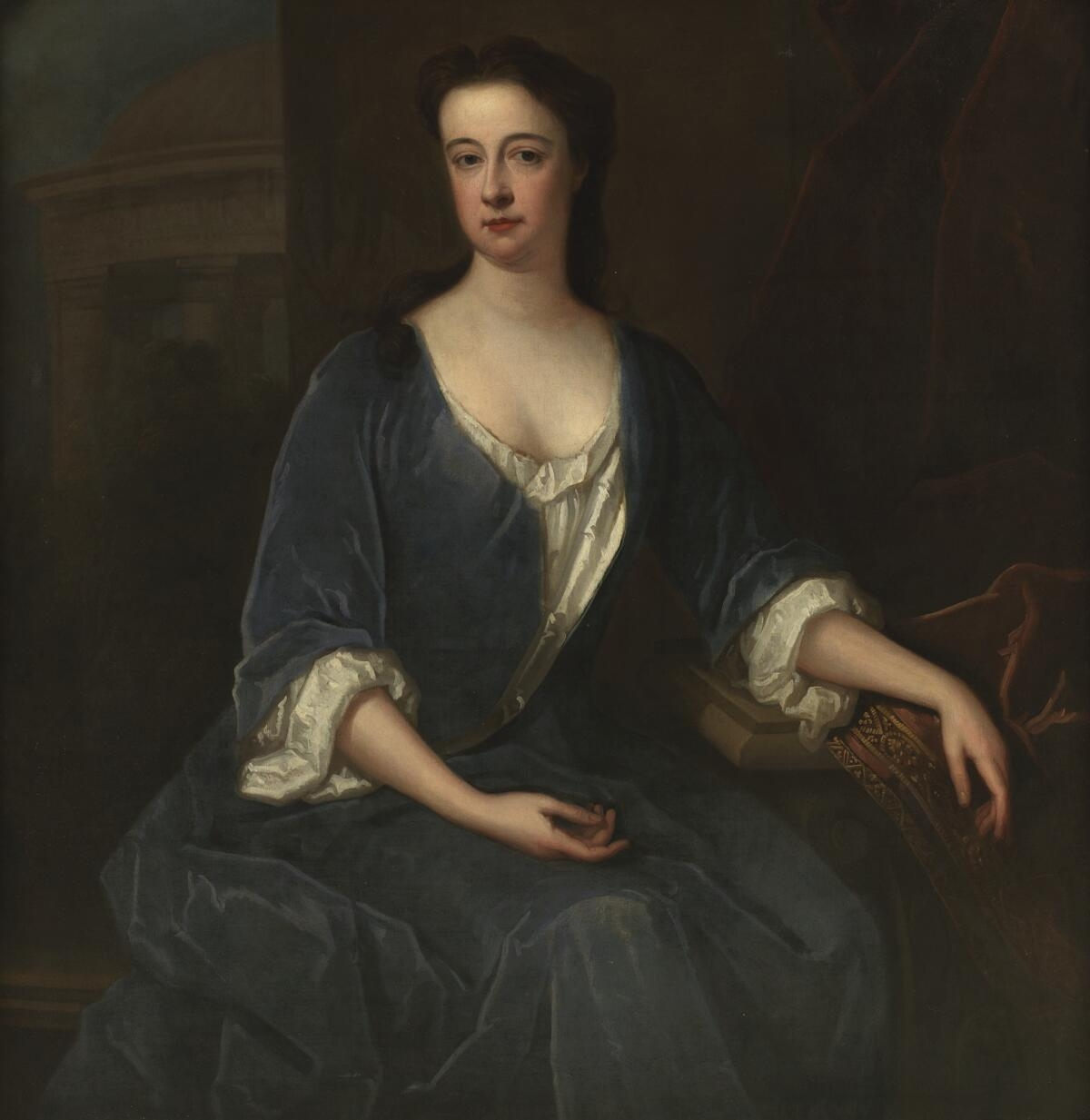
- Barbara, Countess of Pembroke
- Born: c. 1668
- Died: 1 August 1721 (aged 52–53)
- Spouses: Richard Mauleverer (d. 1689); John Arundell (d. 1698); Thomas Herbert
- Issue: 2, including Richard
- Father: Thomas Slingsby

Barbara Herbert, Countess of Pembroke (c.1668 – 1 August 1721) was a British court official and noble, the second wife of Thomas Herbert, 8th Earl of Pembroke. She became Lady of the Bedchamber for Princess Caroline of the Royal House of Hohenzollern.

== Biography ==
The daughter of Sir Thomas Slingsby, 2nd Baronet, and his wife, Dorothy Cradock. Barbara had two brothers: Sir Henry Slingsby, 3rd Baronet (c.1660-1691), and Sir Thomas Slingsby, 4th Baronet (c.1668-1726)

She was married three times in all. Her first marriage was to Sir Richard Mauleverer, 4th Baronet, of Allerton Mauleverer, who died in 1689. On 14 February 1692/93, she married her second husband, John Arundell, 2nd Baron Arundell of Trerice (1649–1698), of Trerice, Cornwall, who died in 1698. As Lady Arundell, she had a son, Hon. Richard Arundell (1698–1759), who became MP for Knaresborough, Clerk of the Pipe, Surveyor of the Works and Master of the Mint.

She married the Earl of Pembroke on 21 September 1708, in London. The earl and countess had one daughter, Lady Barbara Herbert (died 27 December 1752), who on 3 October 1730 married William Dudley North.

In 1718, the countess became a Lady of the Bedchamber to the Princess of Wales, Caroline of Ansbach, retaining the position until her own death three years later.
