= Milner baronets =

Title in the Baronetage of Great Britain

Escutcheon of the Milner baronets of Nun Appleton Hall

The Milner baronetcy, of Nun Appleton Hall in the County of York, is a title in the Baronetage of Great Britain. It was created on 26 February 1717 for William Milner, later Member of Parliament for York and Grand Master of the Freemasons. He was the son of William Milner (b. 1662), Mayor of Leeds, and his wife Mary, née Ibbetson.

The 2nd Baronet was Receiver-General of Excise and High Sheriff of Yorkshire. The 3rd and 5th Baronets both represented York in the House of Commons; while the 4th Baronet served as High Sheriff.

The 7th Baronet succeeded his brother who died young: he was Member of Parliament for York and Bassetlaw and joined the Privy Council in 1900. The 8th Baronet was an architect with Milner and Craze.

George Francis Milner, son of Henry Beilby William Milner, second son of the 4th Baronet, was a brigadier-general in the British Army. His son was the 9th Baronet. He relocated the family to South Africa, where the 10th Baronet now lives.

== Milner baronets, of Nun Appleton Hall (1717) ==
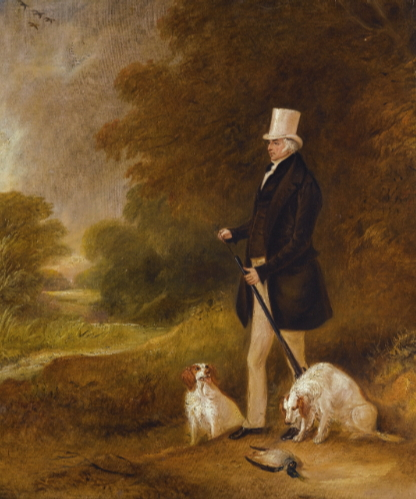
Sir William Mordaunt Sturt Milner, 4th Baronet

- Sir William Milner, 1st Baronet (c. 1696–1745)
- Sir William Milner, 2nd Baronet (c. 1725–1774)
- Sir William Mordaunt Milner, 3rd Baronet (1754–1811)
- Sir William Mordaunt Sturt Milner, 4th Baronet (1779–1855)
- Sir William Mordaunt Edward Milner, 5th Baronet (1820–1867)
- Sir William Mordaunt Milner, 6th Baronet (1848–1880)
- Sir Frederick George Milner, 7th Baronet (1849–1931)
- Sir William Frederick Victor Mordaunt Milner, 8th Baronet (1893–1960)
- Sir George Edward Mordaunt Milner, 9th Baronet (1911–1995)
- Sir Timothy William Lycett Milner, 10th Baronet (1936–2024)
- Sir Marcus Charles Mordaunt Milner, 11th Baronet (born 1968)

The heir apparent is the current holder's eldest son, Lucas Lane Mordaunt Milner (born 2002).

Baronetage of Great Britain
Preceded by Decker baronets	Milner baronets of Nun Appleton Hall; 26 February 1717	Succeeded by Elton baronets
