= Sir Henry Rich, 1st Baronet =

Sir Henry Rich, 1st Baronet (1803 – 5 November 1869) was a Liberal Party politician in the United Kingdom. He was Member of Parliament for Knaresborough in 1837 and for Richmond between 1846 & 1861 when he accepted the Chiltern Hundreds to make room for Sir Roundell Palmer. He was Lord of the Treasury from July 1846 to March 1852.

He was the illegitimate son of Admiral Sir Thomas Rich, 5th Baronet of Sonning (1733–1803), and Elizabeth Burt. Educated at the Royal Military College, Sandhurst, and Jesus College and Trinity College, Cambridge (B.A. in 1825), he served in the British Army and was at the taking of Poonah and the Battle of Kirkee for which he was awarded a medal. For some time he was a Groom in Waiting to her Majesty Queen Victoria.

On 7 September 1852 at the parish church of Acton, Cheshire, he married Julia, daughter of the late Rev. James Tomkinson of Dorfield Hall, Cheshire.

He was created a baronet in 1863.

His remains were interred in the Rich family vault at St Andrew's Church, Sonning, Berkshire on 10 November 1869.

Parliament of the United Kingdom
Preceded by John Richards and Andrew Lawson	Member of Parliament for Knaresborough; 1837–1841; With: Charles Langdale	Succeeded by Andrew Lawson and William Ferrand
Preceded by William Ridley-Colborne and John Charles Dundas	Member of Parliament for Richmond; 1846–1861; With: John Charles Dundas to 1847; Marmaduke Wyvill from 1847	Succeeded by Sir Roundell Palmer; Marmaduke Wyvill
Political offices
Preceded by Henry Bingham Baring; William Cripps; Swynfen Carnegie; Ralph Neville	Junior Lord of the Treasury; 1846–1852	Succeeded by Marquess of Chandos; The Lord Henry Lennox; Thomas Bateson
Baronetage of the United Kingdom
New creation	Baronet (of Sunning, Berkshire); 1863–1869	Extinct
