= Sir William Milner, 5th Baronet =

Sir William Milner Bt

Member of Parliament for City of York
- In office 24 May 1848 – 30 March 1857 Serving with John George Smyth
- Preceded by: John George Smyth; Henry Galgacus Redhead Yorke
- Succeeded by: John George Smyth; Joshua Westhead

Personal details
- Born: 20 June 1820 Bolton Percy, Yorkshire, England
- Died: 12 February 1867 (aged 46)
- Party: Whig
- Spouse: Georgiana Anne Lumley (m. 1844)
- Children: Seven, including William Mordaunt Milner and Frederick George Milner
- Parent(s): William Milner; Harriet Elizabeth Cavendish-Bentinck

Sir William Mordaunt Edward Milner, 5th Baronet (20 June 1820 – 12 February 1867) was a Whig politician.

Born and baptised in Bolton Percy, Yorkshire, Milner was the son of William Mordaunt Sturt Milner and Harriet Elizabeth née Cavendish-Bentinck, daughter of Lord Edward Bentinck and Elizabeth Cumberland. He married Lady Georgiana Anne Lumley—daughter of Frederick Lumley-Savile and Charlotte Mary Beresford—in 1844, and they had at least seven children: Edith Harriet (1845–1921); Evelyn Selina (c. 1847–1900); William Mordaunt (1848–1880); Frederick George (1849–1931); Granville Henry (1852–1911); Dudley Francis (1854–1882); and Edward Carolus (1858–1918).

Milner was first elected Whig MP for City of York at a by-election in 1848—caused by the death of Henry Galgacus Redhead Yorke—and held the seat until 1857, when he did not seek re-election.

Milner succeeded to the Baronetcy of Nun Appleton Hall on 24 March 1855 upon the death of William Mordaunt Sturt Milner. Upon his own death in 1867, the title was inherited by William Mordaunt Milner.

== Bird Collection ==
William Milner put together an important collection of stuffed British Birds, including a Great Auk. He also wrote a 'Nomenclature of British Birds'. The collection was loaned to the Leeds Philosophical and Literary Society in 1877 and purchased by the City of Leeds (now Leeds Museums and Galleries) in 1921. A large portion of it was destroyed on 15 March 1941 when a bomb landed on the City Museum, Park Row, Leeds.

Parliament of the United Kingdom
Preceded by Henry Redhead Yorke; John George Smyth	Member of Parliament for City of York; 1848–1857; With: John George Smyth	Succeeded by John George Smyth; Joshua Westhead
Baronetage of Great Britain
Preceded by William Mordaunt Sturt Milner	Baronet (of Nun Appleton Hall); 1855 – 1867	Succeeded by William Mordaunt Milner
