= William Ferrand =

British Conservative politician

Personal details
- Born: William Busfeild; 26 April 1809 Bingley, Yorkshire England
- Died: 31 March 1889 (aged 79) St. Ives, Bingley, England
- Resting place: Bingley
- Party: Conservatives
- Occupation: Politician

William Ferrand (formerly Busfeild; 26 April 1809 – 31 March 1889), also known as William Busfeild Ferrand, was a British Conservative politician. He served as Member of Parliament for Knaresborough and for Devonport.

== Early and personal life ==
Busfeild was born in Bingley in 1809 to Currer Fothergill Busfeild (1777–1832) and his wife, Sarah Ferrand. He attended Bingley Grammar School and briefly Giggleswick School. After Busfeild's mother inherited her brother's considerable property, in 1839 he took the additional surname of Ferrand by sign-manual in compliance with the requirements of his uncle's will. He dropped the name of Busfeild in 1854 after he succeeded to his mother's estate, which included Harden Grange and Bingley St Ives.

He married Sarah Priestley (died 1832) in 1831. They had a son, William before Sarah died giving birth to their daughter, Sarah Harriette.

== Political career ==
Busfeild entered public life in 1833 and unsuccessfully stood as a candidate for Bradford in the 1837 general election. He remained active, opposing the Anti-Corn Law League, and was elected in 1841 to represent Knaresborough. He attacked the league and poor-law administration in parliament, and became associated with the Young England group. Lord Harewood withdrew his support for the 1847 election and he was unable to find another seat.

His second marriage in 1847 lead to him resuming his political career in 1850, and he unsuccessfully contested the Aylesbury by-election in 1851. He then contested Devonport in the 1859 election and two further by-elections that year, before succeeding in the 1863 by-election. During his second period in parliament, he played a part in forcing the resignation of Lord Westbury, the Lord Chancellor. He was re-elected for Devonport in 1865, but the election was later declared void after he was found guilty of bribery.

He unsuccessfully stood in by-elections for Coventry in 1867 and Devonport in 1868.

Ferrand died in St. Ives in 1889.

== Footnotes ==
Parliament of the United Kingdom
Preceded by Henry Rich; Charles Langdale	Member of Parliament for Knaresborough; 1841–1847	Succeeded by William Lascelles; Joshua Westhead
Preceded by Michael Seymour; Arthur William Buller	Member of Parliament for Devonport; 1863–1865	Succeeded by Thomas Brassey; John Fleming
