= Joshua Westhead =

British politician

Joshua Proctor Brown Westhead (April 15, 1807–July 8, 1877) was a British politician. He was elected as a Liberal MP for Knaresborough from 1847 to 1852.

== Political career ==
Westhead returned to the Commons as MP for City of York from 1857 to 1865, and again from 1868 until he resigned in 1871 by becoming Steward of the Manor of Northstead.

== Marriage and Children ==
In 1828 he married Betsy Chapell (1807-1888), daughter of George Royle Chapell of Nelson house. together they had four children.

- George Edward Westhead (July 19, 1829-February 8

, 1872)

- Adelaide Westhead ( November 1, 1830-January 21, 1885). Married the 29th Baron of Kingsale.
- Marcus Westhead (February 7, 1834-1897)
- Thomas Westhead (April 7, 1837-July 12, 1861)

Parliament of the United Kingdom
| Preceded by William Busfeild Ferrand; Andrew Lawson | Member of Parliament for Knaresborough; 1847 – 1852; With: William Lascelles to 1851; Thomas Collins 1851–52 | Succeeded by John Dent Dent; Basil Thomas Woodd |
| Preceded by William Milner; John George Smyth | Member of Parliament for City of York; 1857 – 1865; With: John George Smyth | Succeeded by George Leeman; James Lowther |
| Preceded by George Leeman; James Lowther | Member of Parliament for City of York; 1868 – 1871; With: James Lowther | Succeeded by James Lowther; George Leeman |
