= Charles Langdale =

British politician and biographer

The Honourable Charles Langdale
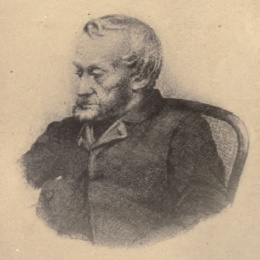
- Langdale depicted in Salvage from the Wreck

Personal details
- Born: Charles Stourton; 19 September 1787
- Died: 1 December 1868 (aged 81) Mayfair, London, England
- Resting place: Houghton, Yorkshire, England
- Party: Whig
- Occupation: Politician, biographer

Charles Langdale (formerly Stourton); (19 September 1787 – 1 December 1868) was a British politician and biographer. He served as Whig Member of Parliament, wrote the memoirs of Maria Fitzherbert, and was a leading Roman Catholic figure during the 19th century.

== Origins ==
Langdale was born Hon. Charles Stourton in 1787, the fourth son of Charles Stourton, 17th Baron Stourton by his wife Mary Langdale, a daughter and co-heiress of Marmaduke Langdale, 5th Baron Langdale (1771–1777). He became the heir of his mother's cousin Philip Langdale (d.1815) of Houghton Hall, East Riding of Yorkshire, who died with no sons, and to comply with the terms of his inheritance he adopted the surname Langdale by royal licence dated 1815, for himself and his descendants.

== Education ==
He was educated at Oscott College and Stonyhurst College.

== Politics and public life ==
Langdale campaigned for Catholic Emancipation, and after the passing of the Roman Catholic Relief Act 1829 he became Member of Parliament for Beverley following the 1832 general election, becoming one of the first Catholics in the House of Commons. He represented Beverley until 1835, and represented Knaresborough between 1837 and 1841.

Throughout his life, Langdale took a leading part in all matters relating to the interests of Roman Catholics. He supported the foundation and became the chairman of the Catholic Poor School Committee, serving until his death. During his tenure, he played an important role in the negotiations for public funds for Roman Catholic schools.

Shortly before his death, he was admitted as a lay brother of the Society of Jesus. At his funeral, Peter Gallwey described him as "the acknowledged father and patriarch of the oppressed Catholic community in England" and as "a father to us all". Henry Edward Manning, Archbishop of Westminster, in a funeral sermon in London, described him as having been for fifty years the foremost man among the Roman Catholic laity in England.

== Biography of Maria Fitzherbert ==
Langdale had been a close friend of Maria Fitzherbert during their youth; there was a family connection through her first husband George Weld, whose niece married his eldest brother William. In the publication Memoirs of Lord Holland, it was claimed that Fitzherbert, a Roman Catholic, never believed her marriage vows to George, Prince of Wales, to be in any way binding (the marriage was considered invalid under the Royal Marriages Act 1772 because it had not been approved by King George III and the Privy Council). With a view to the vindication of her character, he published Memoirs of Mrs. Fitzherbert: with an account of her marriage with H.R.H. the Prince of Wales, afterwards King George IV at the request of his brother, Lord Stourton, one of the trustees named in Fitzherbert's will. He was refused access to her papers by the other trustees, but he was able to use the narrative drawn up by Lord Stourton. The memoirs showed that Fitzherbert believed herself to be George's wife.

== Marriage and children ==
He married twice:

- Firstly in 1817 to Charlotte Mary Clifford (died 1819), fifth daughter of Charles Clifford, 6th Baron Clifford of Chudleigh, by whom he had two daughters.
- Secondly in 1821 he married May Constable-Maxwell (died 1857), eldest daughter of Marmaduke William Haggerstone Constable-Maxwell, by whom he had at least five sons and six daughters.

== Death and succession ==
He died in Mayfair, London, in 1868 and was buried near his seat, Houghton Hall, Yorkshire. He was succeeded by his eldest son, Charles Joseph Langdale (1822-1895).

== Bibliography ==
- Langdale, Charles (1856). Memoirs of Mrs. Fitzherbert: with an account of her marriage with H.R.H. the Prince of Wales, afterwards King George IV. London: Richard Bentley. OCLC 1044173.

== Footnotes ==
Parliament of the United Kingdom
Preceded by Henry Burton; William Marshall	Member of Parliament for Beverley; 1832–1835; With: Henry Burton	Succeeded by Henry Burton; James Hogg
Preceded by John Richards; Andrew Lawson	Member of Parliament for Knaresborough; 1837–1841; With: Henry Rich	Succeeded by Andrew Lawson; William Ferrand
