= Benjamin Rotch =

British barrister, politician, and author

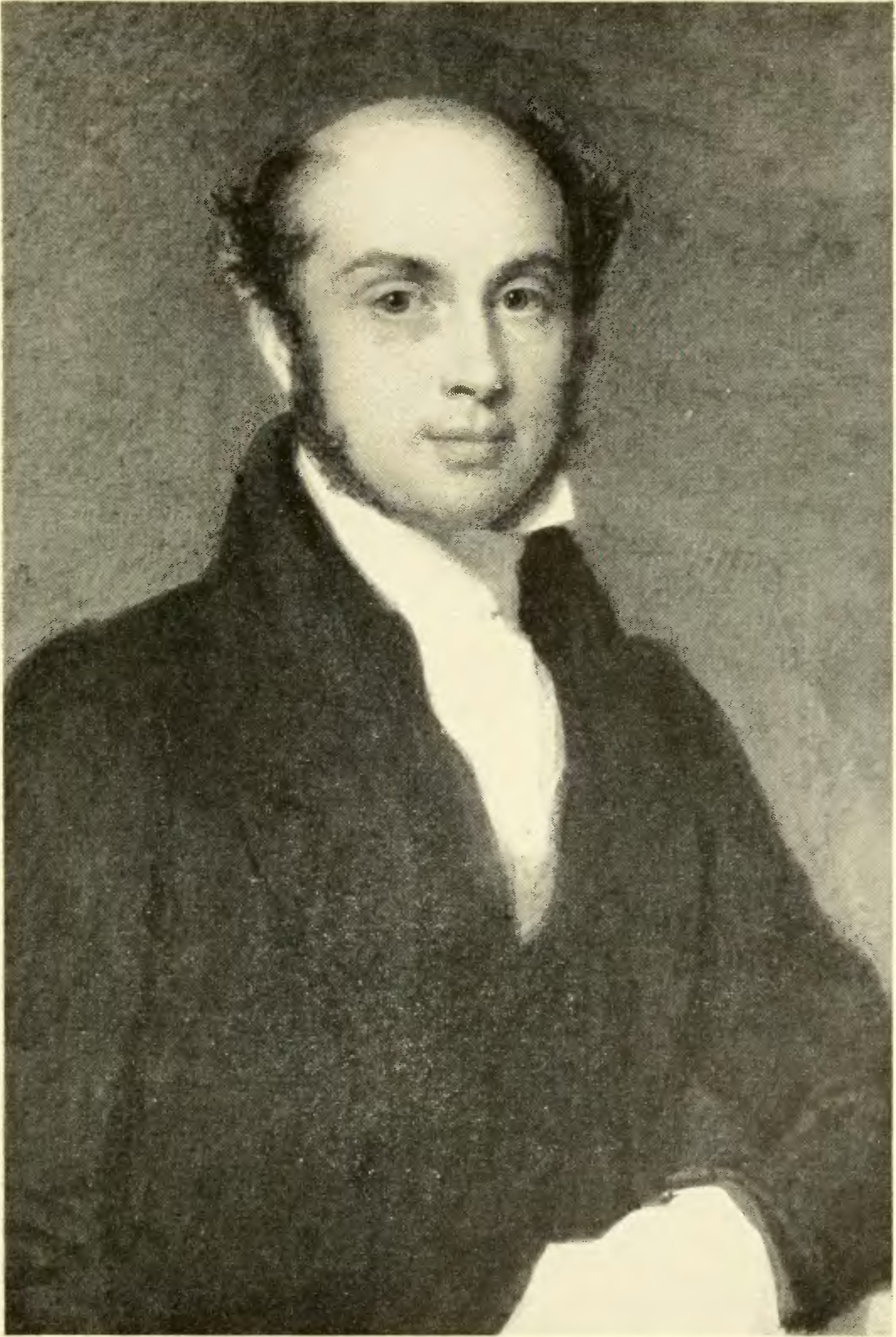
- Born: 29 November 1793
- Died: 31 October 1854 (aged 60)
- Resting place: Kensal Green Cemetery
- Occupation: Politician, lawyer
- Parent(s): Benjamin Rotch
- Position held: member of the 11th Parliament of the United Kingdom (1832–1834)

Benjamin Rotch (29 November 1794 – 31 October 1854), was a British barrister, politician and author.

Rotch was MP for Knaresborough from 1832 to 1835. He was elected after the 1832 Reform Act, which sought to reform the electoral system in England and Wales and to expand the franchise to include a wider segment of the male population, including small landowners, tenant farmers, shopkeepers, and all malemhouseholders who paid a yearly rental of at least £10.

He is buried at Kensal Green Cemetery, London.
