= Thomas Collins (British politician) =

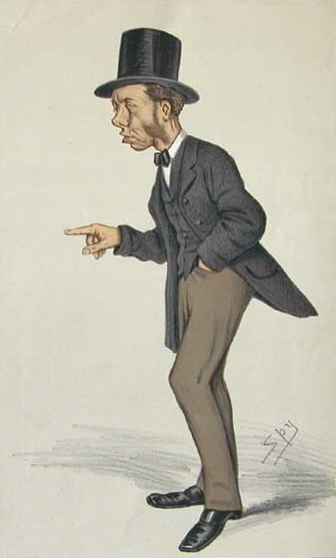
"Noisy Tom" Collins as caricatured by Spy (Leslie Ward) in Vanity Fair, September 1873

Thomas Collins (1825 – 26 November 1884) was a Conservative Party politician in England.

He was elected as Member of Parliament (MP) for Knaresborough at a by-election in 1851 following the death of William Lascelles, but was defeated at the 1852 general election. He regained the seat at the 1857 general election and held it in 1859, but was defeated again at the 1865 general election.

Collins was returned to the House of Commons at the 1868 general election for Boston, but lost that seat at the 1874 general election.

He stood unsuccessfully in Derby at the 1880 general election, but won a by-election in Knaresborough in 1881, and held that seat until his death in 1884.

Parliament of the United Kingdom
Preceded by William Lascelles and Joshua Westhead	Member of Parliament for Knaresborough; 1851–1852; With: Joshua Westhead	Succeeded by Basil Woodd and John Dent
Preceded by Basil Woodd and John Dent	Member of Parliament for Knaresborough; 1857–1865; With: Basil Woodd	Succeeded by Basil Woodd and Isaac Holden
Preceded by Thomas Parry and John Malcolm	Member of Parliament for Boston; 1868–1874; With: John Malcolm	Succeeded by Thomas Parry and William Ingram
Preceded by Sir Henry Meysey-Thompson	Member of Parliament for Knaresborough; 1881–1884	Succeeded by Robert Gunter
