= Knaresborough (constituency) =

Parliamentary constituency in the United Kingdom, 1868–1885

- Former borough constituency for the House of Commons

1553–1885
- Seats: two until 1868, then one
- Replaced by: Ripon

Knaresborough was a parliamentary constituency which returned two Members of Parliament (MPs) to the Parliament of England, Parliament of Great Britain and the House of Commons of the Parliament of the United Kingdom until 1868, and then one MP until its abolition in 1885.

== History ==
=== Before the Reform Act 1832 ===
Knaresborough was a parliamentary borough, first enfranchised by Mary I in 1553. The borough consisted of part of the town of Knaresborough, a market town in the West Riding of Yorkshire. In 1831, the population of the borough was approximately 4,852, and contained 970 houses.

Knaresborough was a burgage borough, meaning that the right to vote was confined to the proprietors of certain specific properties (or "burgage tenements") in the borough; in Knaresborough there was no requirement for these proprietors to be resident, and normally the majority were not. This meant that the right to vote in Knaresborough could be legitimately bought and sold, and, for most of its history until the Reform Act 1832 reformed the franchise, the majority of the burgages were concentrated in the hands of a single owner who could therefore nominate both MPs without opposition. Nevertheless, contested elections were possible, and in 1830, when there were theoretically about 90 qualified voters, 45 people actually voted. But the landowners had other resources beyond the votes they owned, as the bailiff of the lord of the manor was also the returning officer, and of the 45 who attempted to vote in 1830 the bailiff rejected the votes of 23.

In the 16th and 17th century, the main landowners in the area were the Slingsby family, who on occasion occupied both seats themselves, though usually they found it more advantageous to allow one of their fellow county magnates to have at least one of the seats. During the latter part of the Elizabethan period, the Duchy of Lancaster also seems to have been influential – the historian Sir John Neale considered that the Duchy probably nominated at least one of the two members in each parliament from 1584 to 1597 – but the influence of the Slingsbys was consolidated later. By the mid-18th century, ownership had passed to the Dukes of Devonshire, who retained it until the Reform Act.

=== After the Great Reform Act ===
The Reform Act extended Knaresborough's boundaries, bringing in the remainder of the town and coinciding with the boundaries established during the previous decade for policing purposes. This increased the population by nearly a third, to 6,253. Nevertheless, Knaresborough was one of the smaller boroughs to retain both its seats, and the registered electorate for the first reformed election was only 278. In subsequent years this fell further, though by the 1860s it had recovered to reach around 270 once more, and inevitably Knaresborough's representation was reduced to one MP under the Representation of the People Act 1867. The extension of the franchise by the same Act trebled the electorate.

In 1880, after a disputed election with suspicion of corrupt practices, the result was declared void and the constituency's right to representation suspended while a Royal Commission investigated; however, unlike the investigations in some other constituencies at around the same period, nothing too damning was uncovered, and a by-election to fill the vacancies was held in 1881. It proved, nevertheless, to be Knaresborough's last Parliament, for its electorate was still too low and the borough was abolished by the Redistribution of Seats Act 1885. Its electors were transferred to the new Ripon division of the West Riding, a county constituency.

== Members of Parliament ==
=== 1553–1640 ===
Parliament	First member	Second member
1553 (Oct)	Reginald Beseley	Ralph Scrope
1554 (Apr)	Edward Napper	John Long
1554 (Nov)	Sir Thomas Chaloner	Ralph Scrope
1555	Henry Fisher	?Sir Thomas Chaloner or George Eden
1558	Henry Darcy	Thomas Colshill
1558/9	Laurence Nowell	William Byrnand
1562/3	William Strickland, sat for Scarborough repl. by Christopher Tamworth	Sir Henry Gate, sat for Scarborough repl. by Robert Bowes
1571	Sir George Bowes	John Cade
1572 (Apr)	Francis Slingsby	Richard Banks
1584	Edmund Poley	Francis Slingsby
1586	Francis Palmes	William Davison
1588/9	Thomas Preston	Francis Harvey
1593	Samuel Foxe	Simon Willis
1597 (Sep)	Hugh Beeston	William Slingsby
1601 (Oct)	Henry Slingsby	William Slingsby
1604–1611	Sir Henry Slingsby	Sir William Slingsby
1614	Sir Henry Slingsby	William Beecher
1620–1622	Sir Henry Slingsby	Sir Richard Hutton
1624	Sir Henry Slingsby	Sir Richard Hutton
1625	Sir Henry Slingsby	Sir Richard Hutton
1626	Sir Richard Hutton	Henry Benson
1628	Sir Richard Hutton	Henry Benson
1629–1640	No Parliaments convened	

=== 1640–1868 ===
Year	1st Member	1st Party	2nd Member	2nd Party		
April 1640	Sir Henry Slingsby	Royalist	?			
November 1640	Sir Henry Slingsby	Royalist	Henry Benson (Note: Expelled, November 1641)	Royalist		
1641	Sir Henry Slingsby	Royalist	William Deerlove (Note: Deerlove was returned in a disputed election; the House decided in favour of his opponent, Constable, in March 1642)			
March 1642	Sir Henry Slingsby	Royalist	Sir William Constable, Bt.	Parliamentarian		
September 1642	Slingsby disabled from sitting – seat vacant		Sir William Constable, Bt.	Parliamentarian		
1645	Thomas Stockdale		Sir William Constable, Bt.	Parliamentarian		
1653	Knaresborough was unrepresented in the Barebones Parliament and the First and Second Parliaments of the Protectorate					
January 1659	Slingsby Bethel		Robert Walters			
May 1659	Not represented in the restored Rump (Constable had died in the interim)					
April 1660	William Stockdale		Henry Bethell			
1661	William Stockdale		Sir John Talbot			
1679	William Stockdale		Sir Thomas Slingsby, Bt			
1685	William Stockdale		Henry Slingsby			
1689	William Stockdale		Thomas Fawkes			
1693	Christopher Stockdale		Thomas Fawkes			
1695	Christopher Stockdale		Robert Byerley			
Mar 1714	Francis Fawkes		Robert Byerley			
May 1714	Francis Fawkes		Henry Slingsby			
1715	Henry Coote (Note: Succeeded as The Earl of Mountrath (in the Peerage of Ireland), September 1715)	Whig	Robert Hitch			
1720	Hon. Richard Arundell		Robert Hitch			
1722	Hon. Richard Arundell		Sir Henry Slingsby, Bt			
1758	Hon Robert Walsingham		Sir Henry Slingsby, Bt			
1761	Lord John Cavendish	Rockingham Whig	Sir Henry Slingsby, Bt			
1763	Lord John Cavendish	Rockingham Whig	Sir Anthony Abdy, Bt	Rockingham Whig		
1768	Captain The Hon Robert Walsingham, RN		Sir Anthony Abdy, Bt	Rockingham Whig		
1775	Captain The Hon Robert Walsingham, RN		Lord George Cavendish			
1780	Captain The Hon Robert Walsingham, RN		Frederick Ponsonby	Whig		
1781	James Hare	Whig	Frederick Ponsonby	Whig		
1793	James Hare	Whig	Lord John Townshend	Whig		
1804	William Cavendish	Whig	Lord John Townshend	Whig		
1805	John Ponsonby (Note: A by-election to replace Cavendish was held in 1804 but abandoned due to rioting, and no return was made. At the by-election held in March 1805, Duncannon received 67 votes and T.E. Wynn Belayse (the Tory candidate) received 125, but Belayse's votes came from the residents whereas Duncannon's came from the (mostly non-resident) proprietors of the burgage tenancies, and Duncannon was returned as Member)	Whig	Lord John Townshend	Whig		
1806	Charles Bennet	Whig	Lord John Townshend	Whig		
1818	Sir James Mackintosh	Whig	George Tierney	Whig		
Feb 1830	Sir James Mackintosh	Whig	Henry Brougham (Note: Brougham was re-elected at the general election in 1830 but was also returned for Yorkshire; he was elevated to the House of Lords before having chosen which constituency he would represent in the Commons)	Whig		
Dec 1830	Sir James Mackintosh	Whig	Henry Cavendish	Whig		
Jun 1832	William Ponsonby	Whig	Henry Cavendish	Whig		
Dec 1832	John Richards	Whig	Benjamin Rotch	Whig		
1835	John Richards	Whig	Andrew Lawson	Conservative		
1837	Henry Rich	Whig	Hon Charles Langdale	Whig		
1841	Andrew Lawson	Conservative	William Ferrand	Conservative		
1847	William Lascelles	Peelite	Joshua Westhead	Whig		
1851	Thomas Collins	Conservative	Joshua Westhead	Whig		
1852 (Note: Woodd, Dent and Westhead each received 113 votes, resulting in a triple election. However, after scrutiny, one vote was taken from Westhead and he was declared unduly elected in 1853)	Basil Thomas Woodd	Conservative	Joshua Westhead	Whig	John Dent	Whig
1853	Basil Thomas Woodd	Conservative	John Dent	Whig		
1857	Basil Thomas Woodd	Conservative	Thomas Collins	Conservative		
1865	Basil Thomas Woodd	Conservative	Isaac Holden	Liberal		

=== 1868–1885 ===
Election	Member	Party
1868	Alfred Illingworth	Liberal
1874	Basil Thomas Woodd	Conservative
1880	Sir Henry Meysey-Thompson, Bt.	Liberal
1881	Thomas Collins	Conservative
1884	Robert Gunter	Conservative
1885	constituency abolished	

== Election results ==
=== Elections in the 1830s ===
Tierney's death caused a by-election.

By-election, 16 February 1830: Knaresborough
Party	Candidate	Votes	%
Whig	Henry Brougham	Unopposed	
Whig hold			

General election 1830: Knaresborough
Party	Candidate	Votes	%
Whig	James Mackintosh	Unopposed	
Whig	Henry Brougham	Unopposed	
Registered electors		c. 88	
Whig hold			
Whig hold			

Mackintosh was appointed a commissioner of the India Board, requiring a by-election.

By-election, 2 December 1830: Knaresborough
Party	Candidate	Votes	%
Whig	James Mackintosh	Unopposed	
Registered electors		c. 88	
Whig hold			

Brougham was called to the House of Lords' Lords Temporal, causing a by-election.

By-election, 2 December 1830: Knaresborough
Party	Candidate	Votes	%
Whig	Henry Cavendish	20	44.4
Tory	John Entwistle	25	55.6
Majority		−5.0	−11.2
Turnout		45	c. 51.1
Registered electors		c. 88	
Whig hold			

- The majority (23) of Entwisle's votes were challenged and the returning officer upheld the complaints. A similar challenge was laid against Cavendish, but parliament was dissolved the following day.

General election 1831: Knaresborough
Party	Candidate	Votes	%
Whig	James Mackintosh	Unopposed	
Whig	Henry Cavendish	Unopposed	
Registered electors		c. 88	
Whig hold			
Whig hold			

Mackintosh's death caused a by-election.

By-election, 28 June 1832: Knaresborough
Party	Candidate	Votes	%
Whig	William Ponsonby	Unopposed	
Registered electors		c. 88	
Whig hold			

General election 1832: Knaresborough
Party	Candidate	Votes	%
Whig	John Richards	187	39.4
Whig	Benjamin Rotch	116	24.4
Whig	Henry Rich	96	20.2
Tory	Andrew Lawson	76	16.0
Majority		20	4.2
Turnout		260	93.5
Registered electors		278	
Whig hold			
Whig hold			

General election 1835: Knaresborough
Party	Candidate	Votes	%	±%
Conservative	Andrew Lawson	179	40.3	+24.3
Whig	John Richards	134	30.2	−9.2
Whig	Henry Rich	111	25.0	+4.8
Conservative	Gregory Allnutt Lewin	20	4.5	N/A
Turnout		239	90.5	−3.0
Registered electors		264		
Majority		68	15.3	N/A
Conservative gain from Whig		Swing	+13.3	
Majority		114	25.7	+21.5
Whig hold		Swing	−10.7	

General election 1837: Knaresborough
Party	Candidate	Votes	%	±%
Whig	Henry Rich	172	41.5	+16.5
Whig	Charles Langdale	124	30.0	−0.2
Conservative	Andrew Lawson	118	28.5	−16.3
Majority		6	1.5	N/A
Turnout		236	87.1	−3.4
Registered electors		271		
Whig hold		Swing	+12.3	
Whig gain from Conservative		Swing	+4.0	

=== Elections in the 1840s ===
General election 1841: Knaresborough
Party	Candidate	Votes	%	±%
Conservative	Andrew Lawson	150	42.0	+27.8
Conservative	William Ferrand	122	34.2	+20.0
Whig	Charles Sturgeon	85	23.8	−47.7
Majority		37	10.4	N/A
Turnout		208	86.3	−0.8
Registered electors		241		
Conservative gain from Whig		Swing	+25.8	
Conservative gain from Whig		Swing	+21.9	

General election 1847: Knaresborough
Party	Candidate	Votes	%	±%
Peelite	William Lascelles	158	39.5	+5.3
Whig	Joshua Westhead	128	32.0	+8.2
Conservative	Andrew Lawson	114	28.5	−13.5
Turnout		200 (est)	82.6 (est)	−3.7
Registered electors		242		
Majority		44	11.0	N/A
Peelite gain from Conservative		Swing	+6.0	
Majority		14	3.5	N/A
Whig gain from Conservative		Swing	+7.5	

=== Elections in the 1850s ===
Lascelle's death caused a by-election.

By-election, 12 July 1851: Knaresborough
Party	Candidate	Votes	%	±%
Conservative	Thomas Collins	95	59.7	N/A
Conservative	Andrew Lawson	64	40.3	+11.8
Majority		31	19.4	N/A
Turnout		159	73.3	−9.3
Registered electors		217		
Conservative gain from Peelite		Swing	N/A	

General election 1852: Knaresborough
Party	Candidate	Votes	%	±%
Conservative	Basil Thomas Woodd	113	25.3	−14.2
Whig	John Dent	113	25.3	+9.3
Whig	Joshua Westhead	113	25.3	+9.3
Conservative	Thomas Collins	107	24.0	−4.5
Majority		6	1.3	N/A
Turnout		223 (est)	92.1 (est)	+9.5
Registered electors		242		
Conservative gain from Peelite		Swing	−11.8	
Whig hold		Swing	+9.3	
Whig win				

As Woodd, Dent and Westhead received the same number of votes, they were all elected. However, in April 1853, after scrutiny, one vote was taken from Westhead and he was declared unduly elected.

General election 1857: Knaresborough
Party	Candidate	Votes	%	±%
Conservative	Basil Thomas Woodd	174	42.2	+16.9
Conservative	Thomas Collins	138	33.5	+9.5
Whig	Robert Campbell	100	24.3	−26.3
Majority		38	9.2	+7.9
Turnout		206 (est)	76.3 (est)	−15.8
Registered electors		270		
Conservative hold		Swing	+15.0	
Conservative gain from Whig		Swing	+11.3	

General election 1859: Knaresborough
Party	Candidate	Votes	%	±%
Conservative	Basil Thomas Woodd	173	39.3	−2.9
Conservative	Thomas Collins	140	31.8	−1.7
Liberal	Harry Thompson	127	28.9	+4.6
Majority		13	2.9	−6.3
Turnout		220 (est)	76.9 (est)	+0.6
Registered electors		286		
Conservative hold		Swing	−2.6	
Conservative hold		Swing	−2.0	

=== Elections in the 1860s ===
General election 1865: Knaresborough
Party	Candidate	Votes	%	±%
Conservative	Basil Thomas Woodd	156	38.4	−0.9
Liberal	Isaac Holden	127	31.3	+2.4
Conservative	Thomas Collins	123	30.3	−1.5
Turnout		267 (est)	98.0 (est)	+21.1
Registered electors		272		
Majority		29	7.1	+4.2
Conservative hold		Swing	−1.1	
Majority		4	1.0	N/A
Liberal gain from Conservative		Swing	+2.4	

Seat reduced to one member

General election 1868: Knaresborough
Party	Candidate	Votes	%	±%
Liberal	Alfred Illingworth	362	51.1	+19.8
Conservative	Andrew Sherlock Lawson	347	48.9	−19.8
Majority		15	2.2	+1.2
Turnout		709	92.2	−5.8
Registered electors		769		
Liberal hold		Swing	+19.8	

=== Elections in the 1870s ===
General election 1874: Knaresborough
Party	Candidate	Votes	%	±%
Conservative	Basil Thomas Woodd	397	56.2	+7.3
Liberal	Andrew Fairbairn	309	43.8	−7.3
Majority		88	12.4	N/A
Turnout		706	91.7	−0.5
Registered electors		770		
Conservative gain from Liberal		Swing	+7.3	

=== Elections in the 1880s ===
General election 1880: Knaresborough
Party	Candidate	Votes	%	±%
Liberal	Henry Meysey-Thompson	357	51.1	+7.3
Conservative	Basil Thomas Woodd	341	48.9	−7.3
Majority		16	2.2	N/A
Turnout		698	91.6	−0.1
Registered electors		762		
Liberal gain from Conservative		Swing	+7.3	

The election was declared void on petition, causing a by-election.

By-election, 13 May 1881: Knaresborough
Party	Candidate	Votes	%	±%
Conservative	Thomas Collins	374	52.9	+4.0
Liberal	Charles Milnes Gaskell	333	47.1	−4.0
Majority		41	5.8	N/A
Turnout		707	93.3	+1.7
Registered electors		758		
Conservative gain from Liberal		Swing	+4.0	

Collins' death caused a by-election.

By-election, 10 Dec 1884: Knaresborough
Party	Candidate	Votes	%	±%
Conservative	Robert Gunter	319	54.4	+5.5
Liberal	Angus Holden	267	45.6	−5.5
Majority		52	8.8	N/A
Turnout		586	90.0	−1.6
Registered electors		651		
Conservative gain from Liberal		Swing	+5.5	
