= John Talbot of Lacock =

English politician, soldier, and landowner

Sir John Talbot
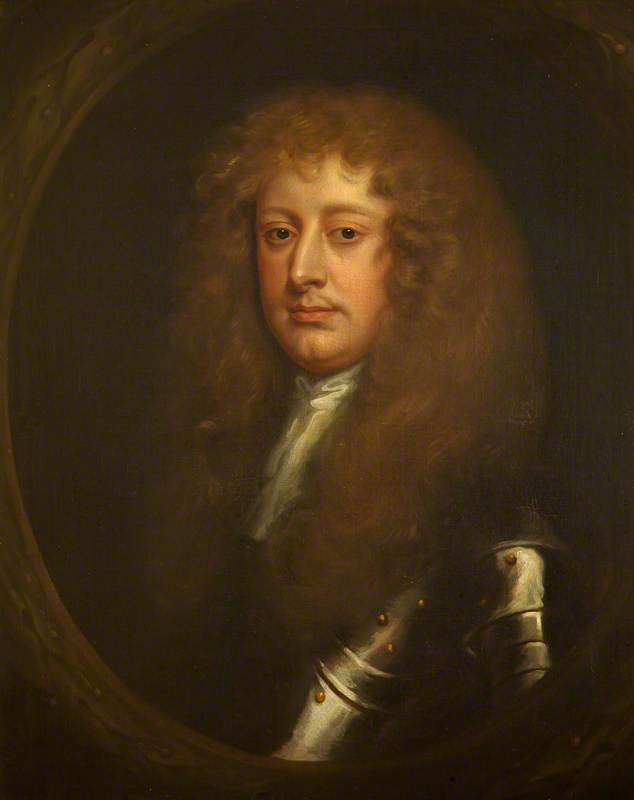
- Sir John Talbot, MP

MP for Devizes
- In office 1685–1685
- Monarch: James II

MP for Chippenham
- In office March 1679 – July 1679
- Monarch: Charles II

MP for Knaresborough
- In office 1661–1678

MP for Worcestershire
- In office April 1660 – December 1660

Personal details
- Born: 7 June 1630 Lacock Abbey, Wiltshire
- Died: 13 March 1714 (aged 83) Lacock Abbey, Wiltshire
- Parent(s): Colonel Sharington Talbot, (1599–1677); Jane Lyttelton
- Occupation: Politician, landowner, soldier

Military service
- Allegiance: England
- Branch/service: Dragoons
- Years of service: 1661 to 1688
- Rank: Colonel
- Unit: 6th Dragoon Guards

Sir John Talbot (7 June 1630 – 13 March 1714) was an English politician, soldier, and landowner, who was Member of Parliament for various seats between 1660 and 1685. He held rank in a number of regiments, although he does not appear to have seen active service.

He took part in several duels, as both principal and second, including one in 1667 between George Villiers, 2nd Duke of Buckingham and his relative, Francis Talbot, 11th Earl of Shrewsbury, which ended in the latter's death.

Like most of his family, he was a Stuart loyalist, and lost his positions following the November 1688 Glorious Revolution. He refused to swear allegiance to the new regime of Mary II and William III, but did not take part in any Jacobite plots.

He died in March 1714; his property was left to his grandson, John Ivory-Talbot (1691–1772).

== Biography ==
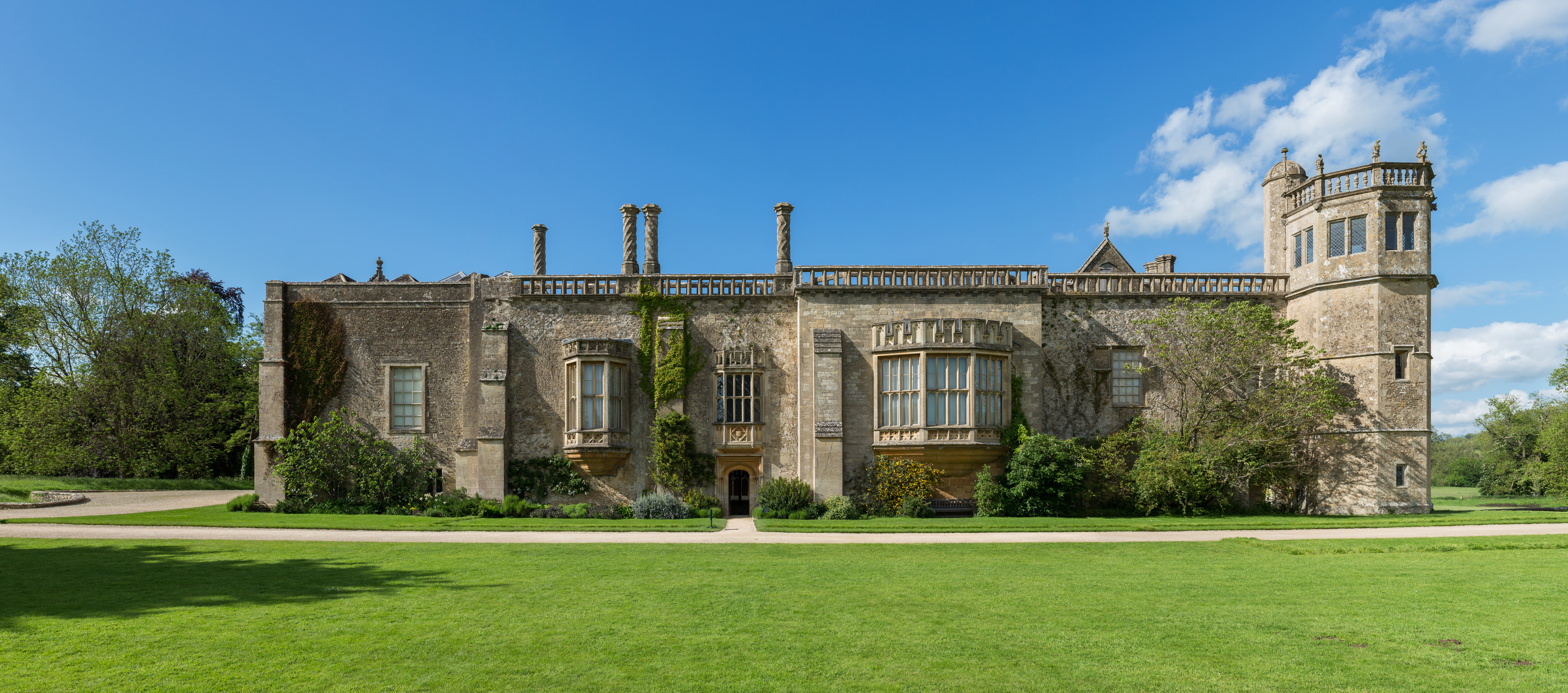
Lacock Abbey from the south

John Talbot was born on 7 June 1630, the eldest surviving son of Colonel Sharington Talbot (1599–1677), and Jane Lyttelton. He had a sister, Elizabeth (died 1709).

Related to the Earls of Shrewsbury, the Talbots' main estates were in Salwarpe, Worcestershire. They acquired Lacock Abbey, Wiltshire through his great-grandmother, Olive, who died at the age of 97 in 1646. Like John himself, both his uncle Sir Gilbert and father lived into their 80s, as did many other close relatives.

In 1653, he married Elizabeth Keyt, who died in childbirth in 1656, and was buried with her infant son in Stow-on-the-Wold. He married again in 1660, this time to Barbara Slingsby (1633 –1703), daughter of Sir Henry Slingsby, executed in 1658 for plotting against the Protectorate. They had three daughters who lived to adulthood; Anne (1665–1720), Barbara (1671–1763), and Gilberta (1675–1746). His estates were inherited by his grandson John Ivory-Talbot (1691–1772), son of Anne and her husband Sir John Ivory.

== Career ==
In the First English Civil War, his father played a prominent role in raising Wiltshire for Charles I, and garrisoned Lacock Abbey until its capture in September 1645. He was imprisoned for a year, and eventually released after paying a fine of £2,000; John's uncle, Sir Gilbert, was arrested in 1650 on suspicion of conspiring to restore Charles II, and went into exile.

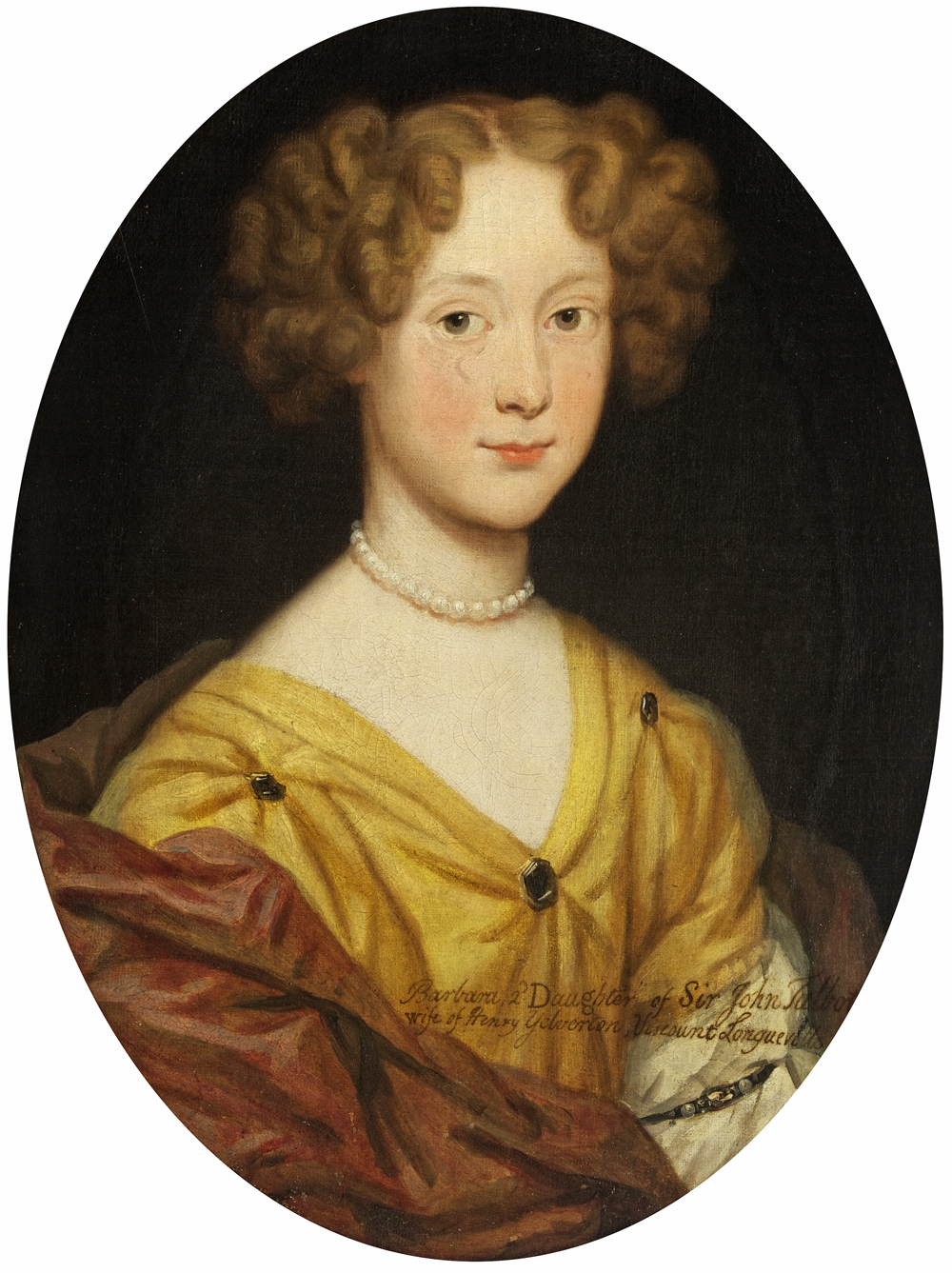
Talbot's second daughter, Barbara (1671–1763)

In August 1659, Talbot was briefly arrested for alleged complicity in Booth's Rising, a Royalist rebellion easily crushed by John Lambert. In the lead up to the 1660 Restoration, he was elected for Worcestershire in the Convention Parliament, and knighted by Charles II at Whitehall on 6 June 1660. He was made captain in a company of the Foot Guards in February 1661.

In April, he was elected to the Cavalier Parliament as MP for Knaresborough, a constituency controlled by the Slingsby family. He played an active role in co-ordinating votes in Parliament, and like his uncle, was closely associated with the Duke of Ormond.

English politics was riven by factionalism, which combined with a passion for duelling often resulted in violence. Talbot took part in two famous duels involving his relatives, the first in 1666 between Thomas Belasyse (Note: Barbara Belasyse (1609/1610 to 1641), was his wife's mother) and Thomas Osborne, later Lord Danby, then a supporter of the Duke of Buckingham. In January 1668, he acted for Francis Talbot, 11th Earl of Shrewsbury in a duel with Buckingham, in which the Earl was fatally wounded. At the time, it was common for seconds to participate; Talbot was also injured, one of Buckingham's supporters killed.

When the Third Anglo-Dutch War began in March 1672, Talbot was appointed lieutenant-colonel of the Barbados Dragoons, which was disbanded after the Treaty of Westminster in February 1674. England re-entered the Franco-Dutch War in March 1678 after signing a defensive alliance with the Dutch Republic; Talbot was appointed colonel of a Regiment of Dragoons, but the war ended before it saw service.

The 1679 Parliament was dominated by the Exclusion Crisis, over whether the Catholic James could succeed his brother as king. Talbot was MP for Chippenham; in Lord Shaftesbury's analysis of MPs, he is marked as opposing exclusion, or 'Vile'. In addition to his military offices, he is listed as receiving '£800 per year from the Wiltshire Excise, and the reversion of the Jewel Office', then held by Sir Gilbert.

Described by the French ambassador as 'very Protestant, and very Royalist', he summarised the dilemma of many, who supported James' right to the throne, but opposed concessions to Catholicism in general. In 1681, Talbot was elected for Ludgershall; the return was disputed, Parliament dissolved within a week, and he never took his seat.

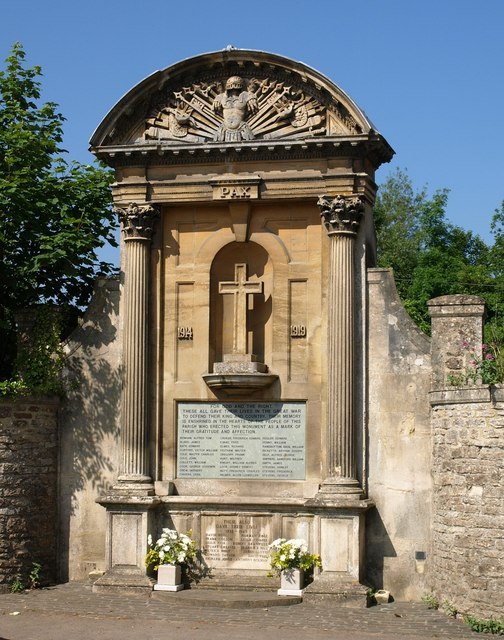
Lacock's 1914–1918 war memorial; the facade and columns came from Sir John's tomb, removed during 19th century renovation works

James succeeded as monarch in February 1685, and in March, Talbot was elected for Devizes in the Loyal Parliament, so-called for the large majority who backed his right to the throne. When the Monmouth Rebellion began in June, he raised a troop of horse, which was disbanded after the revolt collapsed. However, James used the opportunity to expand the Royal Army, and Talbot became lieutenant-colonel of Lord Peterborough's dragoons.

In a measure of how seriously James misjudged the situation, Parliament refused to pass his religious policies, which were seen as undermining the Church of England. It was suspended in November 1685, and not held again during his reign. At the same time, resistance within the army to the appointment of Catholic officers resulted in the resignation of many senior officers. They included Lord Lumley, whom Talbot replaced as colonel of the Queen Dowager's dragoons in January 1687.

By 1688, James had alienated much of his support base, except for loyalists like Talbot, and his uncle, Sir Gilbert. In the November 1688 Glorious Revolution, William of Orange landed in Torbay. The majority of the Royal Army defected, Talbot being one of the few to return his commission to James in person, on 20 December 1688.

This ended his military career; in 1690, he refused to swear allegiance to Mary II and William III, which meant he was ineligible for any public offices. Many High Church Tories like Talbot did so because they felt bound by their original oath, not necessarily because they were Jacobites; he was briefly held during the Jacobite invasion scare of 1692, and remained sympathetic, but does not appear to have been an active participant.

He died on 13 March 1714, leaving his estates to his grandson, James Ivory Talbot. He was buried in St Cyriac's Church, Lacock; his tomb was removed during 19th century renovation works, but parts of it were re-used for the 1914–1918 village war memorial.

== Sources ==
- Browning, Andrew (1953). English Historical Documents 1660-1714 Volume VI (1995 ed.). Routledge. ISBN 978-0415143714.
- Brydges, Egerton (1812). Collins Peerage of England, Volume V. Rivington and others.
- Cannon, Richard (1839). Historical Record of the Sixth Regiment of Dragoon Guards, or the Carabineers. HMSO.
- Childs, John (1976). The Army of Charles II. Routledge & Kegan Paul. ISBN 978-0710083012.
- Crosette, JS P (1983). TALBOT, Sir Gilbert (c.1606-95), of Whitehall and Lacock Abbey, Wilts in The History of Parliament: the House of Commons 1660–1690. Haynes Publishing. ISBN 978-0436192746.
- Dalton, Charles (1892). English Army Lists and Commission Registers, 1661–1714, Volume I, 1661–1685. Eyre & Spottiswode.
- "Devizes and Winchester, September-October 1645". BCW Project.
- Harris, Tim (2007). Revolution; the Great Crisis of the British Monarchy 1685-1720. Penguin. ISBN 978-0141016528.
- Helms, M.W.; Henning, Basil Duke (1983). "TALBOT, John (1630-1714), of Lacock Abbey, Wilts., Long Acre, Westminster and Salwarp, Worcs". In Henning, Basil Duke (ed.). The History of Parliament:the House of Commons 1660-1690. Boydell and Brewer.
- Jesse, John Heneage (1843). Memoirs Of The Court Of England, From The Revolution In 1688 To The Death Of George The Second, Volume 3 (2015 ed.). Palala Press. ISBN 978-1342803641.
- Lesaffer, Randall. "The Wars of Louis XIV in Treaties (Part V): The Peace of Nijmegen (1678–1679)". Oxford Public International Law.
- Shaw, William (1906). The Knights of England, Volume II. Sherratt and Hughes.
- Smith, G (2003). The Cavaliers in Exile 1640–1660. AAIA. ISBN 978-1403911681.
