= William Stockdale =

English politician and landowner

William Stockdale (c. 1634 – 3 March 1693) was an English politician who sat in the House of Commons in 1660.

Stockdale was the son of Thomas Stockdale of Bilton Park, Yorkshire and was baptised at Knaresborough on 3 January 1635. He was at Knaresborough School under Mr Bateson and was admitted at St John's College, Cambridge on 23 June 1652 aged 17.

In 1660, Stockdale was elected Member of Parliament for Knaresborough in the Convention Parliament. He was re-elected in 1661 for the Cavalier Parliament and retained his seat in further parliaments until his death in 1693.

Stockdale died at the age of 58 and was buried at Knaresborough on 22 March 1693.
