= John George Smyth (1815–1869) =

John George Smyth JP DL MP

Member of Parliament for City of York
- In office 28 August 1847 – 11 July 1865

Personal details
- Born: 5 February 1815
- Died: 10 June 1869 (aged 54)
- Party: Conservative
- Spouse: Hon. Diana Bosville-Macdonald
- Parents: John Henry Smyth (father); Lady Elizabeth Anne FitzRoy (mother)

John George Smyth JP DL MP (5 February 1815 – 10 June 1869) was a Conservative member of Parliament for the City of York from August 28, 1847 to July 11, 1865.

Smyth was the eldest son of John Henry Smyth (1780–1822), of Heath Hall, Wakefield, Yorkshire, a Whig MP for Cambridge University (1812–1822) and Lady Elizabeth Anne FitzRoy, daughter of George FitzRoy, 4th Duke of Grafton. His younger brother, Henry Smyth, was an Army officer and the grandfather of Sir John Smyth, 1st Baronet, recipient of the Victoria Cross.

== Personal life ==
Smyth married the Honourable Diana Bosville Macdonald (12 April 1812 – 8 December 1880), daughter of Godfrey Macdonald, 3rd Baron Macdonald of Sleat, on 25 April 1837. They had two sons (who both died young) and four daughters. One, Diana, married Henry Lascelles, 4th Earl of Harewood; they were the paternal grandparents of Mary Lascelles and the diplomat Daniel Lascelles. Another, Louisa, married Sir John Thursby.

Preceded by William Milner; John George Smyth	Member of Parliament for City of York; 1857 – 1865; With: Joshua Westhead	Succeeded by George Leeman; James Lowther
