= Sir Richard Hutton, the younger =

Sir Richard Hutton, the younger (1594 – 15 October 1645) was a Yorkshire landowner and Member of Parliament for Knaresborough who lost his life in the English Civil War.

Sir Richard Hutton inherited substantial estates at Goldsborough and Flaxby including the Jacobean Goldsborough Hall on the death of his father. He was the second but oldest surviving son of Sir Richard Hutton (1560–1639), the lawyer who had defied Charles I over ship money.

He was firstly married to Anne Paulet, then to Margaret Wentworth whose brother was Thomas Wentworth, 1st Earl of Strafford, (who was impeached by the Long Parliament and beheaded in 1641). He was thirdly married to Elizabeth Jackson (d. 1681), daughter of Sir John Jackson.

Sir Richard Hutton, the younger was knighted by Charles I in 1625 and became one of the two MPs for Knaresborough during the 1620s. He was High Sheriff of Yorkshire and Governor of Knaresborough Castle when the English Civil War broke out and joined the Royalist Army as a colonel.

Sir Richard defended Knaresborough Castle for four years until Sir Thomas Fairfax attacked. He fought at the Battle of Marston Moor and was taken prisoner in 1644 though he escaped along with his friend Sir Henry Slingsby to York. York finally surrendered to Fairfax and the Scots and Hutton and Slingsby marched with their men to rejoin the Royalist army. Meanwhile, Goldsborough Hall had been occupied by Oliver Cromwell's army and the Hall still has hooks in the attic where Cromwell's men would have hung their hammocks. There is an account by Sir Henry Slingsby of the march from York to Otley via Knaresborough escorted by the Parliamentarian troops. According to Sir Henry, on the second day they passed Goldsborough where Edward Whalley, Cromwell's cousin and Lieutenant Colonel, was billeted with his men. Whalley invited Sir Richard to leave the army and return with him to his house and family at Goldsborough. However Sir Richard declined saying that he was firmly attached to the Royalist cause.

Sir Richard left their escort at Otley and marched on to Skipton and into Lancashire. He was killed on 15 October 1645 at the battle of Sherburn-in-Elmet while Slingsby survived the civil war but was beheaded in 1658.

On the death of Sir Richard, his son Richard Hutton Esq took over the estate. He was involved in a royalist plot along with his father's friend Sir Henry Slingsby and imprisoned in Hull. His daughter Mary married Philip Wharton, son of Sir Thomas Wharton. Their daughter also called Mary married distant cousin Col Robert Byerley of Byerley Turk fame, running the Goldsborough Hall estate together.

== Books ==
- The Legacy: The Huttons of Penrith and Beetham by Barbara C Lee, publ. Titus Wilson & Son, Kendal, ISBN 0-9531444-0-2 is a history of the Hutton family with extensive references to Sir Richard Hutton, the younger.
- Without Touch of Dishonour, The Life and Death of Sir Henry Slingsby 1602-1658 by Geoffrey Ridsdill Smith, publ. The Roundwood Press, 1968, ISBN 0-900093-01-3 is a biography of Sir Henry Slingsby with extracts from his diary. The diary contains numerous references to Sir Richard Hutton, the younger.
- The History of the Ancient Borough of Pontefract by Benjamin Boothroyd, printed by and for the author, 1807 details Sir Richard Hutton, the younger's involvement in the sieges of Pontefract Castle during the English Civil War and his death at the battle of Sherburn-in-Elmet.
- The History of the Castle, Town and Forest of Knaresborough with Harrogate and its Medicinal Waters by Ely Hargrove, printed by Hargrove and Sons, Knaresborough, 1809 gives a brief history of the Huttons of 'Goldesburgh', 'Goldesburgh Hall' and Church.

Parliament of England
Preceded by Sir Henry Slingsby; William Beecher	Member of Parliament for Knaresborough; 1621–1625; With: Sir Henry Slingsby 1621–1624; Sir Henry Slingsby 1625	Succeeded by Sir Richard Hutton; Henry Benson
