= Clareton =

Village in North Yorkshire, England

Coordinates: 54.02°N 1.39°W

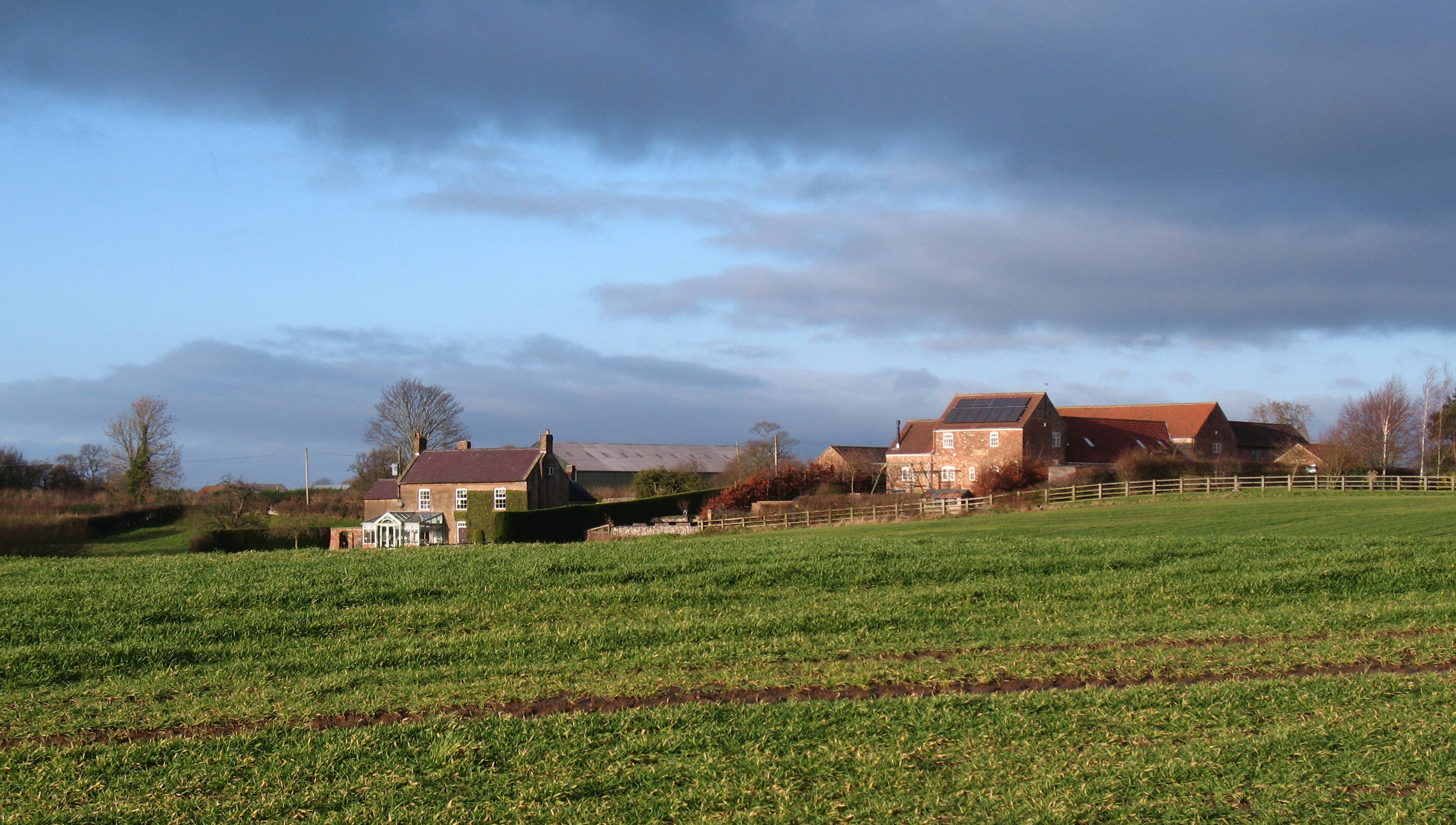

- Location within North Yorkshire
- Civil parish: Coneythorpe and Clareton
- Unitary authority: North Yorkshire
- Ceremonial county: North Yorkshire
- Region: Yorkshire and the Humber
- Country: England
- Sovereign state: United Kingdom
- Post town: KNARESBOROUGH
- Postcode district: HG5
- Police: North Yorkshire
- Fire: North Yorkshire
- Ambulance: Yorkshire
- UK Parliament: Harrogate and Knaresborough

Clareton is a hamlet in the civil parish of Coneythorpe and Clareton, in North Yorkshire, England. Since 24 March 1888 it has shared a civil parish with the neighbouring village of Coneythorpe, to the southwest. Its name is said to come from the meeting place, a local hill, of the ancient Wapentake of Claro.

Unlike Coneythorpe, Clareton is recorded in the Domesday Book. In 1066 Clareton was worth £10, but by 1086 only £2 15s., with much of the land being waste following the Harrying of the North.

Until 1974 the hamlet was within the West Riding of Yorkshire, and, until 2023, Clareton was then part of the Borough of Harrogate. It is now administered by the unitary North Yorkshire Council.
