= Sir Henry Slingsby, 1st Baronet =

English soldier and politician

Sir Henry Slingsby
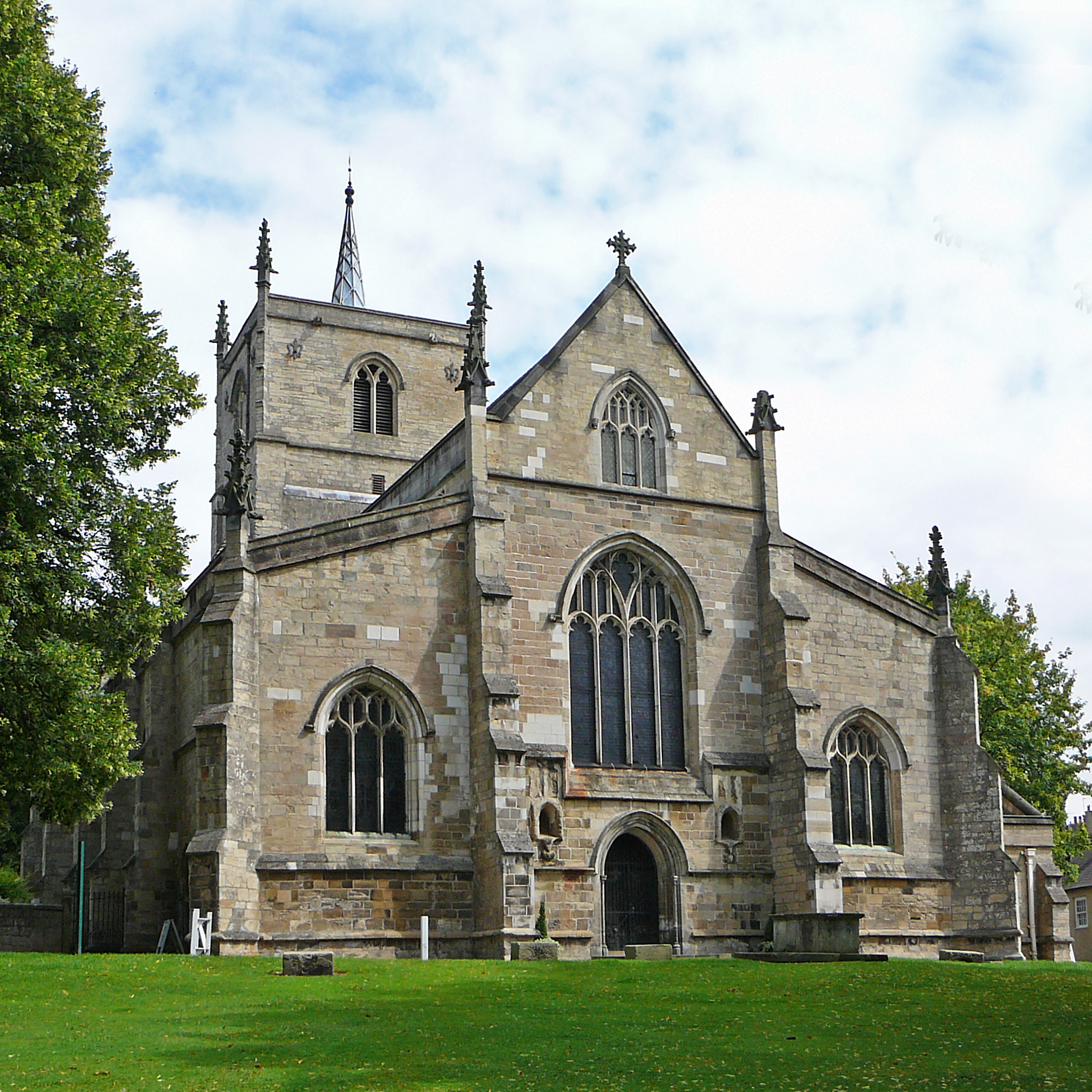
- St John the Baptist Church, Knaresborough; burial site of Sir Henry Slingsby

Member of Parliament for Knaresborough April 1640; June to August 1625
- In office November 1640 – September 1642 (excluded)

Personal details
- Born: 14 January 1602 Scriven Yorkshire
- Died: 8 June 1658 (aged 56) Tower Hill, London
- Resting place: St John the Baptist Church, Knaresborough
- Party: Royalist
- Spouse: Barbara Belasyse (1631–1641)
- Children: Thomas (1636–1688); Henry (1638–1701); Barbara (1633–1703)
- Education: Queens' College, Cambridge
- Occupation: Landowner and soldier

Military service
- Allegiance: Royalist
- Rank: Colonel
- Unit: Sir Henry Slingsby’s Regiment of Foot
- Battles/wars: Wars of the Three Kingdoms; Siege of York; Naseby; Siege of Newark

Sir Henry Slingsby of Scriven, 1st Baronet, 14 January 1602 – 8 June 1658, was an English landowner, politician and soldier who sat in the House of Commons at various times between 1625 and 1642. A Royalist during the Wars of the Three Kingdoms, he was executed in 1658 for his part in a conspiracy to restore Charles II.

First published in 1806, his ‘Memoirs’ for the years 1638 to 1648 are a valuable first-hand source for the First English Civil War in northern England.

== Personal details ==
Henry Slingsby was the second son of Sir Henry Slingsby (1560–1634), and Frances Vavasour; he became the heir in 1617 when his elder brother William was killed in Florence. He also had a younger brother Thomas, who died in France, and six sisters, Elizabeth, Mary (who married Sir Walter Bethell), Catherine (who married Sir John Fenwick, 1st Baronet), Alice, Frances and Eleanor (who married Sir Arthur Ingram the younger, eldest son and heir of Sir Arthur Ingram).

The Slingsbys were a large and well-connected family, with several branches distributed across Yorkshire; Henry's uncles included Sir Guylford Slingsby and Sir William Slingsby (1563–1634), Member of Parliament for the family-controlled seat of Knaresborough from 1597 to 1604.

In 1631, he married Barbara Belasyse (1610–1641), daughter of Viscount Fauconberg; they had three children who survived into adulthood, Thomas (1636–1688), Henry (1638–1701) and Barbara (1633–1703).

== Career; up to 1646 ==
Slingsby was educated at Queens' College, Cambridge, where he was influenced by the Puritan divine and preacher John Preston (1587–1628). Although his views later changed, in the 1630s his dislike of religious ceremony was so pronounced, the Archbishop of York refused to consecrate his personal chapel. In 1625, he succeeded his father as MP for Knaresborough; after this short-lived Parliament was dissolved, he travelled in Europe until 1628.

From 1629 to 1634, his father served on the Council of the North as deputy to the Earl of Strafford, while his cousin Guildford Slingsby acted as his personal secretary. Strafford quarrelled with Slingsby's father-in-law Fauconberg and his brother-in-law Henry, which may explain why he was not appointed Justice of the Peace after his father's death in 1634. He played little part in local politics and concentrated on improving the family estates; his success allowed him to purchase a baronetcy in 1638.

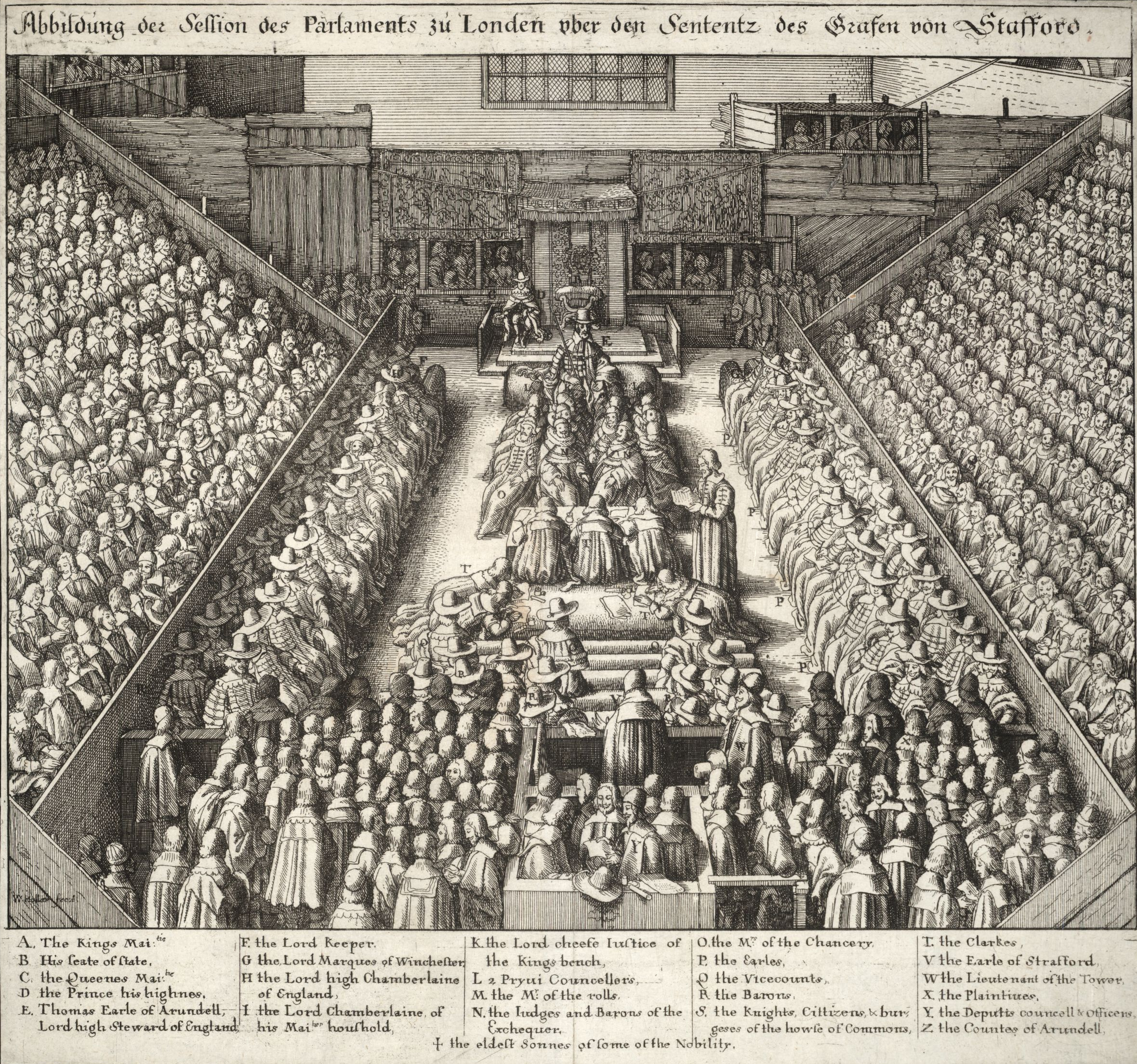
Trial of the Earl of Strafford, 1641; Slingsby was one of 59 from 263 MPs who voted against his execution

In 1638, he was appointed colonel of the City of York militia and during the first of the Bishops' Wars in 1639 served as a volunteer in a regiment raised by Earl of Holland. Elected as MP for Knaresborough in the 1640 Short and Long Parliaments, he made few interventions, being described as a 'gentleman of good understanding, but of a melancholy disposition and reserved in his speech’.

Based on his voting record, he was generally a loyal supporter of Charles I; in April 1641, he was among the 59 out of 263 MPs who voted against the execution of Strafford, and one of only six from Yorkshire to do so. Slingsby's vote shows the complexity of motives at this time, particularly in regard to religion; although he opposed removing bishops from the Church of England, he supported their exclusion from the Lords in February 1642, contrary to instructions from the Court.

In May 1642, Slingsby left London to join Charles in York and when the First English Civil War began in August, he was among the Royalist MPs to be excluded from Parliament. On 13 December, he received a commission to raise a regiment from the Earl of Newcastle, Royalist Captain-General in Northern England. In late February 1643, Queen Henrietta Maria landed at Bridlington from the Dutch Republic with a large consignment of weapons; Slingsby joined the escort of 5,000 men who accompanied her to the Royalist war-time capital of Oxford, before returning to York.

Slingsby's regiment formed part of the city garrison and missed the defeat at the Battle of Marston Moor on 2 July 1644, where the dead included his nephew Colonel John Fenwick and his cousin Charles Slingsby. When York surrendered on 16 July, Slingsby joined Sir Marmaduke Langdale and the remnants of the Royalist Northern Horse, which reached Oxford in December. They fought at Naseby in June 1645, before accompanying Charles on his attempt to link up with Montrose in Scotland, which ended with defeat at Rowton Heath in September. He joined the garrison at Newark, commanded by his brother-in-law Lord Belasyse, which was being besieged by the Scottish army. Charles escaped from Oxford on 29 April 1646 to join the Scots outside Newark, and on 6 May ordered Belasyse to surrender, bringing the First English Civil War to an end.

== Career; Post Civil War ==
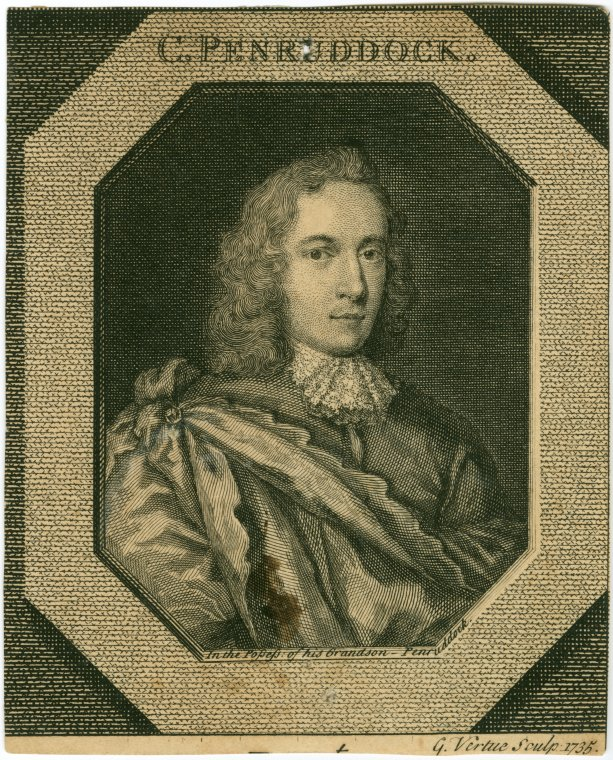
Engraving suggested as being Colonel John Penruddock; Slingsby was arrested for his alleged role in the 1655 Rising

Slingsby retired to his estates at Redhouse, near Moor Monkton where he wrote his memoirs but failed to agree with the terms of the Parliamentary Committee for Compounding with Delinquents. In his 'Memoirs' he explains his refusal as due to the requirement he swear an oath of loyalty to Parliament and take the Solemn League and Covenant, accepting a Presbyterian-structured Church of England; 'the one makes me renounce my allegiance, the other my religion'. Objections to the Covenant crossed the political divide; John Lilburne, the Parliamentarian political and religious radical, was another who did the same.

His estates were confiscated in 1651, despite the efforts of his Parliamentarian nephew Slingsby Bethell, son of his sister Mary, and the regicide Sir John Bourchier to have him exempted. Demonstrating how family networks often pre-empted politics, Bethell and other relatives purchased his lands for £11,200, which they held in trust for his children. Slingsby was arrested following the 1655 Penruddock uprising, a national revolt of which only the Wiltshire element took place and was quickly crushed. Often described as planned by the Sealed Knot, a small group of senior Royalists which included his brother-in-law Lord Belasyse, it was actually organised by a network referred to as the 'Action Party'. Although Slingsby was involved in the Royalist underground, Belasyse told the exiled Charles II the revolt had no hope of success and it seems unlikely he played a significant role.

Imprisoned in Hull, he allegedly tried to persuade officers within the garrison to deliver the port to Royalist forces, an action they reported to their superiors. At first, he was simply moved to York but when another plot was discovered in early 1658, the government decided to take a harder line; he was sent to London and found guilty of treason in March 1658. Despite efforts to have this sentence commuted by his relative Thomas Belasyse, who was Oliver Cromwell's son-in-law, he was executed on Tower Hill on 8 June 1658, along with another conspirator, John Hewett.

Shortly before his death, Slingsby wrote A father's legacy; Sir Henry Slingsbey's instructions to his sonnes, which was later published; his body was returned to his family and buried at St John the Baptist Church, Knaresborough. He was succeeded by his son Thomas, who supported James during the Exclusion Crisis and was suspected of being a Catholic.

== Sources ==
- Banner. "John Preston". The Banner of Truth.
- Hulse, Lynn; Ferris, John; Healy, Simon (2010). SLINGSBY, Henry (1602–1658), of Redhouse, Moor Monkton, Yorks in The History of Parliament: the House of Commons 1604–1629. CUP.
- Lay, Paul (2020). Providence Lost: The Rise and Fall of Cromwell's Protectorate. Head of Zeus. ISBN 978-1-78185-256-9.
- NMS (1981). SLINGSBY, William (1563–1634), of Kippax, Yorks. and Gray's Inn, London in The History of Parliament: the House of Commons 1558–1603. Boydell & Brewer.
- Peacey, David (2004). "Hewitt [Hewytt, Hewett], John". Oxford Dictionary of National Biography (online ed.). Oxford University Press. doi:10.1093/ref:odnb/13147. (Subscription, Wikipedia Library access or UK public library membership required.)
- Plant, David. "Sir Henry Slingsby's Regiment of Foot". BCW Project.
- Royle, Trevor (2006) [2004]. Civil War: The Wars of the Three Kingdoms 1638–1660. Abacus. ISBN 978-0-349-11564-1.
- Scott, David (2004). "Slingsby, Sir Henry, first baronet". Oxford Dictionary of National Biography (online ed.). Oxford University Press. doi:10.1093/ref:odnb/25727. (Subscription, Wikipedia Library access or UK public library membership required.)
- Sharp, Andrew (2004). "Lilburne, John". Oxford Dictionary of National Biography (online ed.). Oxford University Press. doi:10.1093/ref:odnb/16654. (Subscription, Wikipedia Library access or UK public library membership required.)
- Slingsby, Sir Henry (1836). Parsons, Daniel (ed.). The diary of Sir Henry Slingsby, of Scriven, bart. Longman, Rees, Orme, Brown, Green and Longman.
- Slingsby, Sir Henry; Hodgson, J (1806). Original Memoirs, written during The Great Civil War Being The Life of Sir Henry Slingsby And Memoirs of Capt Hodgson. Ballantyne & Co.
- Wedgwood, C.V. (1961). Thomas Wentworth, 1st Earl of Strafford 1593-1641- a revaluation (2000 ed.). Weidenfeld & Nicolson. ISBN 978-1842120811.

== Bibliography ==
- Smith, Geoffrey Ridsill (1968). Without Touch of Dishonour, The Life and Death of Sir Henry Slingsby 1602–1658. The Roundwood Press. ISBN 978-0-900093-01-2.; biography with extracts from his diary and family letters.
- Slingsby, Sir Henry (1658). A father's legacy; Sir Henry Slingsbey's instructions to his sonnes. Written a little before his death.

Parliament of England
Preceded by Sir Henry Slingsby; Sir Richard Hutton	Member of Parliament for Knaresborough; 1625; With: Sir Richard Hutton	Succeeded by Henry Benson; Sir Richard Hutton
Parliament suspended since 1629	Member of Parliament for Knaresborough; 1640–1642; With: Henry Benson 1640; William Deerlove 1641; Sir William Constable, Bt 1642	Succeeded by Sir William Constable, Bt
Baronetage of Nova Scotia
New creation	Baronet (of Scriven); 1638–1658	Succeeded by Thomas Slingsby
