= Listed buildings in Goldsborough, Harrogate =

Goldsborough is a civil parish in the county of North Yorkshire, England. It contains 13 listed buildings that are recorded in the National Heritage List for England. Of these, one is listed at Grade I, the highest of the three grades, one is at Grade II*, the middle grade, and the others are at Grade II, the lowest grade. The parish includes the village of Goldsborough and the surrounding countryside. The listed buildings consist of a church, houses and associated structures, farmhouses and farmbuildings, a public house, a pair of gate piers, and a milepost.

== Key ==
Grade	Criteria
I	Buildings of exceptional interest, sometimes considered to be internationally important
II*	Particularly important buildings of more than special interest
II	Buildings of national importance and special interest

== Buildings ==
Name and location	Photograph	Date	Notes	Grade
St Mary's Church; 53.99947°N 1.41513°W		12th century	The church has been altered and extended through the centuries, and was restored in 1859 by George Gilbert Scott. It is built in limestone with a Westmorland slate roof, and consists of a nave and chancel under one roof, north and south aisles, and a west tower. The tower has three stages, a moulded plinth, buttresses, two-light bell openings, gargoyles, and an embattled parapet. In the south aisle is a re-set Norman doorway with an inner order of zigzag decoration, an outer order of beak-head decoration, and columns with cushion capitals.	I
Goldsborough Hall; 53.99905°N 1.41630°W		c. 1625	A country house later converted and used for other purposes, it is in sandstone and red brick, with stone dressings, quoins, a parapet with ball finials, and a Westmorland slate roof. There are three storeys and cellars, and an oblong plan with fronts of five and three bays. In the centre of the entrance front is a two-storey porch with a round-arched opening, paired fluted Tuscan pilasters, and an entablature with a moulded cornice carried round the building as a string course. The outer bays contain two-storey canted bay windows, and above them and the porch is a balustrade. Above, the outer and middle bays are gabled and contain an oculus, and below are mullioned and transomed windows with hood moulds. The left return has a conservatory, and in the outer bays are full-height bay windows with balustrades.	II*
The Limes; 54.00020°N 1.41976°W		Mid 18th century	The house is in limestone with quoins and a stone slate roof. There are two storeys and three bays. In the centre is a doorway with a fanlight and a flat arch with a keystone. The windows are sashes with wood architraves, keystones, voussoirs, and stone sills.	II
Bay Horse Inn; 53.99992°N 1.41957°W		Mid to late 18th century	The public house is in limestone, with quoins, and a pantile roof with three eaves courses of stone, stone coping, and shaped kneelers. There are two storeys and three bays, and a continuous rear outshut. In the centre is a doorway with a plain lintel, and the windows are sashes in architraves. To the right is a single-storey extension, to the left is a two-storey three-bay wing, and there are later extensions at the rear.	II
Goldsborough Hall Cottages and Stansfield Court, wall and piers 53.99962°N 1.41602°W		Mid to late 18th century	The former stables of Goldsborough Hall have been converted for residential use. The building is in red-brown brick on a limestone plinth, and has hipped pantile roofs with two courses of flagstones. There are two storeys and two long ranges, each with a central round-headed carriage arch flanked by four bays, and three rear wings. The right carriage arch is plain, with an oculus above and a pyramidal roof, and the left carriage arch is similar but also with quoins and voussoirs. The doorways are paired, and the windows are sashes. The courtyard walls are in brick with flat coping, and the piers are in stone with brick panels, and have ball and cushion finials.	II
East View Farmhouse and walls 54.00007°N 1.42155°W		Late 18th century	The farmhouse is in red brick, with a sill band, and a pantile roof with two courses of stone flags. There are two storeys and three bays, the middle bay projecting with three sides and a hipped roof. The windows are horizontally-sliding sashes, and in the outer sides of the middle bay the windows are blind. All the windows are recessed under flat brick arches. The house is flanked by walls about 10 metres (33 ft) long containing round-arched doorways.	II
Barn north of East View Farmhouse; 54.00027°N 1.42164°W	—	Late 18th century	The barn is in red brick with a hipped pantile roof, and the gable end facing the street. In each side is a cart entrance with a cambered head, and around the barn are vents in various patterns.	II
Farm building south of East View Farmhouse; 53.99989°N 1.42165°W		Late 18th century	The farm building is in red brick, with a dentilled eaves cornice, a hipped pantile roof, and the gable end facing the street. In each side is a cart entrance with a cambered head, and around the barn are vents in various patterns.	II
Gate piers 54.00107°N 1.42179°W		Late 18th century	The gate piers flanking the road at the entrance to the village are square, and in rusticated stone. The inner pair are about 4 metres (13 ft) high, and each pier has a projecting band under an entablature with paterae, a stepped cap and a ball finial. The outer piers are about 3 metres (9.8 ft) high, and each has a projecting band and a shallow pyramidal cap.	II
Low Farmhouse; 54.00063°N 1.41152°W	—	Late 18th century	The farmhouse is in brick with a hipped pantile roof. There are two storeys, an L-shaped plan, a front range of three bays, and a lower two-storey one-bay extension to the right. The doorway is in the centre, above it is a recessed panel, and the windows are sashes with gauged brick flat arches and stone sills.	II
High House; 53.99975°N 1.42122°W		Early 19th century	The house is in brick with a pantile roof, two storeys and three bays. The central doorway has a fanlight, and the windows are sashes with flat brick arches and stone sills. In the right return are four blind windows in each floor.	II
Milepost; 54.00874°N 1.42405°W		19th century	The milepost on the south side of York Road (A69 road, is in cast iron on stone. It has a triangular plan and a rounded top, and is about 1 metre (3 ft 3 in) high. On the top is inscribed "Knaresborough and Green Hammerton Road" and "Goldsborough", on the left side is the distance to Knaresborough, and on the right side the distance to Green Hammerton.	II
Sundial, Goldsborough Hall; 53.99931°N 1.41704°W	—	19th century	The sundial in the garden to the west of the hall is in stone. It has a circular base and a three-sided shaft, and is about 1.2 metres (3 ft 11 in) high. The shaft is deeply carved with decoration, including C-scrolls, acanthus leaves and strap-work. On the sundial is an inscribed bronze plaque.	II
