= Henry Benson (MP) =

English politician

Henry Benson (c.1578 – 1643) of Knaresborough, Yorkshire was an English politician who sat in the House of Commons variously between 1626 and 1641.

He was born the son of Peter Benson, a Knaresborough yeoman farmer.

Benson was Deputy Steward of Knaresborough. In 1626 he was elected Member of Parliament for Knaresborough. He was re-elected in 1628 and sat until 1629 when King Charles decided to rule without parliament for eleven years.

In April 1640, Benson was re-elected MP for Knareborough in the Short Parliament. He was re-elected in November 1640 for the Long Parliament. However he was expelled from the House of Commons by vote on 2 November 1641 for selling protections to men who were not his servants. Benson declared that there was no better replacement for him than his son-in-law William Deerlove, although Deerlove's election was declared void.

Benson took arms for the King and in February 1642 was reported to be occupying Plumpton tower near Knaresborough with two cannon.

Benson married Elizabeth Deerlove, widow of John Deerlove, at Knaresborough in 1633. They had no children.

Parliament of England
Preceded by Sir Richard Hutton; Sir Henry Slingsby, 1st Baronet	Member of Parliament for Knaresborough; 1626–1629; With: Sir Richard Hutton, the younger 1	Parliament suspended until 1640
Vacant Parliament suspended since 1629	Member of Parliament for Knaresborough; 1640–1641; With: Sir Henry Slingsby, 1st Baronet	Succeeded by Sir Henry Slingsby, 1st Baronet; William Deerlove
