= William Beecher (died 1651) =

English diplomat, soldier and politician

Sir William Beecher (1580–1651) was an English diplomat, soldier and politician who sat in the House of Commons at various times between 1614 and 1629.

Beecher was Chargé d'Affaires in France from 1609 to 1610. In 1614, he was elected Member of Parliament for Knaresborough in the Addled Parliament. He was Agent or Chargé d'Affaires in Francs from 1617 to 1619. In 1621 he was elected MP for Shaftesbury and Leominster and was expelled at Shaftesbury. He was knighted in 1622. He served as Clerk of the Privy Council from 1623 until he resigned in 1641. In 1624 he was elected MP for Leominster again. He was elected MP for Dover in 1625 and for Ilchester in 1626. In 1627 he took part in the Siege of Saint-Martin-de-Ré when he commanded a small supply fleet with 400 raw troops. In 1629 he was elected MP for Windsor and sat until 1629 when King Charles decided to rule without parliament for eleven years. He was awarded MA at Cambridge University in 1629.

Beecher was of Durham Gate, The Strand, Westminster and of Putney, Surrey. He died in 1651.

Parliament of England
Preceded by Sir Henry Slingsby; William Slingsby	Member of Parliament for Knaresborough; 1614; With: Sir Henry Slingsby	Succeeded by Sir Henry Slingsby; Sir Richard Hutton
Preceded by Henry Croke; Sir Simeon Steward	Member of Parliament for Shaftesbury; 1621; With: Thomas Sheppard	Succeeded by Percy Herbert; Ralph Hopton
Preceded by Sir Humphrey Baskerville; Thomas Coningsby	Member of Parliament for Leominster; 1621–1624; With: Francis Smallman 1621–1622; James Tomkins	Succeeded by James Tomkins; Edward Littelton
Preceded by Sir Edward Cecil; Sir Richard Young	Member of Parliament for Dover; 1625; With: John Hippisley	Succeeded by John Hippisley; John Pringle
Preceded by Richard Wynn; Sir Robert Gorges	Member of Parliament for Ilchester; 1626; With: Robert Caesar	Succeeded by Sir Robert Gorges; Sir Henry Berkeley
Preceded by William Russell; Humphrey Newbury	Member of Parliament for Windsor; 1628–1629; With: Thomas Hewett	Parliament suspended until 1640
