= Goldsborough Hall =

Stately home in Goldsborough, North Yorkshire, England

Coordinates: 53.999065°N 1.416265°W

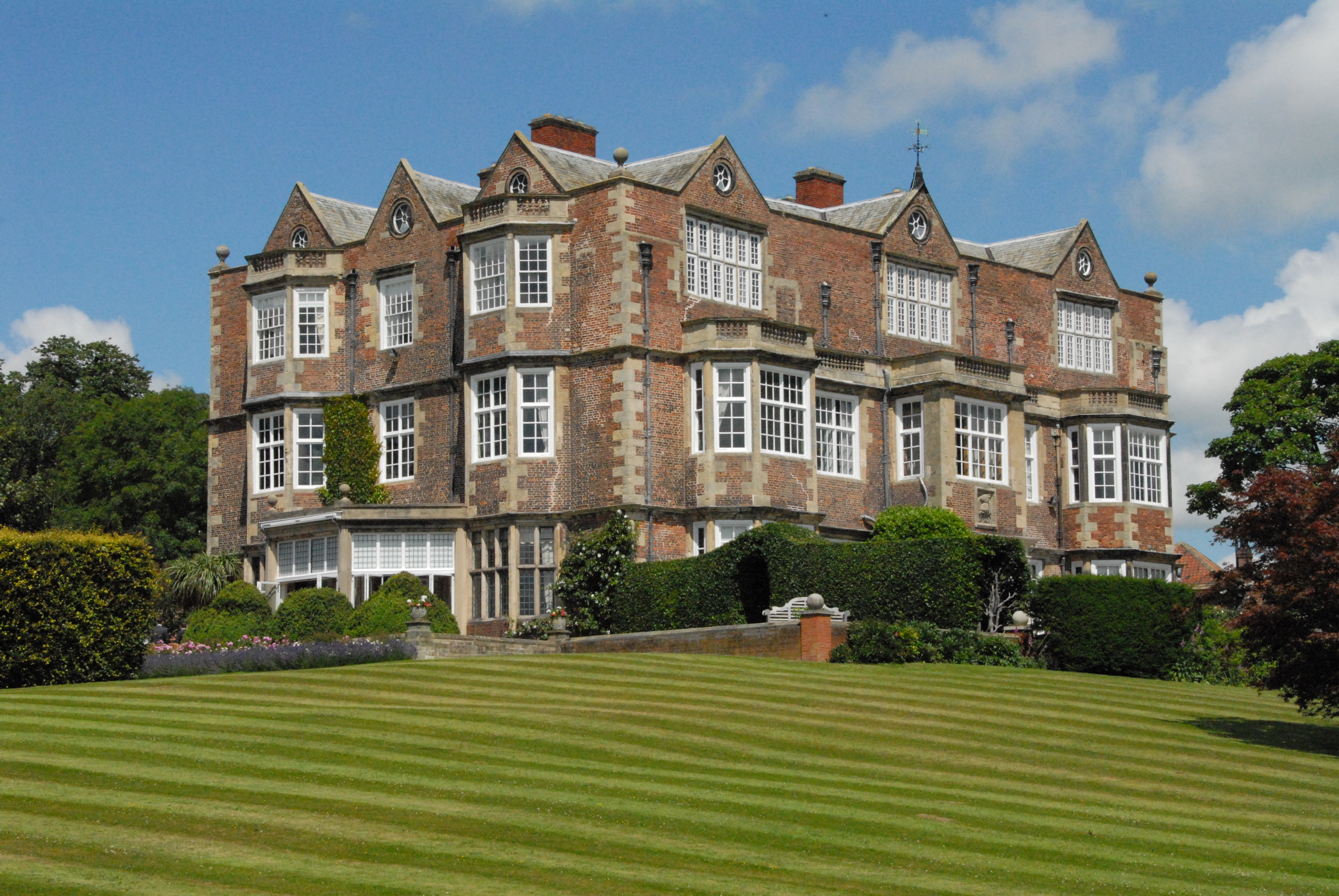
Goldsborough Hall

Goldsborough Hall is a Jacobean stately home in the village of Goldsborough, North Yorkshire, England. It is a member of the Historic Houses Association. The house itself is a Grade II* listed building. The Hall was built for Sir Richard Hutton (1560–1639) after he acquired the Goldsborough Estate in 1598, and in the 20th century it was home to Princess Mary, Countess of Harewood, as her first family home.

The original building still stands and is now a hotel and restaurant. The Hall and its gardens are open to the public only on certain days in the year.

== History to 1922 ==
The house was built from 1598 to 1625 for Sir Richard Hutton, a prominent lawyer in London, who became High Sheriff of Yorkshire in 1623. On his death, in 1639, the Hall passed to his son, also called Sir Richard Hutton. Sir Richard Hutton, the younger had been knighted by Charles I in 1625 and became one of two MPs for Knaresborough. He was High Sheriff of Yorkshire and Governor of Knaresborough Castle when the English Civil War broke out. During the Civil War, the house was forcibly occupied by Oliver Cromwell's army in 1644 while they besieged Knaresborough Castle. Sir Richard Hutton, the younger fought at the battle of Marston Moor in 1644 and was killed at Sherburn-in-Elmet in 1645.

The hall passed to the Wharton family when Sir Richard's daughter, Elizabeth, married the Hon Philip Wharton, nephew of Philip Wharton, 4th Baron Wharton. Her sister married Colonel Anthony Byerley of Middridge Grange. Their son Robert Byerley married Elizabeth and Philip's daughter, Mary Wharton in 1695. Robert Byerley was MP for County Durham and represented Knaresborough nine times between 1697 and 1710. He was a soldier and fought at the Battle of the Boyne in 1690. Captain (later Colonel) Robert Byerley possessed a fine brown horse, the Byerley Turk, which is the eldest founding father to all thoroughbred horses. The origins of the stallion are the subject of much speculation but it is known that the horse was put at stud at Goldsborough Hall and was buried at the Hall in 1706.

As Robert and Mary Byerley's five children all died without issue, the Hall was sold to Daniel Lascelles about 1760. Under Daniel the house was remodelled by John Carr and Robert Adam while they built Harewood House. When Daniel died without issue, the hall became part of the 24,000-acre Harewood estate. The Hall remained within the Lascelles family for 200 years, being used as Dower House, the heirs-in-waiting house, a hunting lodge, or even rented out when not needed for the viscount, earl in waiting. In the late 19th century the hall was rented out to Sir Andrew Fairbairn, a Liberal MP, while he was building his country house at Askham Grange and the estate at Askham Richards.

== HRH Princess Mary to Present ==
The Hall became the first family home of Mary, Princess Royal and Countess of Harewood and Viscount Lascelles, Henry Lascelles, 6th Earl of Harewood after their marriage in 1922. Their son, George Henry Hubert Lascelles, 7th Earl of Harewood was christened at the adjoining Goldsborough church on 25 March 1923, the service being attended by King George V and Queen Mary and presided over by Cosmo Lang, the Archbishop of York. The King and Queen visited their daughter and grandchildren George and Gerald Lascelles, and stayed at Goldsborough Hall on many occasions throughout the 1920s.

During the Second World War, Oatlands School, Harrogate (now the site of St Aidan's School) was stationed at the Hall. The owners of the school, the Boyer family, bought Goldsborough Hall from the Harewood estate in 1951. The rest of the village was sold at auction in 1952, ending 1,000 years of the estate village.

In 1966 the school closed and the Hanson family purchased the Hall and its land, reverting the Hall to a private house. Due to ill health, the Hansons had to sell the hall in 1977. It was sold to a Leeds-based developer, West and Sons, who further developed the Hall and, they, in turn sold the Hall to Mrs Elsie Sharpe-Day, who converted the building into a luxury country-house hotel that never opened.

In 1979 the Hall was acquired by Russell Stansfield Smith, who lived in the house as his family home before converting it into a 60-resident, 40-bedroom nursing home that opened in 1983. The Hall became the flagship of a group of nursing homes called Goldsborough Estates. In 1997 BUPA acquired Goldsborough Estates and looked at ways to bring the Hall to meet with modern standards in nursing practice. Due to the historic nature of the building, it was considered to be impractical and the Hall closed as a nursing home in May 2003 and was subsequently advertised for sale.

In 2005 the Hall was acquired by the Oglesby family, who reverted the Hall to a private family home. The Oglesby family also saved the Tiger Inn, in nearby Coneythorpe, from closure in 2024.

== Present day ==
The Hall required a vast amount of restoration and maintenance after being a nursing home for over 20 years and then empty for a further two years. The main state rooms have been refurbished and the hall now offers guest accommodation with 16 bedrooms and suites. An orangery was built in 2016 in order to host private weddings, corporate functions and events.

== Gardens and grounds ==
Daniel Lascelles employed garden designer Richard Woods (1715–1793) and a plan of improvements was drawn up in 1763, which modified the existing geometric layout recorded in 1738. However, Wood's plans were not implemented as he was replaced by Thomas White (1736–1811) in 1765, an ex-foreman of Capability Brown. White's plan created a new kitchen garden, landscaping around the western side of the hall, parkland to the south towards the Great Wood and the small plantation/pleasure ground to the east of the hall. The gardens and grounds were once again altered by Princess Mary and Viscount Lascelles in the 1920s with the planting of two long herbaceous borders flanked by beech hedges. A 34-tree quarter-mile Lime Tree Walk was planted from 1922 to 1930 when royalty visited including trees planted by Queen Mary and King George V. The gardens, neglected for years, have been replanted in a Gertrude Jekyll style that befits their original creation in the time of Princess Mary. The kitchen garden and glasshouse were built in 2018 supplying the hall's kitchens with fresh produce. The gardens are open to the public and also for two days a year under the National Gardens Scheme.

== See also ==
- Grade II* listed buildings in North Yorkshire (district)
- Listed buildings in Goldsborough, Harrogate

== Books ==
- The Legacy: The Huttons of Penrith and Beetham by Barbara C Lee, publ. Titus Wilson & Son, Kendal, (1997) ISBN 0-9531444-0-2 is a history of the Hutton family with extensive references to Sir Richard Hutton
- The History of the Castle, Town and Forest of Knaresborough with Harrogate and its Medicinal Waters by Ely Hargrove, printed by Hargrove and Sons, Knaresborough, 1809 gives a brief history of the Huttons of 'Goldesburgh', 'Goldesburgh Hall' and Church
- The Byerley Turk by Jeremy James, publ. Merlin Unwin Books, (2005) ISBN 978-1-873674-98-7 is a fictionalized account of the life of the Byerley Turk. It describes the Battle of Vienna and the Battle of Buda (1686), with a Turkish perspective.
- Byerley: The Thoroughbred's Ticking Time Bomb by Suzi Pritchard-Jones, (2021) ISBN 9781527284142
- Princess Mary, Viscountess Lascelles by Evelyn Graham, published by Hutchinson & Co, London (1929) recalls Princess Mary's days at Goldsborough Hall in Chapter XVII 'The New Homes: Chesterfield House and Goldsborough Hall' and Chapter XVIII 'Life at Goldsborough Hall'.
- Princess Mary: The First Modern Princess by Elisabeth Basford, published by The History Press (2021) ISBN 978-0750992619
- The Tongs and Bones: The Memoires of Lord Harewood, published by George Weidenfeld & Nicolson (1981), ISBN 0-297-77960-5. In the first chapter, Growing Up, Lord Harewood describes his childhood at Goldsborough Hall.
