= William Barron =

William Barron may refer to:

- William Augustus Barron (1751–1812), British landscape painter
- William Barron (gardener) (1805–1891), English gardener and garden designer
- William Barron (politician) (1837–1916), New Zealand member of parliament
- William Barron (U.S. Marshal), American businessman and public official in Vermont
- William N. Barron (1859–1935), English-born lawyer and businessman in Missouri
- Wally Barron (William Wallace Barron, 1911–2002), American politician in West Virginia
- Bill Barron (1917–2006), English footballer and cricketer
- Bill Barron (musician) (1927–1989), American jazz saxophonist
