= William Slingsby (disambiguation) =

William Slingsby was a soldier.

William Slingsby may also refer to:

- William Cecil Slingsby, English mountain climber and alpine explorer
- William Slingsby (MP) for Bodmin (UK Parliament constituency)
