= Henry Slingsby (died 1634) =

English landowner and politician (1560–1634)

Sir Henry Slingsby (1560 – 17 December 1634) was an English landowner and politician who sat in the House of Commons between 1601 and 1624.

== Biography ==
Slingsby born in 1560, the fourth, but ultimately eldest surviving son of Francis Slingsby, and his wife Mary Percy. His uncle was Henry Percy, 8th Earl of Northumberland. He held a number of offices including feodary for the Duchy of Lancaster and feodary of Tickhill. He was receiver of Pontefract Castle, and was receiver surveyor and collector of Knaresborough and Wakefield in 1588. He was janitor and deputy keeper of Knaresborough Castle and bailiff and coroner within the liberty of Knaresborough. He was chief forester of Knaresborough and Wharfedale and was custodian of Bilton park in about 1600. He succeeded to the estates of his father in 1600.

In 1601, Slingsby was elected Member of Parliament for Knaresborough. He was also J.P. for the West Riding of Yorkshire in 1601. He was knighted in 1602. From 1603, he was a member of the council in the north. In 1604, he was re-elected MP for Knaresborough. He was Sheriff of Yorkshire from 1611 to 1612. In 1614, he was elected MP for Knaresborough again and was re-elected in 1621 and 1624.

From 1607, Slingsby rebuilt the family home, Red House, Moor Monkton. Slingsby died at Nun Monkton, Yorkshire, at the age of about 74 and was buried on 28 December in the family chapel in Knaresborough church.

Slingsby married Frances Vavasour daughter of William Vavasour of Weston and had at least five sons of whom 2 died in infancy and seven daughters. His eldest son was Sir Henry Slingsby, 1st Baronet. His wife died on 24 July 1611.

Parliament of England
Preceded by Hugh Beeston; William Slingsby	Member of Parliament for Knaresborough; 1601–1624; With: William Slingsby 1601–1611; William Beecher 1614; Sir Richard Hutton 1621–1624	Succeeded by Sir Richard Hutton; Sir Henry Slingsby
