= Wytham baronets =

Extinct baronetcy in the Baronetage of England

Arms of Wytham of Goldsborough

The Wytham Baronetcy, of Goldsborough in the County of York, was a title in the Baronetage of England. It was created on 13 December 1683 for John Wytham. The title became extinct on his death in 1689.

== Wytham baronets, of Goldsborough (1683) ==
- Sir John Wytham, 1st Baronet (c. 1644–1689)
