= Coneythorpe =

Village in North Yorkshire, England

Coordinates: 54.01°N 01.40°W

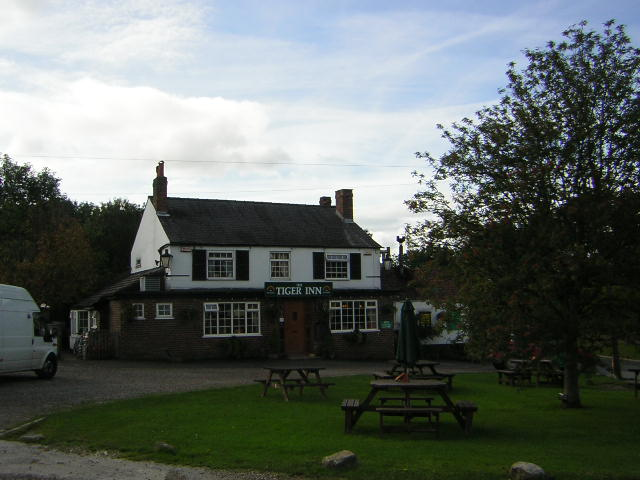
- Tiger Inn

- Location within North Yorkshire
- OS grid reference: SE393589
  - London: 180 mi (290 km) SSE
- Civil parish: Coneythorpe and Clareton
- Unitary authority: North Yorkshire
- Ceremonial county: North Yorkshire
- Region: Yorkshire and the Humber
- Country: England
- Sovereign state: United Kingdom
- Post town: KNARESBOROUGH
- Postcode district: HG5
- Police: North Yorkshire
- Fire: North Yorkshire
- Ambulance: Yorkshire

Coneythorpe is a village in the civil parish of Coneythorpe and Clareton, in North Yorkshire, England. It is situated less than 1 mile (1.6 km) west from the A1(M) motorway. Until 1974 it was part of the West Riding of Yorkshire. From 1974 to 2023 it was part of the Borough of Harrogate, it is now administered by the unitary North Yorkshire Council.

Coneythorpe was formerly a township in the parish of Goldsborough, in 1866 Coneythorpe became a separate civil parish, on 24 March 1888 the parish was abolished and merged with Clareton to form "Coneythorpe and Clareton". In 1881 the parish had a population of 79.

The Tiger Inn, the village pub, has been in its current position since the 19th century. After destructive fires in 2020 and 2023, it was bought and saved in 2024 by the Oglesby family, of nearby Goldsborough Hall.
