= Coneythorpe and Clareton =

Civil parish in North Yorkshire, England

- Civil parish
- The road to Arkendale
- Interactive map of Coneythorpe and Clareton
- Coordinates: 54.0298°N 1.3957°W
- Country: England
- Ceremonial county: North Yorkshire
- Unitary authority: North Yorkshire

Area
  - Total: 326 ha (810 acres)
- Elevation: 50 m (160 ft)

Population (2021)
  - Total: 95
  - Density: 29/km^{2} (75/sq mi)
- Time zone: UTC00:00
- Post Code: HG5 0SA
- ONS parish code: E04007326

Coneythorpe and Clareton is a civil parish near to Knaresborough, in North Yorkshire, England. Historically, the area was in the wapentake of Claro, part of the West Riding of Yorkshire, but was moved into North Yorkshire in 1974. In 2021 the parish had a population of 95.

== History ==
The parish lies 6.4 kilometres (4 mi) north-east of Knaresborough and is mostly on the western side of the A1(M), though a portion does cross the motorway. Both Clareton and Coneythorpe were separate settlements or townships, and were joined as a civil parish in 1888. Historically, the area consisted of two townships, Clareton in the ancient parish of Allerton Mauleverer, and Coneythorpe in the parish of Goldsborough. Both were created as separate parishes in 1866, and then a united parish in 1888. The 1888 parish was part of the wapentake of Claro, and was in the Nidderdale Rural District. It was moved into North Yorkshire from the old West Riding of Yorkshire in 1974. From 1974 to 2023 it was part of the Borough of Harrogate, it is now administered by the unitary North Yorkshire Council.

The small settlement of Clareton was mentioned in the Domesday Book, but now consists of only a few buildings. The parish comes under the Harrogate and Knaresborough Constituency.

=== Population ===
Population of Coneythorpe and Coneythorpe with Clareton 1801–2015
Year	1801	1811	1821	1831	1841	1851	1861	1871	1881	1891	1901	1911	1921	1931	1951	1961	1971	2001	2011	2015	2021
Clareton Population		19	14	20	19	17	22	24	15	15	7										
Parish population						142				95	101	88	77	91	46	44	37	100	110 (Note: Estimated)	110 (Note: Estimated)	95
Coneythorpe population	99	112	112	96	118	125	115	83	79	80	94										

The parish of Coneythorpe with Clareton was created in 1888, but at the next two census returns, the population was recorded individually for each settlement as well as a combined number for the parish. Similarly, the separate parishes of Clareton and Coneythorpe were not created until 1866, but their populations were recorded as Coneythorpe with Clareton parish in 1851. In 1961, the parish covered an area of 327 hectares (810 acres) and had a population of 44, which gave a population density of 0.11 people per hectare. In 2001, the parish, now named Coneythopre and Clareton covered 326 hectares (810 acres) with a population of 100, which gave a population density of 0.31 per hectare (31 per square kilometre).
