= Hugh Barron =

English painter

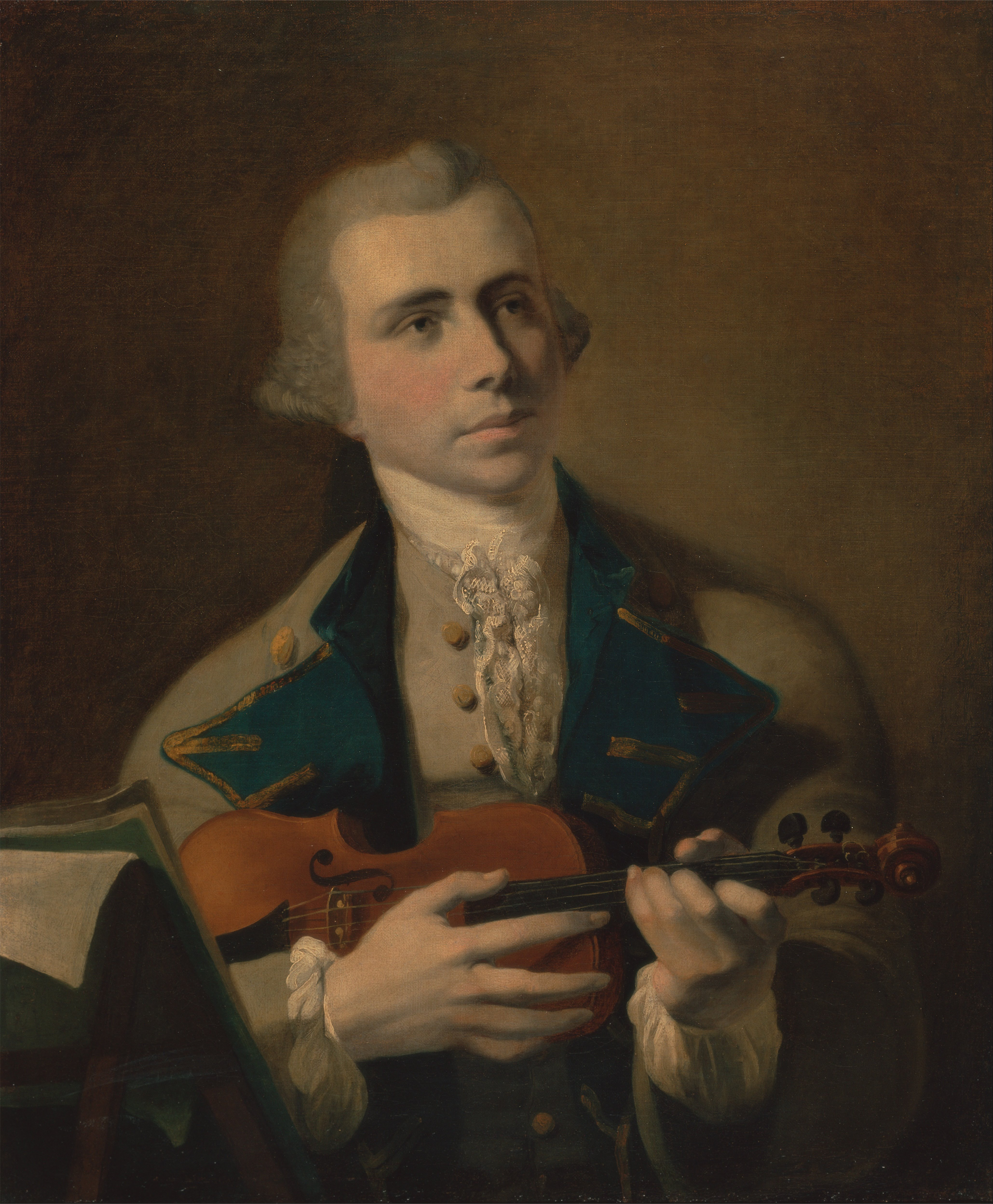
Hugh Barron

Hugh Barron (c. 1746 – 1791) was an English portrait painter and amateur musician.

== Life ==
Barron was the son of an apothecary in Soho, London, and became a pupil of Sir Joshua Reynolds. After leaving Reynolds' studio he set off for Italy by way of Lisbon, where he stopped for some time and painted portraits. In 1771-2 he was in Rome. Returning to London he settled in Leicester Square, and exhibited some portraits at the Royal Academy in 1782-3 and 1786. However, his later work did not fulfil the promise of his youth, and he never approached the quality of work of his teacher. His painting The Children of George Bond of Ditchleys (1768) is in the collection of the Tate Gallery.

Mezzotints by Valentine Green were published after Barron's portraits of John Swan and George Bridges Rodney, 1st Baron Rodney.

He was a good violinist, considered the best amateur performer of his time. He died in the autumn of 1791, aged about forty-five.

He is the elder brother of the painter William Augustus Barron.
