= William Augustus Barron =

British painter

- Born: 1751; London, England
- Died: 1812

William Augustus Barron (1751–1812) was a British landscape painter.

== Life ==
He was a pupil of William Tomkins and younger brother of Hugh Barron. In 1766, he gained a premium at the Society of Arts. He practised as a landscape painter, and also as a drawing master. Like his brother, he excelled as a performer upon the violin; like him, also, he reached no more than a moderate excellence in his proper profession. His skill upon the violin gained him an introduction to Sir Edward Walpole, who gave him a situation in the exchequer, which in 1808 he still held.

A view of Wanstead House by this artist was engraved by Picot in 1775; also after him are a set of views of castles and other subjects taken in different parts of Essex. In the print-room of the British Museum, there is a large pen drawing by him of Richmond Bridge in 1778.
