= William Hargrove =

English newspaper proprietor and historian

William Hargrove (16 October 1788 – 29 August 1862) was an English newspaper proprietor and historian of York.

== Life ==
Born at Knaresborough, Yorkshire, on 16 October 1788, he was the youngest of the four children of Ely Hargrove, by his second wife. Being intended for the church he was placed under the care of his godfather, Robert Wyrell, at that time curate of Knaresborough. But Wyrell recommended that his pupil should be trained as a journalist. He was accordingly apprenticed to Mr. Smart of Huddersfield.

After the expiration of his articles Hargrove returned to Knaresborough, but in 1813 he purchased, with two partners, the York Herald, then a weekly newspaper. He moved to York, and the first number of the York Herald under his management was published on 13 July 1813. For the next 35 years he edited the paper. He added to the staff a reporter, and engaged a correspondent in nearly every town in Yorkshire. Hargrove subsequently bought the shares in the business of his two sleeping partners.

In October 1818 Hargrove entered the corporation of York as a common councilman for Bootham ward. He defended Queen Caroline in the York Herald, and announced her acquittal in 1820 by torchlight from the steps of the Mansion House. In 1827 he successfully promoted, along with Charles Wellbeloved, a scheme for the erection of a Mechanics' Institute, of which he became the first secretary and treasurer. In 1831 he was elected a sheriff of York.

Hargrove collected the Roman and mediaeval remains excavated in and around York. About ten years before his death he transferred the whole collection to the museum of the Yorkshire Philosophical Society. He died at York on 29 August 1862.

== Works ==
In 1818 Hargrove published a History and Description of the ancient City of York; comprising all the most interesting information already published in Drake's "Eboracum," with much new matter and illustrations. He had first planned to reprint Francis Drake's Eboracum, but did not have enough support.

Hargrove also published the York Poetical Miscellany; being selections from the best Authors (1835). He was a contributor to the poets' corner of the York Herald and the York Courant, and to magazines. He also issued A New Guide for Strangers and Residents in the City of York. ... Hargrove's pocket edition, illustrated (1842).

== Editorship of York Herald ==
Hargrove was editor and from June 1813 was owner of The York Herald. This started as a Whig newspaper, but gradually became more Tory as Hargrove came to support George Hudson. [Brett, Peter. 1989. The Rise and Fall of the York Whig Club 1818-1830. Borthwick Paper No. 76. York, Borthwick Institute of Historical Research.]

Hargrove supported the York Society of Political Protestants (founded 3 July 1819), whose aims included annual parliaments and universal suffrage. AJ Peacock infers that the YSPP was absorbed by the York Whig Club in January–June 1820 (Peacock 1976:150). [AJ Peacock. 1976. “Edmund Gill, Poet, Son of Crispin, and Political Protestant.” York History 3: c.150.]

== Family ==
By his marriage on 2 September 1823 to Mary Sarah, daughter of William Frobisher, banker, of Halifax, Hargrove had a numerous family. His eldest sons, Alfred Ely Hargrove (1824-1894) and William Wallace Hargrove, took over the management of the York Herald, which became a daily paper on 1 January 1874.

== Notes ==
Attribution

This article incorporates text from a publication now in the public domain: Goodwin, Gordon (1890). "Hargrove, William". In Stephen, Leslie; Lee, Sidney (eds.). Dictionary of National Biography. Vol. 24. London: Smith, Elder & Co.
