= James Tomkins (MP) =

English politician (c.1569–1636)

James Tomkins (c. 1569 – 7 October 1636) was an English politician who sat in the House of Commons between 1624 and 1629.

Tomkins was the eldest son of Richard Tomkins of Monnington on Wye, Herefordshire, educated at Gloucester Hall, Oxford (1583) and trained in the law at the New Inn and the Middle Temple (1589). He succeeded his father in 1603, inheriting the manors of Monnington and Garnestone, a considerable domain south of Weobley.

He was appointed for life to the Herefordshire bench in 1605 as a justice of the peace and as High Sheriff of Herefordshire for 1606–07. In 1624, he was elected member of parliament for Leominster and was re-elected in 1625 and 1626. Tomkins was instrumental in restoring the franchise to the borough of Weobley in 1628, when his son William was returned. Tomkins himself was re-elected MP for Leominster in 1628 and sat until 1629 when King Charles decided to rule without parliament for eleven years.

Tomkins was much esteemed as a country gentleman and noted debater in the House of Commons. He married Anne, the daughter and co-heiress of James Boyle of Hereford; they had five sons (three of whom predeceased him) and a daughter.

Parliament of England
Preceded by Francis Smallman; William Beecher	Member of Parliament for Leominster; 1624–1629; With: Sir William Beecher 1624; Edward Littleton 1625– 1628; Thomas Lyttelton 1628–1629	Parliament suspended until 1640
