= St Mary's Church, Goldsborough =

Church in North Yorkshire, England

Coordinates: 53°59′58″N 1°24′54″W

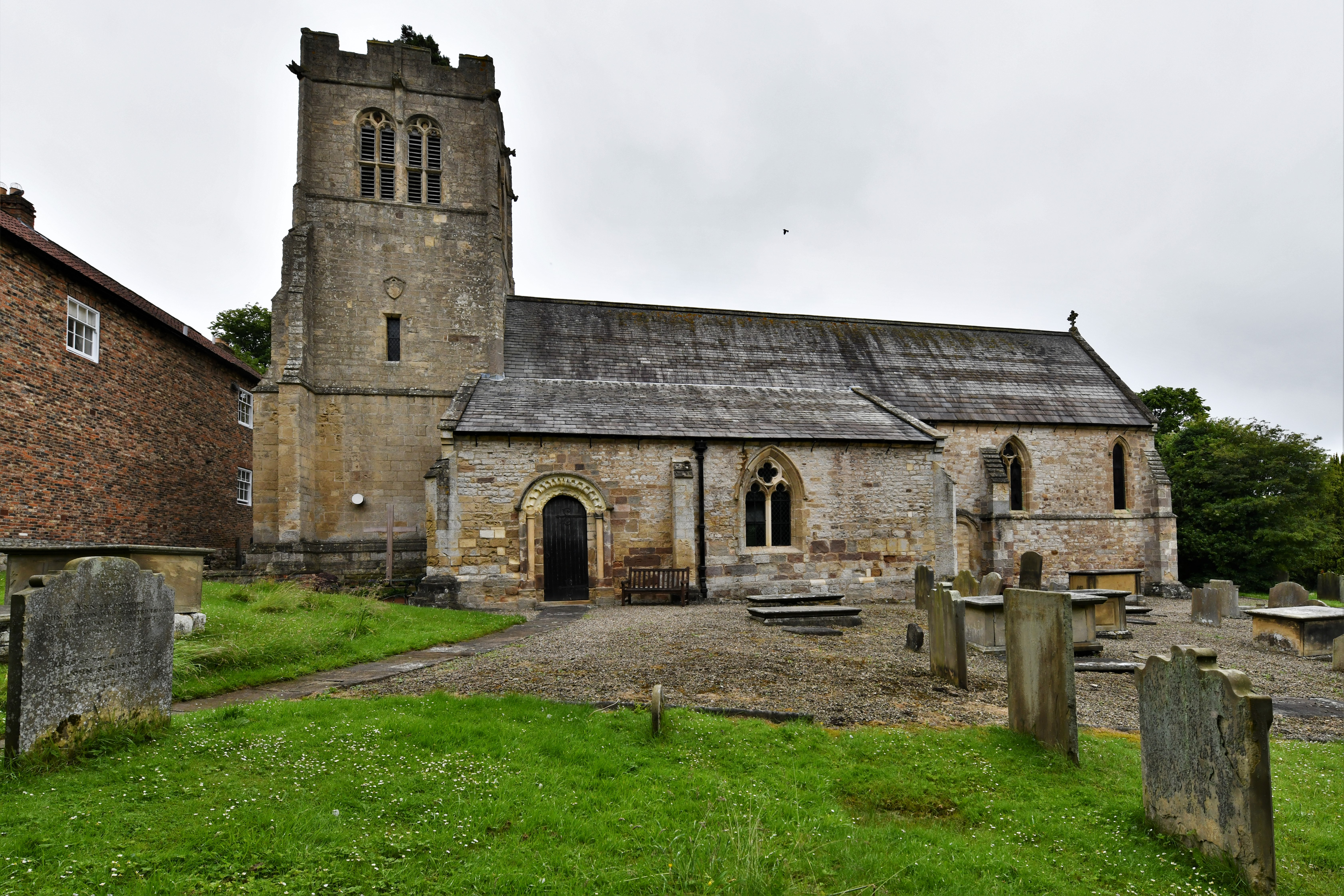
The church, in 2019

St Mary's Church is the parish church of Goldsborough, a village near Harrogate in North Yorkshire, in England.

The church appears to have first been built in the 12th century, from which period survive the south door and perhaps some walling at the ends of the nave. The remainder of the building dates from the 13th and 14th century, during which time the door may have been relocated. The church was restored in 1750, with funding from Ann and Elizabeth Byerley, and again in 1859, to designs by George Gilbert Scott. It was grade I listed in 1966.

The church is built of limestone with a Westmorland slate roof, and consists of a nave and chancel under one roof, north and south aisles, and a west tower. The tower has three stages, a moulded plinth, buttresses, two-light bell openings, gargoyles, and an embattled parapet. In the south aisle is the Norman doorway with an inner order of zigzag decoration, an outer order of beak-head decoration, and columns with cushion capitals. Inside are a 19th-century chancel screen and sedilia, and two 14th-century memorials with effigies of knights. Outside the church is a bowl-shaped stone, sometimes described as a font, but which may have Roman origins.

== See also ==
- Grade I listed buildings in North Yorkshire (district)
- Listed buildings in Goldsborough, Harrogate
