= Wilfrid Prest =

Australian legal historian and academic (born 1940)

Wilfrid Prest AM FAHA FASSA
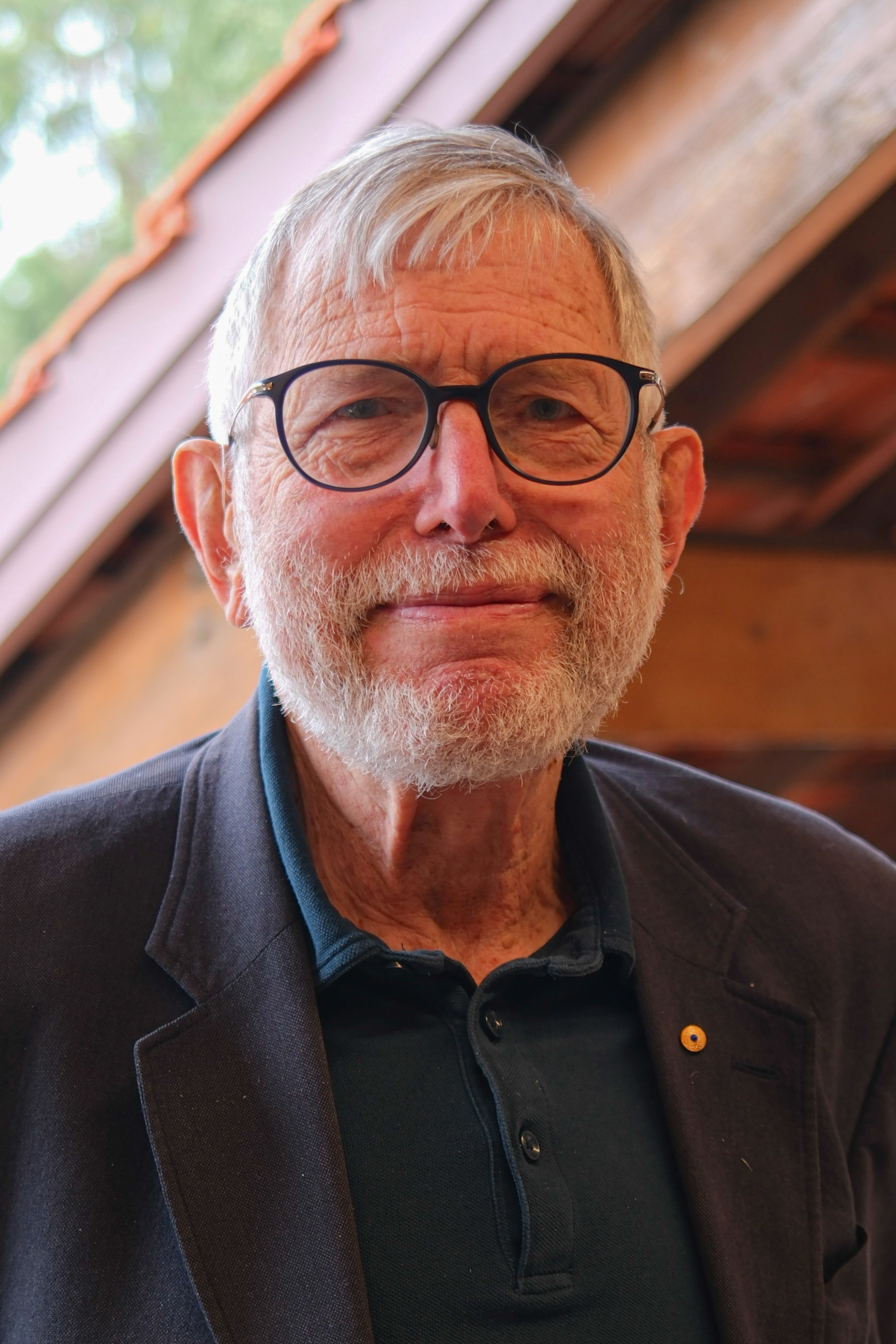
- Prest at Adelaide University in 2026
- Born: 1940 (age 85–86); Melbourne, Australia

Academic background
- Education: University of Melbourne (BA); University of Oxford (DPhil)

Wilfrid Prest, AM (born 1940) is an Australian legal historian who is professor emeritus at the University of Adelaide. He is also a Fellow of the Royal Historical Society, the Australian Academy of the Humanities, the Academy of the Social Sciences in Australia, and Queen's College, University of Melbourne, and a member of the Council of the Selden Society, London.

He has published five sole-author books, three scholarly textual editions, and twelve edited collections, together with numerous journal articles and entries in works of reference.

== Life ==
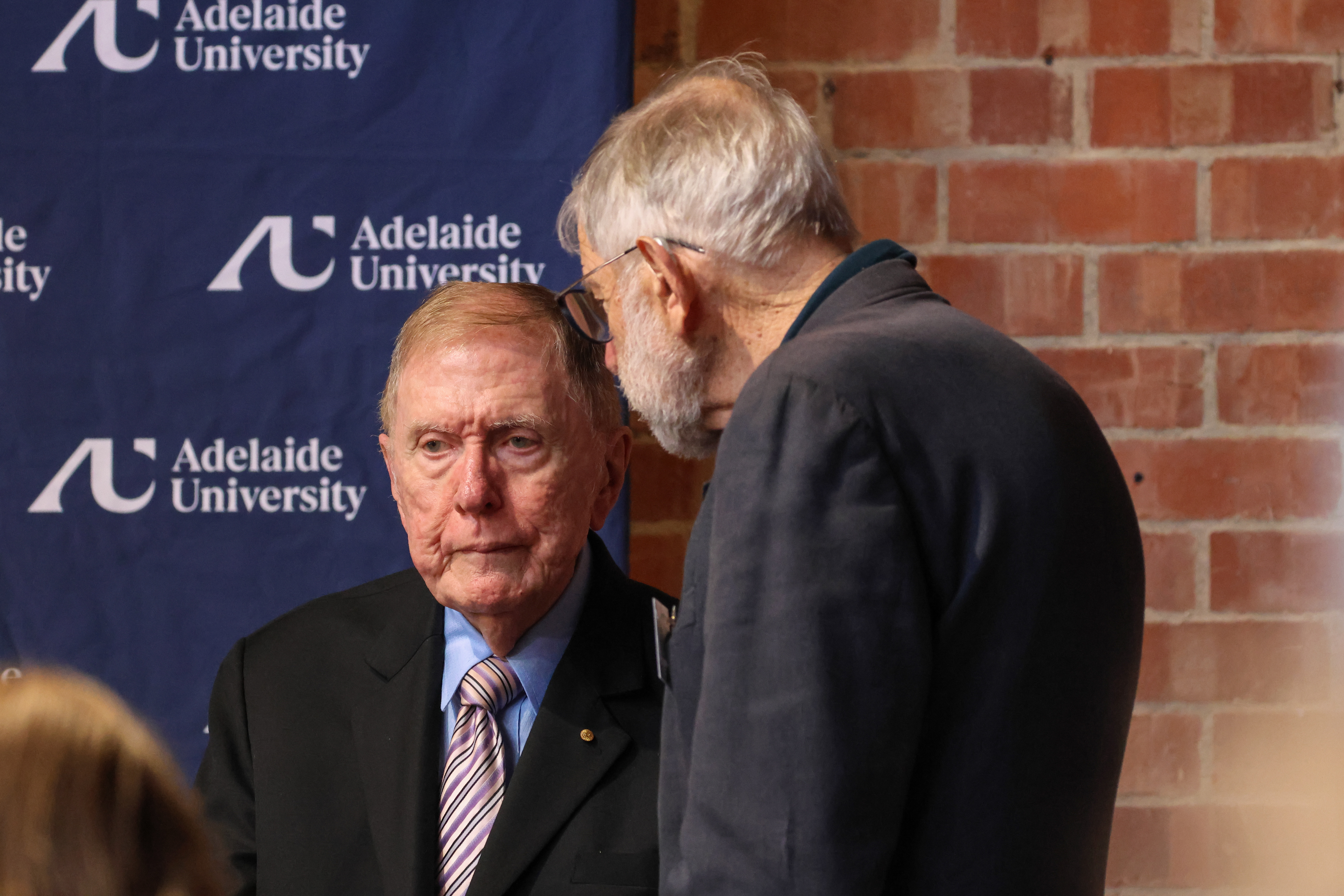
Michael Kirby and Prest at the Union House of Adelaide University in 2026

Born in Melbourne, Australia, of English parents and educated at schools in Melbourne, York and Cambridge, Prest read history at the University of Melbourne, then studied as a Rhodes Scholar (Victoria and New College, 1962) for his doctorate at the University of Oxford. After six months as a publishing trainee in London, he became a lecturer in history at the University of Adelaide in 1966. He subsequently spent two years (1969–71) as assistant professor at The Johns Hopkins University, in Baltimore, before returning to the University of Adelaide, where he remained a member of the history department until July 2002. Between 1978 and 1985, he was also chairman of the Board of the Art Gallery of South Australia.

In 2002 Prest resigned his personal chair in History to take up an Australian Research Council Australian Professorial Fellowship; he moved to the Law School in 2003, and subsequently held his fellowship as a joint appointment between Law and History, while preparing a biography of William Blackstone. From 2010 to 2015, he oversaw as general editor the preparation of a new variorum edition of Blackstone's Commentaries on the Laws of England, first published in four volumes from 1765 to 1769. He is currently working on volume nine (1689–1760) of the Oxford History of the Laws of England with his Adelaide colleague David Lemmings and Mike Macnair of the Faculty of Law, University of Oxford.

In the 2021 Australia Day Honours list, Prest was awarded Member (AM) in the General Division for significant service to tertiary education and to the law and legal history.

== Published works ==
=== Books ===
==== Monographs ====
- The Inns of Court under Elizabeth I and the Early Stuarts, 1590–1640 (London: Longman; Totowa NJ: Rowman and Littlefield, 1972)
- The Rise of the Barristers: A Social History of the English Bar 1590–1640 (Oxford: Clarendon Press, 1986, 1991)
- Albion Ascendant: English History 1660–1815 (London: Oxford University Press, 1998)
- William Blackstone: Law and Letters in the Eighteenth Century (Oxford: Oxford University Press, 2008, 2012)
- Blackstone as a Barrister (London: Selden Society, 2010)

==== Edited texts ====
- The Diary of Sir Richard Hutton, Justice of Common Pleas 1617–1639, with Related Documents (London: Selden Society, 1991)
- The Letters of Sir William Blackstone, 1743–1780 (London: Selden Society, 2006)
- (with David Lemmings, Simon Stern, Thomas Gallanis and Ruth Paley), The Oxford Blackstone; a variorum edition of William Blackstone, Commentaries on the Laws of England, 4 vols (Oxford: Oxford University Press, 2016)

==== Edited collections ====
- Lawyers in Early Modern Europe and America (London: Croom Helm, 1981; New York: Holmes and Meier, 1981)
- The Professions in Early Modern England (London: Croom Helm, 1987)
- John Bray: Law, Letters, Life (Adelaide: Wakefield Press, 1997)
- British Studies into the 21st Century: Perspectives and Practices (Melbourne: Australian Scholarly Publishing, 1999)
- (with Graham Tulloch) Scatterlings of Empire (St Lucia: Queensland University Press, 2001) (Journal of Australian Studies, no. 68)
- (with Kerrie Round and Carol Susan Fort), The Wakefield Companion to South Australian History (Adelaide: Wakefield Press, 2001)
- (with Sharyn Roach-Anleu) Litigation Past and Present (Kensington, NSW: University of New South Wales Press, 2003)
- Blackstone and his Commentaries: Biography, History and Law (Oxford: Hart Publishing, 2009)
- (with Graeme Davison and Pat Jalland) Body and Mind: Historical Essays in Honour of F. B. Smith (Melbourne: Melbourne University Press, 2009)
- Pasts Present: History at Australia's Third University (Adelaide: Wakefield Press, 2014)
- Re-interpreting Blackstone's Commentaries: A Seminal Text in National and International Contexts (Oxford: Hart Publishing, 2014)
- (with Anthony Page), Blackstone and his Critics (Oxford: Hart Publishing, 2018)

=== Articles ===
==== Contributions to edited volumes ====
- "Why the history of professions is not written", in G. Rubin and David Sugarman (eds), Law, Economy and Society 1750–1914: Essays in the History of English Law (Oxford: Professional Books Ltd, 1984)
- "The experience of litigation in eighteenth-century England", in D. Lemmings (ed.), The British and their Laws in the Eighteenth Century (Woodbridge: Boydell and Brewer, 2005), pp. 133–54
- "Legal autobiography in early modern England", in R. Bedford, L. Davies and P. Kelly (eds), Early Modern Autobiography: Theories, Genres, Practices (Ann Arbor: University of Michigan Press, 2006), pp. 280–94
- "New frontiers of legal history", in J. Gleeson and R. Higgins (eds.), Constituting Law: Legal Argument and Social Values (Australia: Federation Press, 2011), pp. 78–88
- "Conflict, change and continuity: Elizabeth I to the Great Temple Fire", in R. O. Havery (ed.), History of the Middle Temple (Oxford: Hart Publishing, 2011), pp. 81–110
- "The unreformed Middle Temple", in R. O. Havery (ed.), History of the Middle Temple (Oxford: Hart Publishing, 2011), pp. 205–237
- "Readers' dinners and the culture of the early modern Inns of Court", in J. Archer, E. Goldring, and S. Knight (eds.), The Intellectual and Cultural World of the Early Modern Inns of Court (Manchester: Manchester University Press, 2011), pp. 107–123
- "Lay legal history", in A. Musson and C. Stebbings (eds) Making Legal History: Approaches and Methodologies (Cambridge: Cambridge University Press, 2012), pp. 196–214
- "'That good fellow Sugden on the side of tolerance': Marshall-Hall and the Master of Queen's", in T. Radic and S. Robisnson (eds.), Marshall-Hall's Melbourne: Music, Art and Controversy 1891-1915 (Australia: Australia Scholarly Publishing, 2012), pp. 75–88
- "William Blackstone and the 'free Constitution of Britain'", in D. Gallgan (ed.), Constitutions and the Classics: Patterns of Constitutional Thought from Fortescue to Bentham (Oxford: Oxford University Press, 2014), pp. 210–230
- "Blackstone's Commentaries: modernisation and the British diaspora", in P. Payton (ed.), Emigrants & Historians: essays in honour of Eric Richards (Wakefield Press: Adelaide, 2016), pp. 77–97.
- "William Blackstone's Anglicanism", in M. Hill and R. H. Helmholz (eds), Great Jurists in English History (Cambridge: Cambridge University Press, 2017), pp. 213–235.

==== Entries in the Oxford Dictionary of National Biography ====
- Archer, Sir John (1598–1682), judge
- Ball, Sir Peter (bap. 1598, d. 1680), lawyer and antiquary
- Blackstone, Sir William (1723–1780), legal writer and judge
- Bulstrode, Edward (c.1588–1659), judge
- Cook, John (bap. 1608, d. 1660), judge and regicide
- Crewe [Crew], Sir Randolph (bap. 1559, d. 1646), judge
- Denham, Sir John (1559–1639), judge
- Finch, Sir Henry (c.1558–1625), author and lawyer
- Foster, Sir Thomas (1548–1612), judge
- Greene, John (1578–1653), sergeant-at-law
- Harvey, Sir Francis (c.1568–1632), judge and politician
- Hitcham, Sir Robert (bap. 1573, d. 1636), barrister and politician
- Hoskins, John (1566–1638), poet and judge
- Hutton, Sir Richard (bap. 1561, d. 1639), judge
- Hyde, Sir Nicholas (c.1572–1631), barrister and politician
- Hyde, Sir Robert (1595/6–1665), barrister and politician
- Ley, James, first earl of Marlborough (1550–1629), judge and politician
- Malet, Sir Thomas (c.1582–1665), judge and politician
- Moore, Sir Francis (1559–1621), lawyer and politician
- Nicolls, Sir Augustine (1559–1616), judge
- Pagitt, Justinian (1611/12–1668), lawyer and diarist
- Rokeby, Ralph (c.1527–1596), lawyer and administrator
- Walter, Sir John (bap. 1565, d. 1630), judge and politician
- Warburton, Sir Peter (c.1540–1621), judge
- Wilde, Sir William, first baronet (c.1611–1679), judge and politician
- Winch, Sir Humphrey (1554/5–1625), judge

=== Journal articles ===
- "Legal education of the gentry at the Inns of Court, 1560–1640", Past & Present, 38 (1967): 20–39
- "Stability and change in Old and New England: Clayworth and Dedham", Journal of Interdisciplinary History, 6 (1976): 359–374
- "The dialectical origins of Finch's Law", Cambridge Law Journal, 36 (1977): 326–352
- "Judicial corruption in early modern England", Past & Present, 133 (1991): 67–95
- "Predicting Civil War allegiances: the lawyers' case considered", Albion: A Quarterly Journal Concerned with British Studies, 24 (1992): 225–236
- "'One Hawkins, a female sollicitor': women lawyers in Augustan England", The Huntington Library Quarterly, 57 (1994): 353–358
- "William Lambarde, Elizabethan law reform, and early Stuart politics", The Journal of British Studies, 34 (1995): 464–480
- "'To die in the term": the mortality of English barristers", Journal of Interdisciplinary History, 26 (1995): 233–249
- "Blackstone as architect: constructing the Commentaries", Yale Journal of Law and the Humanities, 15 (2003): 103–133
- "Antipodean Blackstone: the Commentaries 'down under'", Flinders University Journal of Law Reform, 6 (2003): 151–167
- "The religion of a common lawyer? William Blackstone's Anglicanism", Parergon, 23 (2004): 153–68
- "Reconstructing the Blackstone archive: or, blundering after Blackstone", Archives, 31 (2006): 108–118
- "Law for historians: William Blackstone on wives, colonies and slaves", Legal History, 11:1 (2007): 105-115
- "History and biography, legal and otherwise", Adelaide Law Review, 32:2 (2011): 185-203
- "Blackstone and bibliography: in memoriam Morris Cohen", Law Library Journal, 104:1 (2012): 99-113
- "Blackstone as historian", Parergon, 32:3 (2015): 183-203
- "Blackstone's Magna Carta", North Carolina Law Review, 94 (2015–16): 1495-1519
- "Clio and I", History Australia, 13:1 (2016) :160-169
