= Claro Wapentake =

Former administrative area of Yorkshire, England

Coordinates: 54.016°N 1.350°W

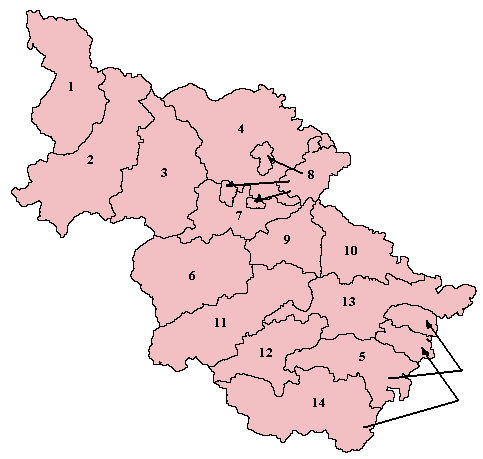
Wapentakes of the West Riding. The Upper Division labelled 8 on the map, and the Lower Division is labelled 4.

Claro was a wapentake of the West Riding of Yorkshire, England. It was split into two divisions. The Upper Division included the parishes of Farnham, Fewston, Hampsthwaite, Kirkby Malzeard and Pannal and parts of Aldborough, Knaresborough, Otley, Little Ouseburn, Ripley, Ripon, Wetherby and Whixley, many of which formed exclaves. The Lower Division included the parishes of Allerton Mauleverer, Goldsborough, Hunsingore, Kirk Deighton, Kirkby Overblow, Leathley, Spofforth with Stockeld, Weston and parts of Addingham, Aldborough, Harewood, Ilkley, Kirk Hammerton, Otley, Ripley and Whixley.

At the time of the Domesday Book the wapentake was known as Burghshire, named from its meeting place at Aldborough. In the 12th century the name was changed to Claro, from Claro Hill near Coneythorpe, presumably its meeting place.

Claro wapentake is exceptional because it is one of the few hundreds or wapentakes to have divisions with exclaves. The historic reasons for this situation are obscure but are likely based on patterns of settlement and transportation.

The area of the wapentake falls almost entirely within the former district of Harrogate in North Yorkshire.

Claro Registration District, existed from 1 January 1947 until 1 April 1974, when it was absorbed by the North Yorkshire district.
