= St John the Baptist Church, Knaresborough =

Parish church Knaresborough, North Yorkshire, England

St John the Baptist, Knaresborough
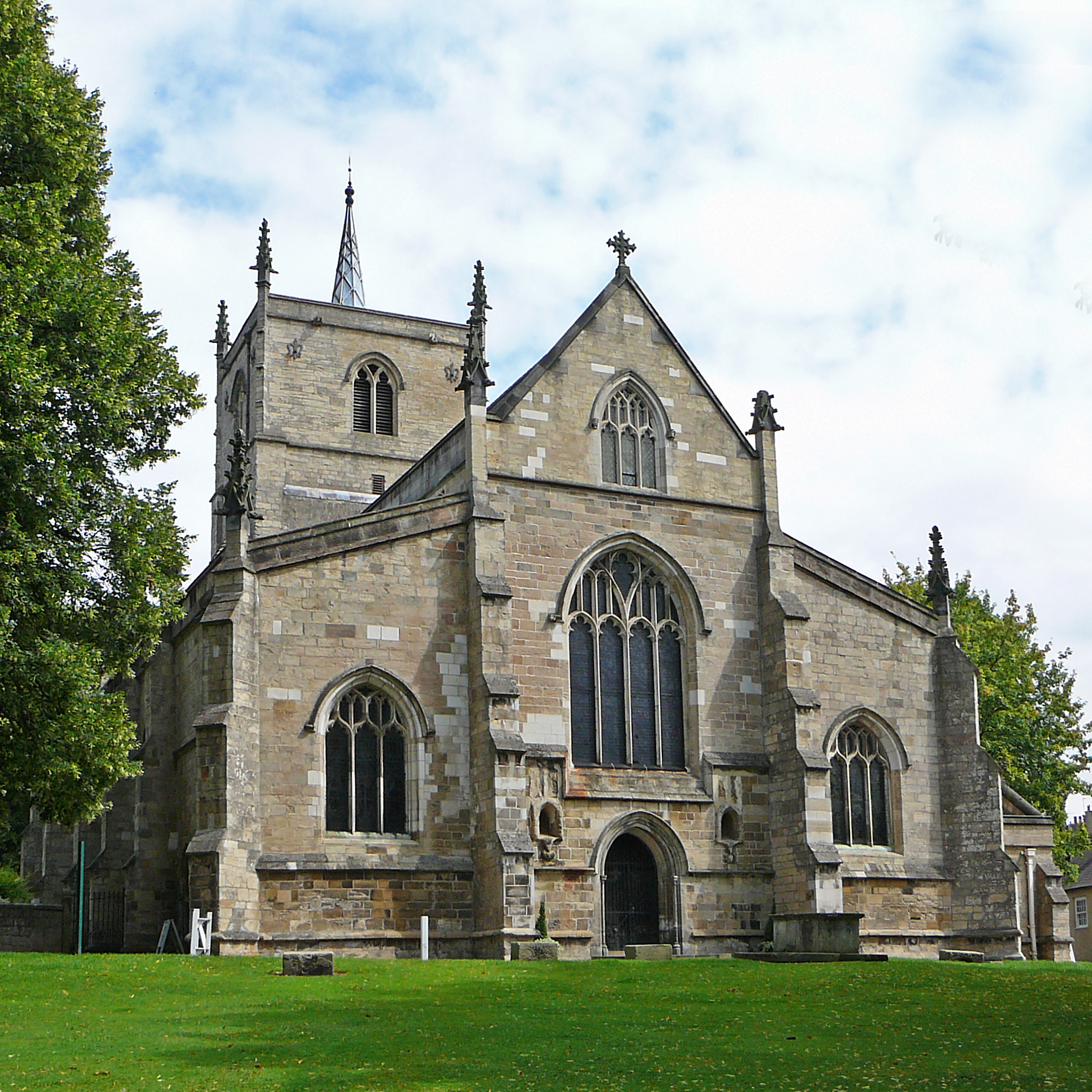
- St John the Baptist, Knaresborough
- St John the Baptist, Knaresborough
- 54.00951°N 1.47185°W
- Denomination: Church of England
- Churchmanship: Broad Church / Central
- Website: Knaresborough Anglican team website

History
- Dedication: St John

Administration
- Province: Province of York
- Diocese: Diocese of Leeds
- Archdeaconry: Archdeaconry of Richmond and Craven
- Parish: Knaresborough

Clergy
- Rector: The Revd Garry Hinchcliffe

St John the Baptist Church is a parish church in the Church of England located in Knaresborough, North Yorkshire. It is the largest church in the town.

== History ==
Records of a church on this site date back to at least 1114 when records from Nostell Priory, Wakefield show that King Henry I granted the "Church at Cnaresburgh" to the canons at Nostell. The church was originally dedicated to St Mary but was changed to its current name in the 16th century following reform after the English reformation. The bells were hung in 1774.

On 5 February 1952 the church was designated a grade I listed building.

=== Clock ===
The current clock was built by Potts of Leeds at a cost of £164 (equivalent to £17,600 in 2025) and set going in April 1884.

=== Present day ===
The church is located off Church Lane close to the North bank of the River Nidd. The church was the seat of the suffragan Bishop of Knaresborough.

The parish of Knaresborough is part of the Archdeaconry of Richmond and Craven in the Diocese of Leeds.

== See also ==
- Grade I listed buildings in North Yorkshire (district)
- Listed buildings in Knaresborough

== Gallery ==
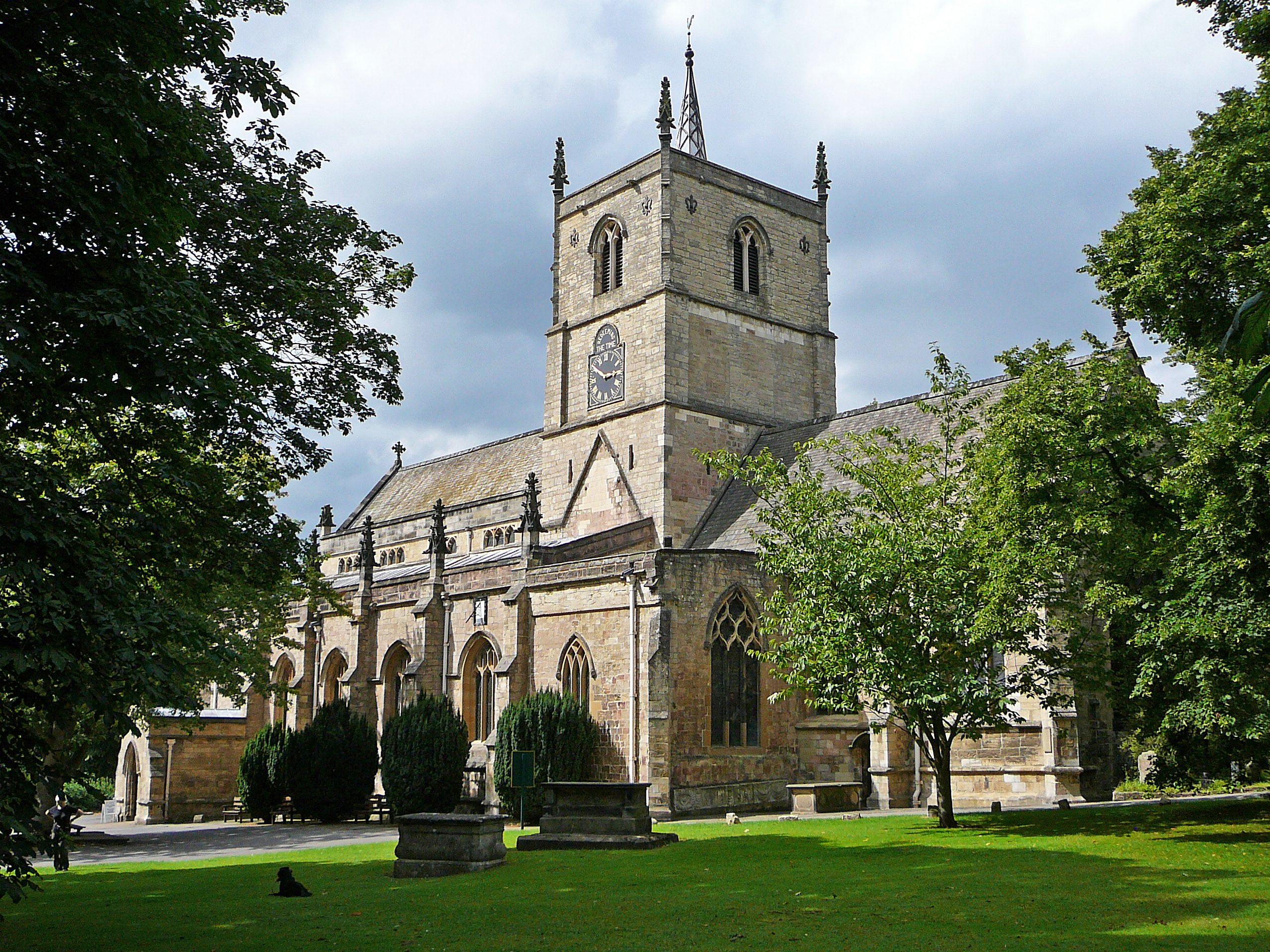
The tower

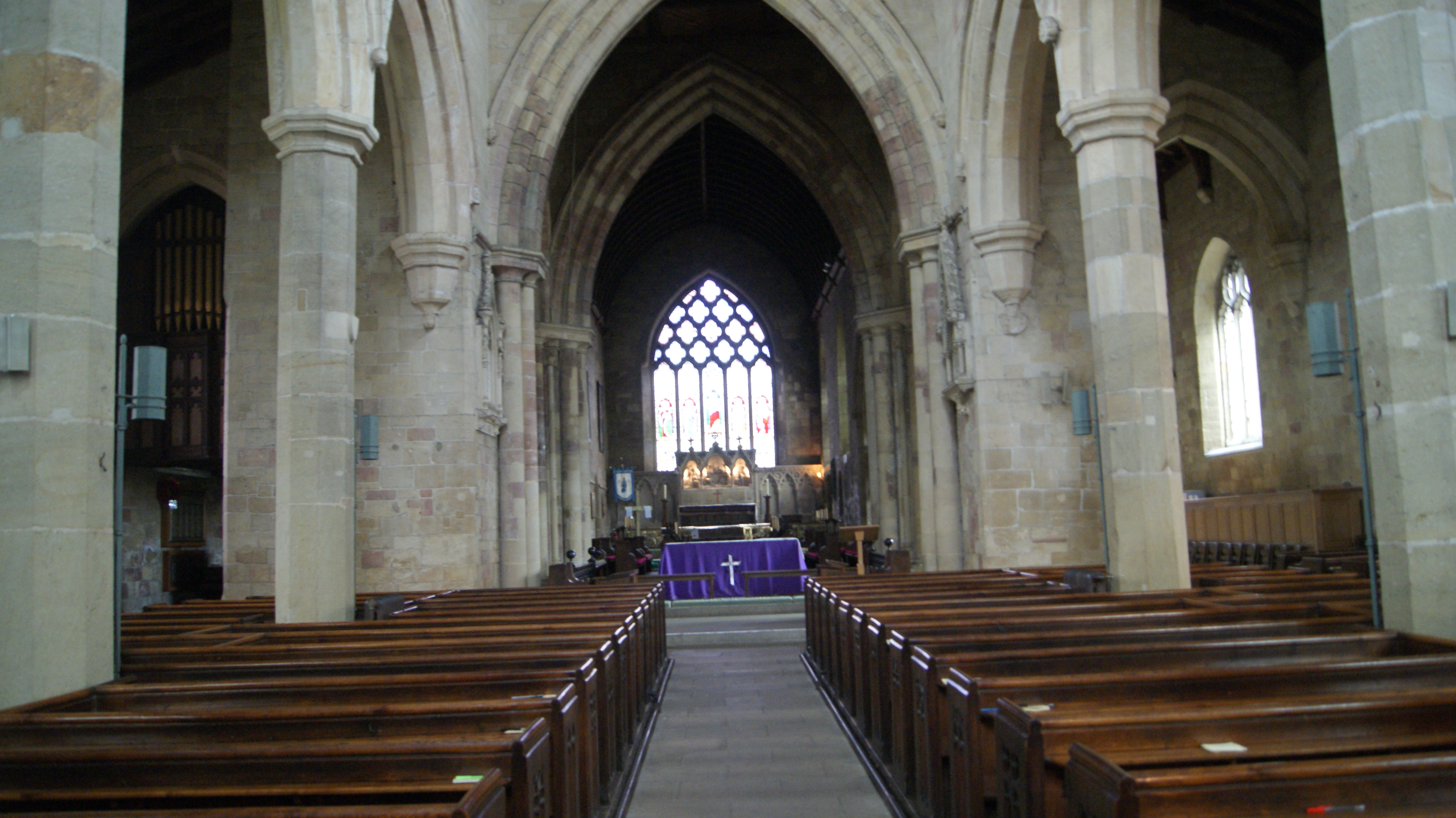
Nave

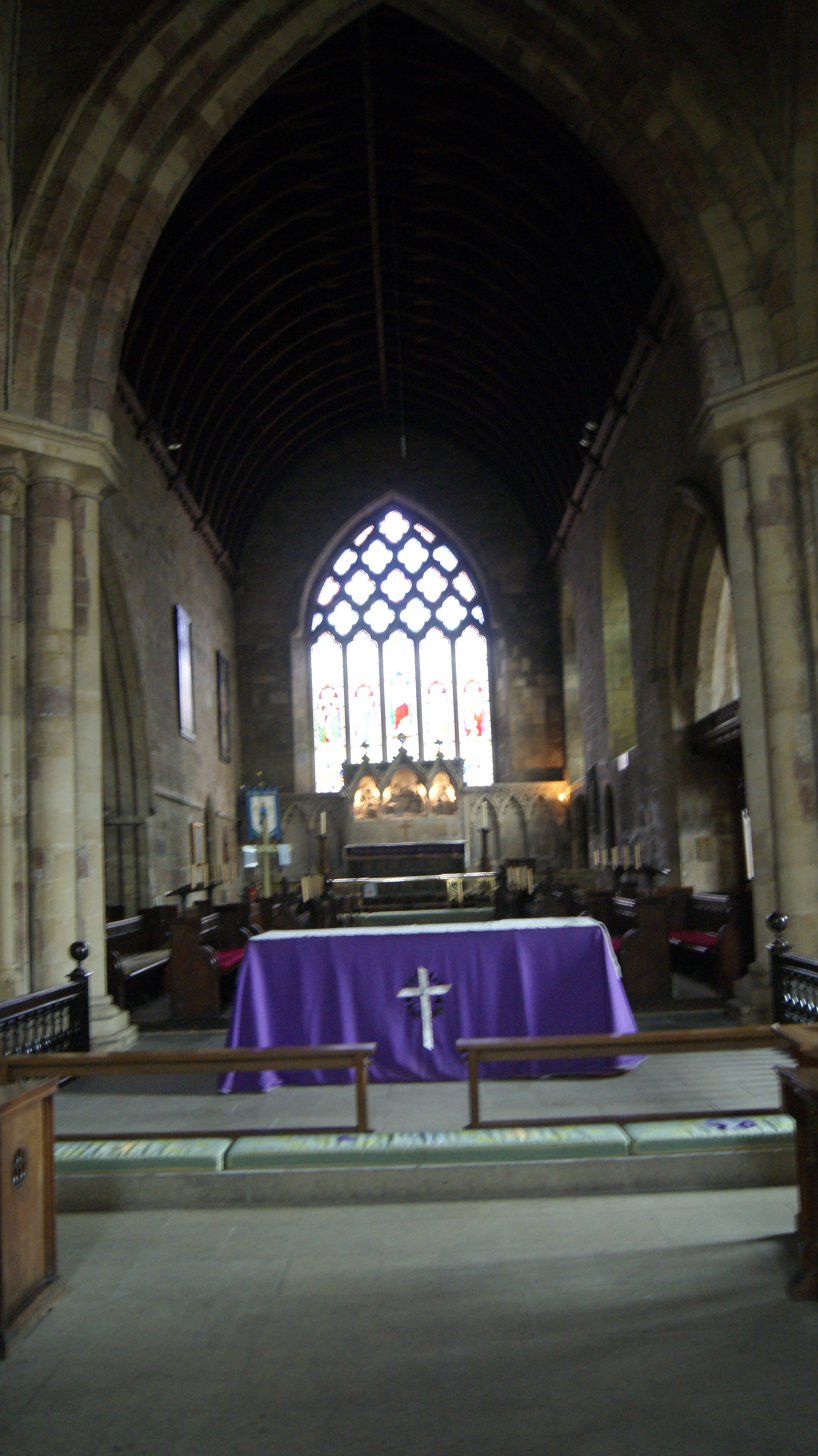
Chancel

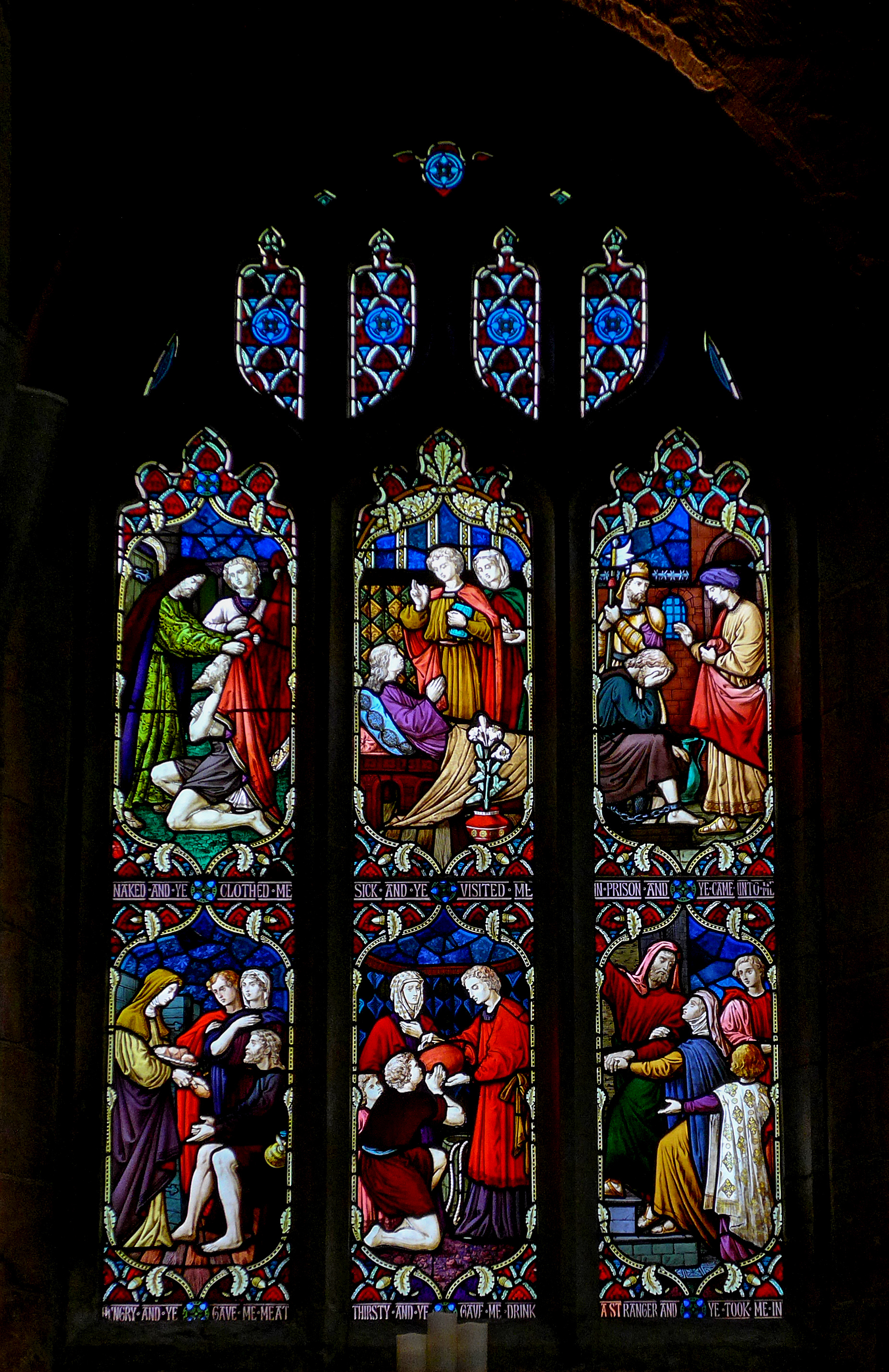
Stained glass window
