= William Tomkins =

English politician

William Tomkins was an English politician who sat in the House of Commons in 1628 and in 1640.

Tomkins was the son of James Tomkins of Monnington on Wye, Herefordshire, and of Garnestone south of Weobley.

Tomkins' father was instrumental in bringing back the franchise for Weobley and Tomkins became one of the first Members of Parliament returned for the borough in 1628. In April 1640, he was elected MP for Weobley in the Short Parliament.

Parliament of England
Borough re-enfranchised	Member of Parliament for Weobley; 1628–1629; With: William Walter	Parliament suspended until 1640
Parliament suspended since 1629	Member of Parliament for Weobley; 1640; With: Thomas Tomkins	Succeeded by Thomas Tomkins; Arthur Jones Lord Ranelagh
