= William Boyne =

Antiquarian and historian from Leeds (1814–1893)

- Born: 1814; Leeds, England
- Died: 1893 (aged 78–79); Leeds, England
- Occupation: Antiquarian
- Spouse: Ann Scott (d.1844)
- Writing career
- Notable work: History of Leeds

William Boyne (1814–18 November 1893) was a Leeds born antiquarian and historian best known for his 1877 illustrated work "The History of Leeds".

== Early life ==
Virginia Cottage is now Lyddon Hall on the University of Leeds campus. This photo is from 1947.

William was born to Mary and Thomas Boyne in a house in St Peter's Square in 1814. His father Thomas was a wealthy tobacco importer and moved his family in 1826 to a large house in Little Woodhouse that he named Virginia Cottage after the American state where the tobacco to which he owed his wealth was grown. Boyne was educated mostly at home other than 3 years at Leeds Grammar School and joined the family business in 1830. He married Ann Scott in 1842 and the couple lived in Queens Square, Leeds until Ann's premature death just 2 years later in 1844.

Boyne's antiquarian interest had been established at a young age and became more so after the death of his wife when he began to host antiquarian symposia at Queens Square. A member of this group, William Bowman, founded an antiquarian journal called Reliquiae Antiquae Eboracenses to which Boyne contributed articles. Boyne was an early member of the Leeds Philosophical and Literary Society as well as a lifelong member of the Thoresby Society.

Five years after the death of his wife in 1849 his father also died leaving William to inherit the family business. He used his inheritance to buy land in Headingley from the Earl of Cardigan and to build a large house that became known as 'The Woodlands'.

== Boyne's History of Leeds ==
Boyne spent much of his life compiling his seven volume History of Leeds which built upon the work of earlier historians, notably Ralph Thoresby's Ducatus Leodiensis, the first written history of Leeds published in 1715. As a 'grangerised' work, meaning that it augmented Thoresby's previous book with extra illustrations and material drawn from Boyne's own collections, the book is kept at Leeds Central Library. Specifically Boyne used clergyman and topographer Thomas Dunham Whitaker's 1816 edition as well as Whitaker's own work from 1816 entitled 'Leodis and Elmete' which together provided the basis for his own original material on Leeds. 'Leodis' is the historical term for Leeds.

Additional material added by Boyne includes 300 coats of arms, portraits of Leeds subjects by various artists and old maps of Leeds.

== Later life and death ==
In addition to The History of Leeds, Boyne is primarily known today as a numismatist who curated a collection of more than 30,000 coins and tokens. He sold the family business in 1853 due to poor health and 'conceived an unconquerable prejudice against Leeds'. In 1858 he moved to London where he continued to build his collection of coins and engravings. He never returned to Leeds, tavelling widely and living in South Africa, France, and Italy. He died in Florence in 1893.
