= Ely Hargrove =

English bookseller and historian (1741–1818)

Ely Hargrove (19 March 1741 – 5 December 1818) was an English bookseller and local historian.

== Life ==
Born at Halifax, Yorkshire, on 19 March (O.S.) 1741, he was the son of James Hargrove of Halifax, by his wife Mary, daughter of George Gudgeon of Skipton-in-Craven. In February 1762 he settled at Knaresborough, as a bookseller and publisher. A few years later he was able to open a branch business at Harrogate.

Hargrove died at Knaresborough on 5 December 1818, and was buried in the churchyard there.

== Works ==
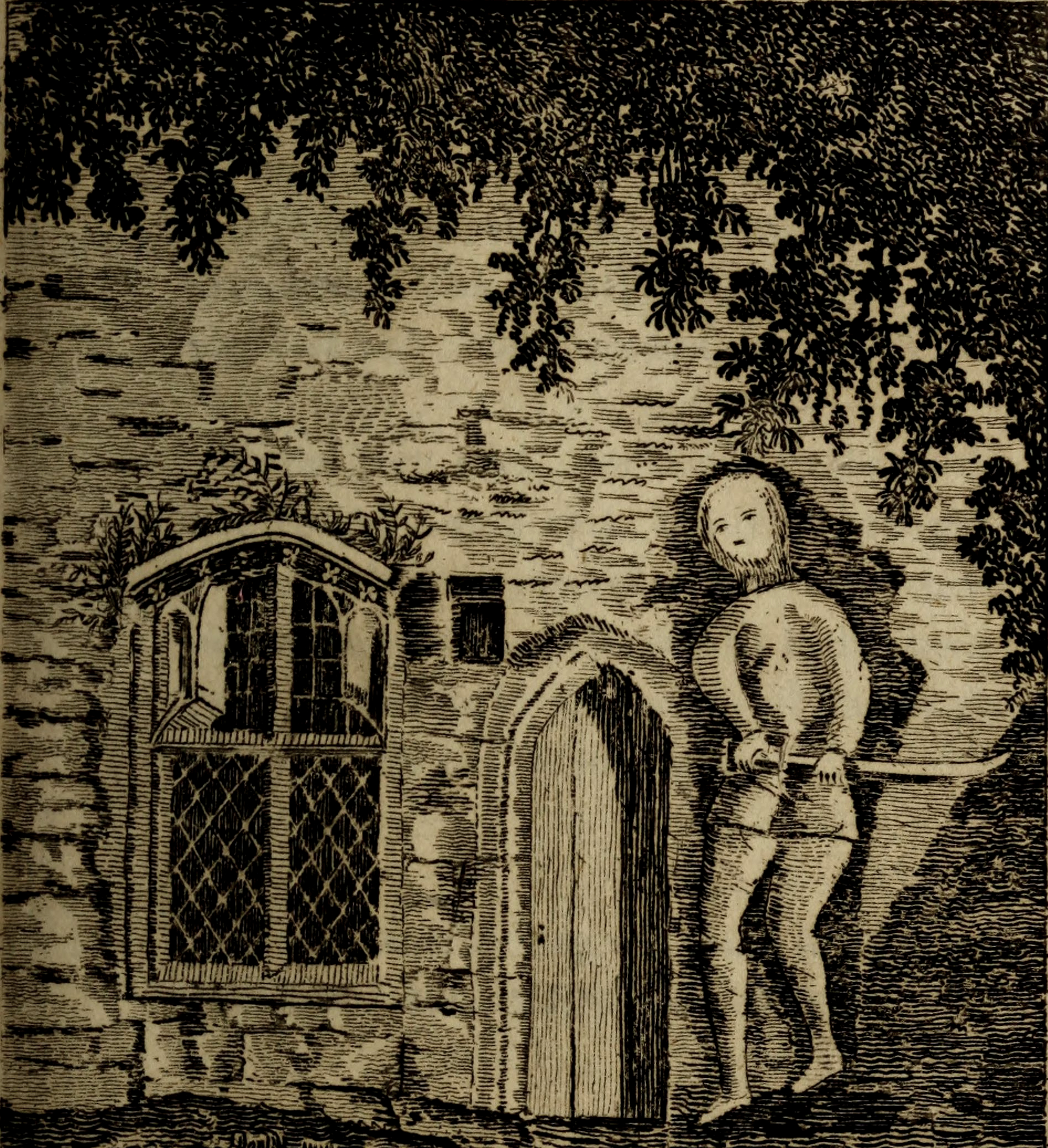
St Robert's Chapel, Knaresborough, engraving by Thomas Bewick from The History of the Castle, Town, and Forest of Knaresborough, with Harrogate (1809)

In 1769, according to William Boyne in the Yorkshire Library, there appeared anonymously the first edition of Hargrove's History of the Castle, Town, and Forest of Knaresborough, with Harrogate and its Medicinal Waters, which was frequently republished, later with the compiler's name on the title-page. The York edition of 1798 had plates and woodcuts by Thomas Bewick. To the sixth edition, Knaresborough, 1809, was appended an Ode on Time, reprinted in William Hargrove's York Poetical Miscellany (1835).

Hargrove also compiled:

- Anecdotes of Archery from the earliest ages to the year 1791 . . . with some curious particulars in the Life of Robert Fitz-Ooth, Earl of Huntingdon, vulgarly called Robin Hood, York, 1792 (another edition, by Alfred E. Hargrove, York 1845).
- The Yorkshire Gazetteer, or a Dictionary of the Towns, Villages, and Hamlets, Monasteries and Castles, principal Mountains, Rivers, &c., in the county of York and Ainsty, Knaresborough, 1806; second edition, 1812.

Under the signature of "E. H. K.", Hargrove contributed papers to the Gentleman's Magazine, and wrote an account of Boroughbridge to the fifth volume of Rees's Cyclopædia. His manuscript collections on Yorkshire history filled sixteen volumes.

== Family ==
Hargrove married, first, Christiana (d. 1780), daughter of Thomas Clapham of Firby, near Bedale, Yorkshire, by whom he had issue twelve children; and secondly, Mary, daughter of John Bower of Grenoside Hall, near Sheffield; she died at York in April 1825, and was buried at Knaresborough, leaving a son, William Hargrove.
