= Richard Hutton (judge) =

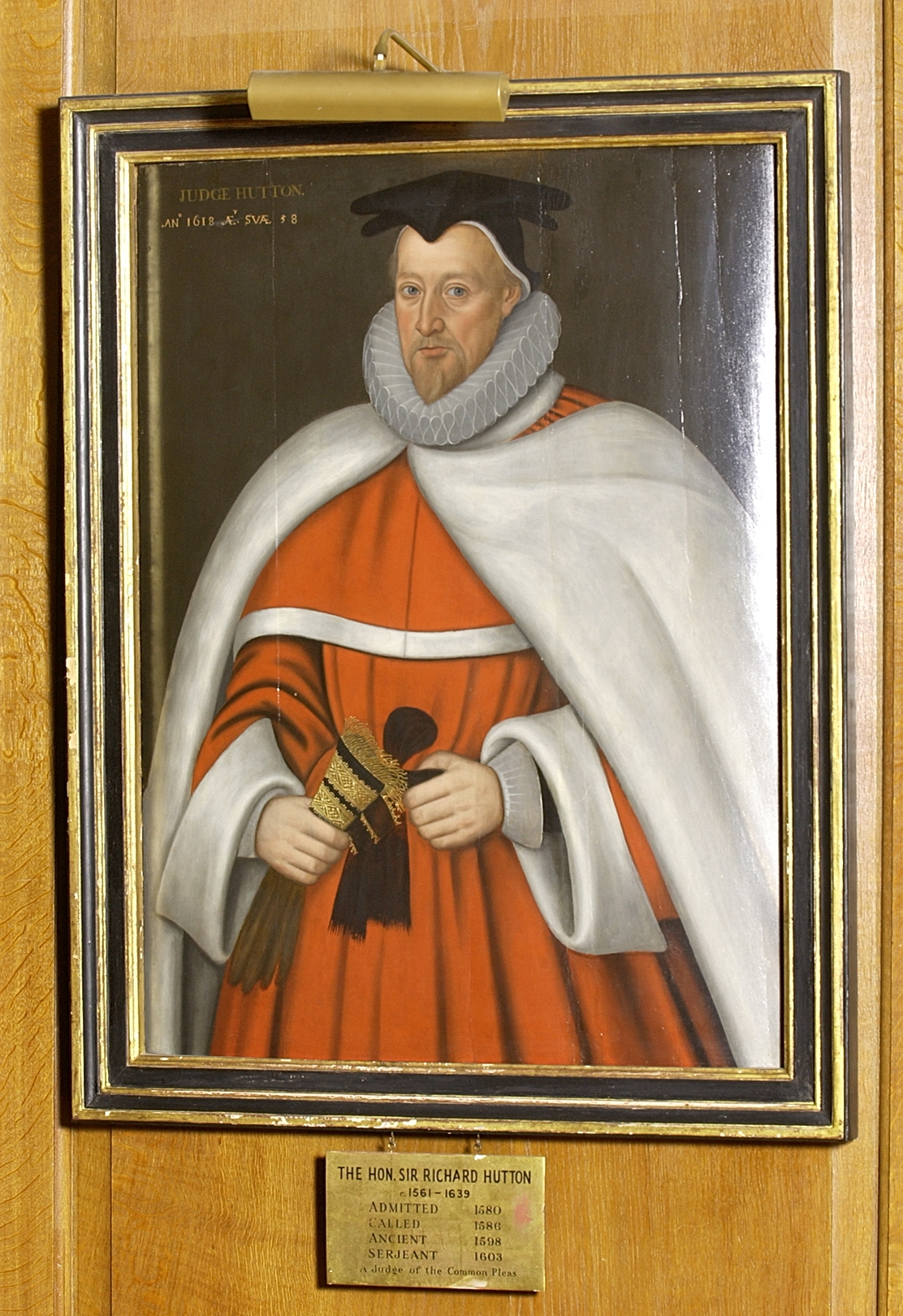
Sir Richard Hutton, A Judge of the Common Pleas

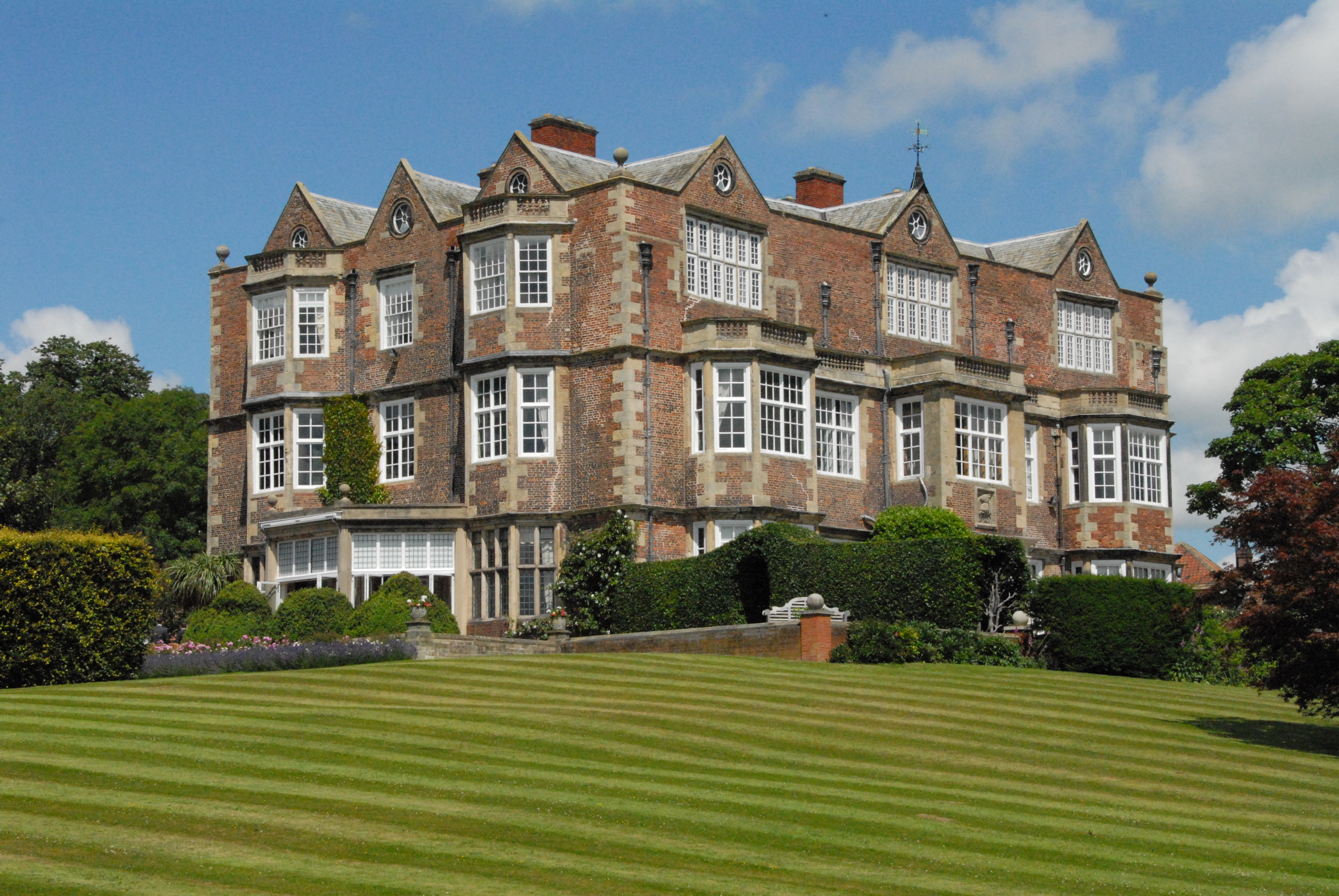
Goldsborough Hall

Sir Richard Hutton (1560 – 26 February 1639) was a Yorkshire landowner, and judge. He defied Charles I over ship money.

== Life ==
Hutton was born and brought up at Hutton Hall in Penrith, Cumberland, the son of Anthony Hutton. He went to Jesus College, Cambridge, to study divinity but aged 20 headed to London to pursue a career in law. He was called to the bar in 1586 and was made a serjeant-at-law in 1603 under Elizabeth I. At this time, Hutton bought the estate at Goldsborough, near Knaresborough, West Riding of Yorkshire from the Goldsborough family, whose original thatched moated manor house had been destroyed after a quarrel over succession. Sir Richard Hutton bought out the claimants to the estate and built the present Goldsborough Hall to the south east of the village on raised ground close to the church.

Hutton was made Recorder of York in 1608, Doncaster in 1609 and Ripon in 1610. He held these offices until 1617 when he was knighted by King James I on a visit to York and made judge of the Court of Common Pleas (England). Hutton was well thought of under Charles I and became acting Chief Justice of the Common Pleas for a year from December 1625 to November 1626. He was a friend and relative of Matthew Hutton (Archbishop of York) (1529–1606).

=== Ship Money ===
All judges were asked to sign a declaration in favour of ship money, a disputed tax, in 1635. Hutton signed it but in 1638 ruled against the King in favour of John Hampden and admitted he was against the tax, saying that such a charge might not be imposed by the king's "original writ only under the great seal, without parliament,... unless in time of actual war and invasion". After the judgement, one of the High Church clergy, the Revd Thomas Harrison, accused Hutton of high treason. He was prosecuted, imprisoned and fined £5,000. There is an account of the trial in Hutton's Diary and he won £10,000 in damages.

Hutton died at Serjeant's Inn in 1639 and was buried, as requested, at St Dunstan-in-the-West, Fleet Street, London. Goldsborough Hall and his estates then passed to his son and heir, Sir Richard Hutton, the younger (knighted in 1625). Charles I called him "his honest judge".

Hutton kept a diary from 1614 until his death in 1639 which was edited by W R Prest.

== Family ==
Sir Richard married Agnes Briggs of Cawmire, Westmorland, in 1591, the daughter and heiress of Thomas Briggs of Cawmire. They had four sons and five daughters. His second son, Sir Richard Hutton the younger (1617–1645) succeeded him after the death of his eldest son, Christopher, aged 24, who died after a sea voyage. Hutton was the younger brother of Sir William Hutton.

== Books ==
- The Diary of Sir Richard Hutton 1614–1639, edited for the Selden Society by Wilfrid Prest, Reader in History, The University of Adelaide, London 1991
- The Legacy: The Huttons of Penrith and Beetham by Barbara C Lee, publ. Titus Wilson & Son, Kendal, ISBN 0-9531444-0-2 is a history of the Hutton family with extensive references to Sir Richard Hutton
- The History of the Castle, Town and Forest of Knaresborough with Harrogate and its Medicinal Waters by Ely Hargrove, printed by Hargrove and Sons, Knaresborough, 1809 gives a brief history of the Huttons of 'Goldesburgh', 'Goldesburgh Hall' and Church

== Articles ==
Ship Money and Mr Justice Hutton by Wilfrid Prest, published in History Today Volume: 41 Issue: 1 January 1991. Wilfrid Prest used Sir Richard Hutton's diaries to illustrate the attitudes and issues behind one of the constitutional set pieces of Charles I's reign
