= William Slingsby =

English soldier

Sir William Slingsby
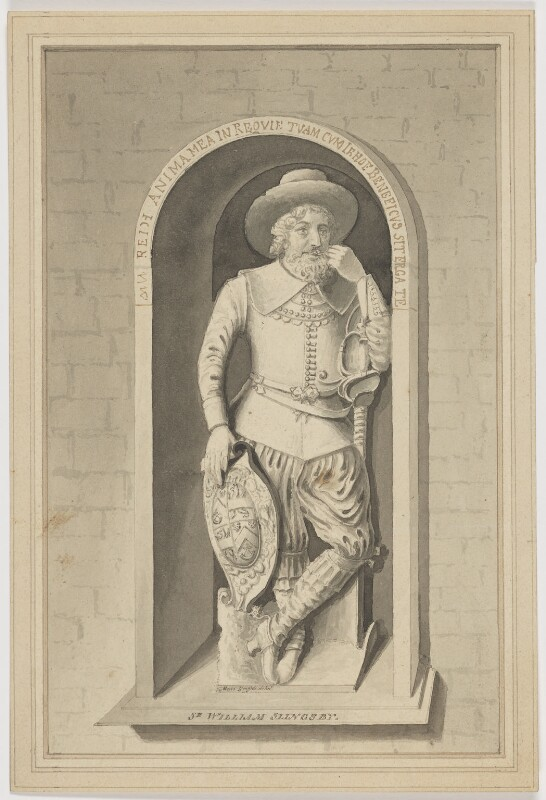

Sir William Slingsby (29 January 1563 – 1634) was an English soldier who is often erroneously noted as the discoverer of the first spa water well in Harrogate, North Yorkshire.

He was the seventh but third surviving son of Sir Francis Slingsby and Mary de Percy, daughter of Sir Thomas Percy, executed for his part in the Pilgrimage of Grace, and sister of Thomas Percy, 7th Earl of Northumberland, and Henry Percy, 8th Earl of Northumberland. The Percies were descendants of Saer de Quincy, 1st Earl of Winchester. He was born in Scriven, Knaresborough, West Riding. After marrying Elizabeth Broard, daughter of Sir Stephen Broad of Broadshill, Sussex, in 1582, the couple took a Grand Tour of Europe, returning in 1594. In 1596, Slingsby discovered that water from the Tewit Well mineral spring at Harrogate possessed properties similar to that from Spa, Belgium.

In 1596, Slingsby served as a soldier on the Cadiz expedition and again in 1597 against Spain.

He purchased the estate of Kippax, West Yorkshire, from Francis Bailden. In 1601, he was made the junior Member of Parliament for Knaresborough alongside his brother, Sir Henry Slingsby, serving until 1611. He was knighted in 1603. After retiring from soldiering, he was made Deputy Lieutenant for Middlesex in 1617. He was elected MP for Appleby in 1626.

He died in 1634, leaving a son, Henry, who became Master of the Mint, and a daughter. He was buried in Knaresborough church. He had several distinguished nephews, including Sir Henry Slingsby, 1st Baronet, Guildford Slingsby, and Sir Robert Slingsby, 1st Baronet.

His portrait by Moses Griffith hangs in the National Portrait Gallery.

Slingsby Place Street in Covent Garden is named after him.
