= Goldsborough, Harrogate =

Village and civil parish in North Yorkshire, England

Coordinates: 54°00′00″N 1°25′03″W

Goldsborough
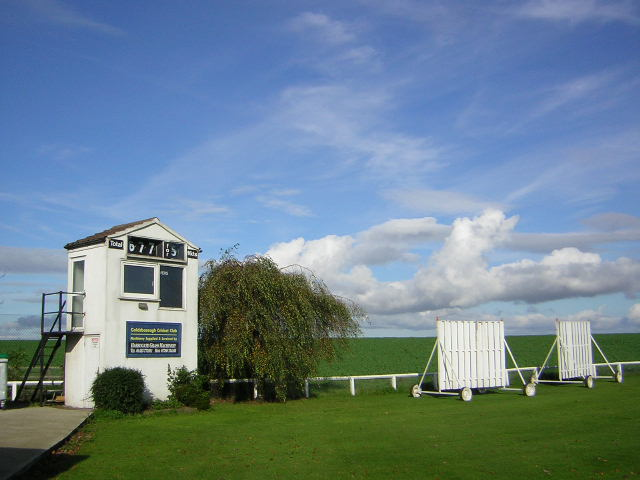
- The cricket pitch at Goldsborough

- Location within North Yorkshire
- Population: 469 (2011 Census)
- OS grid reference: SE384561
- Civil parish: Goldsborough
- Unitary authority: North Yorkshire
- Ceremonial county: North Yorkshire
- Region: Yorkshire and the Humber
- Country: England
- Sovereign state: United Kingdom
- Post town: KNARESBOROUGH
- Postcode district: HG5
- Dialling code: 01423
- Police: North Yorkshire
- Fire: North Yorkshire
- Ambulance: Yorkshire
- UK Parliament: Harrogate and Knaresborough

Goldsborough is a village and civil parish in North Yorkshire, England. It is situated near the River Nidd and one mile (1.6 km) east of Knaresborough. Goldsborough is recognised by the well-known stately home Goldsborough Hall and its other features including: Goldsborough Primary School, the Bay Horse Inn and the Goldsborough Cricket Grounds.

The village was historically part of the West Riding of Yorkshire until 1974. From 1974 to 2023 it was part of the Borough of Harrogate, it is now administered by the unitary North Yorkshire Council.

== History ==
The village appears in the Domesday Book as Golburg or Goldeburgh, which means Golda's Burgh (with Burgh meaning a fortified place). It was in the possession of the de Goldesburgh, Hutton and Byerley families at that time.

The village was the seat of the short-lived Wytham Baronetcy during the 1680s.

A Viking hoard was discovered in Goldsborough Village in 1859 during construction outside the north wall of Goldsborough Church. Coins and artefacts dating from 700 to 1050 were found in a leaden chest including fragments of Viking brooches and arm rings, together with 39 coins. It forms one of the largest collections ever discovered in the UK and is now held at the British Museum in London.

The village has a Church of England affiliated primary school which takes pupils from the surrounding settlements of Allerton, Coneythorpe, Hopperton and Flaxby.

Goldsborough was used by Yorkshire Television in the filming of The New Statesman.

Goldsborough used to have a railway station on the Harrogate to York railway line. The station was located 0.6 miles (1 km) north-east of the village. The site is where the current A59 passes over the railway line.

The village has one public house; The Bay Horse Inn which was built in the mid-late 18th century. Located at the junction of Church Street and Station Road, in front of the inn, the village war memorial commemorates victims of both world wars. it consists of an inscribed stone plinth surmounted by a cross.

In the 2001 Census, the population of the parish was 493, which had dropped to 469 by the time of the 2011 Census. In 2015, North Yorkshire County Council estimated that the population had dropped again to 460.

== Landmarks ==
=== Goldsborough Hall ===
Goldsborough Hall is a Grade II* listed building that was built c. 1625 for Richard Hutton. It was bought by Daniel Lascelles in 1760. It became the home of Princess Mary from her marriage to Henry Lascelles in 1922 until he became Earl of Harewood.

=== Church of St Mary ===
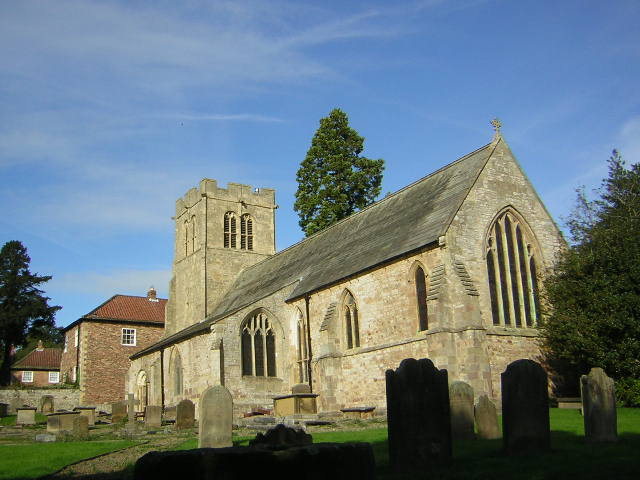
St. Mary's Church, Goldsborough

St Mary's Church, Goldsborough, is a Grade I listed medieval church. The oldest section of the building, the south Norman doorway, dates to the 12th century. Restoration work was carried out for the Byerley family in 1750, and in 1859 by George Gilbert Scott. In the church there are memorials to Richard de Goldsburgh (d.1308) and his son (d.1333), both are effigies of an armoured knight. There are also memorials to past residents of Goldsborough Hall; Robert Byerley and Daniel Lascelles.

The church was the setting for the baptism of George Henry Hubert Lascelles, first cousin of Queen Elizabeth II. The baptism was attended by his grandparents King George V and Queen Mary.

Within the churchyard there is a medieval cross base. This scheduled monument consists of a large cylindrical block of stone upon a square plinth. A small Viking enamelled strap end was found here c. 1910.
