= John Moore =

John Moore may refer to:

== Arts and entertainment ==
=== Art ===
- John Francis Moore (sculptor) (died 1809), 18th-century British sculptor
- John Moore of Ipswich, (1821–1902), English painter and decorator
- John Chandler Moore (1803–1874), American silversmith
- John Collingham Moore (1829–1880), English artist
- John Lysaght Moore (1897–1965), New Zealand artist
- John Mackenzie Moore (1857–1930), Canadian architect
- John Moore (painter) (born 1941), American artist
- John Moore (photographer) (born 1967), American photographer

=== Design ===
- John Moore (fashion designer) (1928–1996), American fashion designer

=== Film and theater ===
- John Moore (stage manager) (1814–1893), British actor, prompter, and stage manager
- John Moore (production designer) (1924–2006), American motion picture art director and production designer
- John Moore (broadcaster) (born 1966), Canadian broadcaster, actor, and voice actor
- John Moore (Australian actor) (born 1968), actor in Aboriginal roles
- John Moore (director) (born 1970), Irish film director, producer, and writer

=== Music ===
- Deacon John Moore (born 1941), American musician and bandleader
- John Moore (British musician) (born 1964), musician with The Jesus and Mary Chain, Black Box Recorder
- John Moore (songwriter) (born 1969), American songwriter and singer for 53 Days

=== Writing ===
- John Moore (Manx poet), privateer and poet from the late 18th Century
- John Moore (Scottish physician) (1729–1802), author of the 1789 novel Zeluco and father of General Sir John Moore
- John Weeks Moore (1807–1889), American editor of musical publications
- John Robert Moore (1890–1973), American literary critic and student of Daniel Defoe
- John Moore (British author) (1907–1967), British author and pioneer conservationist
- John Moore (American author) (born 1959)
- John Francis Moore (writer), American comic book writer
- John Trotwood Moore (1858–1929), American journalist, writer and local historian

== Clergy ==
- John Moore (1595?–1657), English clergyman; authored anti-enclosure pamphlets
- John Moore (bishop of Ely) (1646–1714), British scholar
- John Moore (Baptist) (1662–1726), English Baptist minister from Northampton
- John Moore (archbishop of Canterbury) (1730–1805), Archbishop of Canterbury
- John Moore (biblical scholar) (1742–1821), English biblical scholar
- John Moore (bishop of St. Augustine) (1835–1901), Bishop of St. Augustine, Florida, 1877–1901
- John Moore (Methodist bishop) (1867–1948), Bishop of the Methodist Episcopal Church, South
- John Moore (bishop of Bauchi) (1942–2010), Bishop of Bauchi, Nigeria
- John Jamison Moore (1818–1893), American preacher and educator
- John Moore (archdeacon of Cloyne), Archdeacon of Cloyne, 1665–1687

== Law and politics ==
=== Australia ===
- John Moore (Australian judge) (1915–1998), President of the Australian Conciliation and Arbitration Commission
- John Moore (Australian politician) (1936–2025), Australian defence minister under John Howard

=== Canada ===
- John Moore (Lower Canada politician) (died 1858), contractor and political figure in Lower Canada
- John Francis Moore (politician) (1816–1870), Canadian politician
- John Douglas Moore (1843–1917), Ontario farmer and political figure
- John Thomas Moore (1844–1917), member of the Legislative Assembly of Alberta, 1905–1909
- John Clarke Moore (1872–1943), Conservative member of the Canadian House of Commons

=== U.K. ===
- John Moore (MP for Dover) (fl. 1584–1586)
- John Moore (regicide) (1599–1650), regicide of King Charles I of England
- John Moore (Lord Mayor) (1620–1702), English politician, MP for the City of London, 1685–1687
- John Moore, 1st Baron Moore (died 1725), Irish politician
- John Moore (1756–1834), MP who represented the constituency of Newry
- John Moore (Irish politician) (1767–1799), President of the province of Connacht, Irish Republic
- John Voce Moore (1826–1904), Lord Mayor of London, 1898–1899
- John Moore (civil servant) (1921–2016), British civil servant
- John Moore, Baron Moore of Lower Marsh (1937–2019), British Cabinet minister under Margaret Thatcher

=== U.S. ===
- John Moore (Louisiana politician) (1788–1867), U.S. Congressman from Louisiana
- John Moore (Illinois politician) (1793–1863), Lieutenant Governor of Illinois
- John C. Moore (American politician) (1832–1915)
- John W. Moore (Missouri politician) (1840–1917), mayor of Kansas City, Missouri
- John P. Moore (Maryland politician) (1856–1918), member of the Maryland Senate, mayor of Snow Hill, Maryland
- John Isaac Moore (1856–1937), acting governor of Arkansas, 1907
- John Bassett Moore (1860–1947), international jurist
- John Marks Moore (1853–1902), Secretary of State of Texas, 1887–1891
- John Matthew Moore (1862–1940), U.S. Congressman from Texas
- John William Moore (1877–1941), U.S. Congressman from Kentucky
- John Moore Allison (1905–1978), Ambassador to Japan, Czechoslovakia and Indonesia
- John D. J. Moore (1910–1988), Ambassador to Ireland, 1969–1975
- John J. Moore (1920–1976), New York state senator
- John H. Moore II (1927–2013), federal judge
- John E. Moore (politician) (born 1943), Lieutenant Governor of Kansas
- John Moore (Mississippi politician) (born 1954), member of the Mississippi House of Representatives
- John Moore (Nevada politician) (born 1964), member of the Nevada Assembly

== Military ==
- Sir John Moore, 1st Baronet (1718–1779), Royal Navy officer
- Sir John Moore (1761–1809), British Army officer and politician
- John Henry Moore (Texas settler) (1800–1880), settler and officer in the Texas Revolution of 1835–1836
- John Creed Moore (1824–1910), U.S. Army officer, Confederate brigadier general
- John Moore (physician) (1826–1907), U.S. Army surgeon-general
- John Warren Moore (1827–1879), Confederate officer, sheriff and farmer from Mobile, Alabama
- John White Moore (1832–1913), U.S. Naval officer
- John Anderson Moore (1910–1944), U.S. Naval officer
- John Moore (Royal Navy officer) (1921–2010), British Royal Navy submariner and editor of Jane's Fighting Ships
- Joseph Michael John Moore (died 1975), British flying ace

== Science ==
- John Howard Moore (1862–1916), American zoologist, philosopher, educator, and social reformer
- John Percy Moore (1869–1965), American zoologist
- John Alexander Moore (1915–2002), American biologist
- John Fitzallen Moore (1928–2018), American physicist, son of authors Virginia Moore and Louis Untermeyer
- John B. Moore (engineer) (1941–2013), Australian electrical engineer
- John P. Moore, American virologist
- John Wilson Moore (1920–2019), American biophysicist
- John Edmund Sharrock Moore (1870–1947), English biologist

== Sports ==
=== Association football ===
- Jack Moore (sportsman) (1911–?), English footballer, referee and tennis player
- John Moore (footballer, born 1923) (1923–2012), English footballer
- John Moore (footballer, born February 1943) (1943–2009), English footballer
- John Moore (footballer, born December 1943), Scottish footballer and manager
- John Moore (footballer, born 1945), English footballer
- Jon Moore (born 1955), Welsh footballer
- John Moore (footballer, born 1966), English-born Hong Kong international footballer

=== Other sports ===
- John Moore (cricketer, born 1891) (1891–1980), Hampshire cricketer
- John Moore (baseball), American baseball player of the 1920s
- John Moore (rugby league) (died 1942), footballer of the 1930s and 1940s for England and Bradford Northern
- John Moore (basketball) (1933–1987), American basketball player
- John Doxie Moore (1911–1986), American basketball player, coach and executive
- John Moore (skier) (1933–2017), British Olympic skier
- John Moore (cricketer, born 1943) (1943–2004), English cricketer
- John Moore (referee) (born 1949), Irish hurling referee
- John Moore (horseman) (born 1950), Australian racehorse trainer
- John Moore (rower) (born 1964), American Olympic rower
- John Moore (ice hockey) (born 1990), American ice hockey defenseman

== Other people ==
- John Bradford Moore (1855–1926), American trader, pioneer in the Navajo rug trade
- John Coleman Moore (1923–2016), American mathematician
- John Franklin Moore (1822–1877), American farmer and developer in North Carolina
- John H. Moore (1939–2016), American anthropologist
- John Moore (economist) (born 1954), British economist
- John Moore (anarchist) (1957–2002), British anarchist and professor
- John Moore (patent), American civil complainant about patent relating to his body's cell line
- John Godfrey Moore (1847–1899), American businessman, financier and Wall Street stock market promoter

== Other uses ==
- USS John A. Moore (FFG-19), U.S. Navy frigate (1981–2000)

== See also ==
- John More (disambiguation)
- Johnny Moore (disambiguation)
- John Francis Moore (disambiguation)
- John Henry Moore (disambiguation)
- John Moores (disambiguation)
- Jackie Moore (disambiguation)
