= John More =

John More may refer to:

== Politicians ==
- John More (MP for City of London), represented City of London 1383-1384
- John More (died 1620), MP for Winchester and Portsmouth
- John More (died 1638) (1578–1638), MP for Lymington in 1624 and 1626
- John More (MP for Cumberland) (fl. 1404), MP for Cumberland
- John More (MP for Barnstaple) (fl. 1421–23), MP for Barnstaple
- John More (by 1506 – 1581), MP for Winchelsea
- John More (c. 1520 – c. 1576), MP for West Looe and Dartmouth
- John More (MP for Ipswich) (died 1588), MP for Ipswich
- John More (died 1583), MP for Worcester
- John T. More (1771–1857), political figure in Roxbury, NY and the state of New York

== Others ==
- Sir John More (judge) (c.1451–1530), English lawyer and judge
- John More, grandson of the judge and son of Thomas More
- John More (minister) (died 1592), English clergyman
- John Shank More (1784–1861), chair of Scots law at the University of Edinburgh
- Major John More, drew up the Uqair Protocol of 1922
- John Marion More (1830–1868 ), American miner and founder of Idaho City, Idaho
- Johnny More (1934–2015), English comedy impressionist

== See also ==
- John Moore (disambiguation)
