= Benjamin Jowett =

English writer and classical scholar (1817–1893)

The Reverend Benjamin Jowett
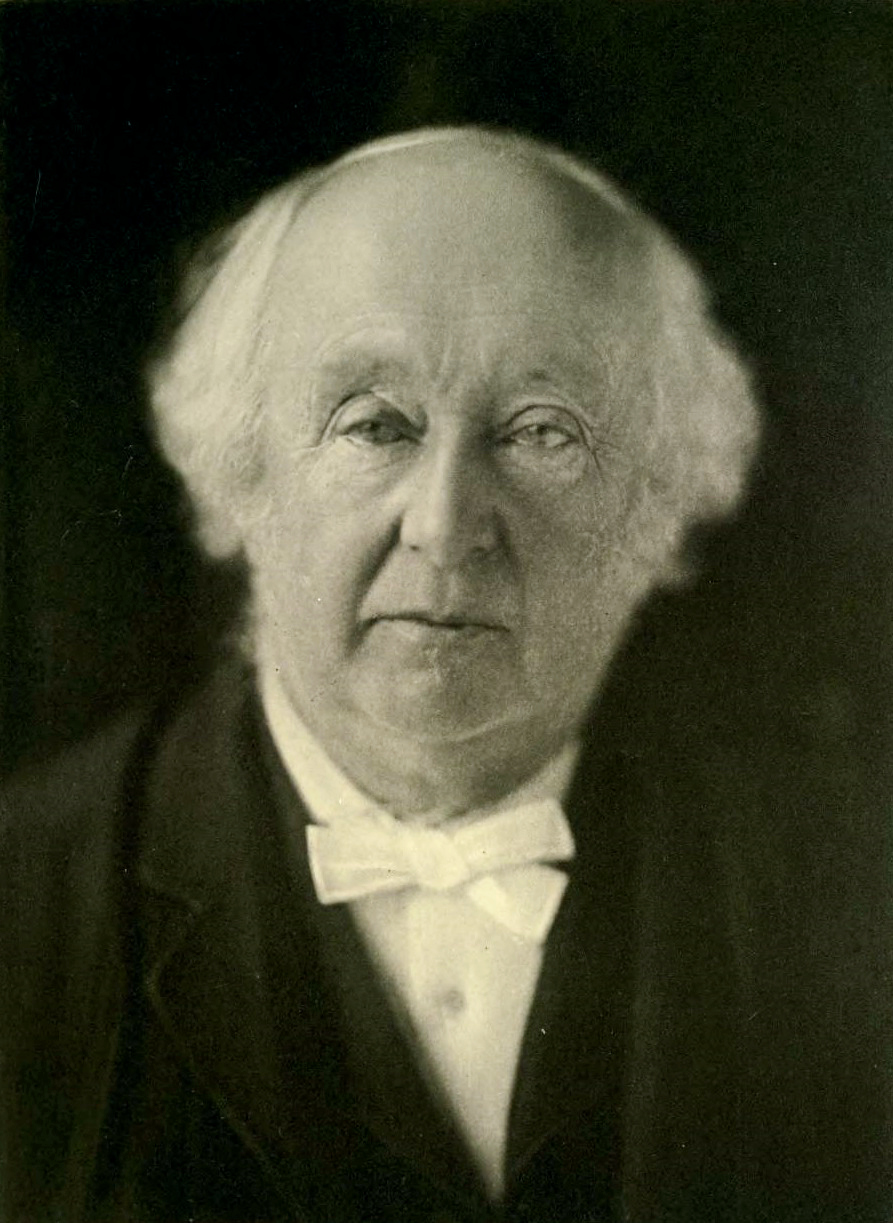
- Jowett in 1893
- Born: 15 April 1817; Camberwell, London, England
- Died: 1 October 1893 (aged 76); Alton, Hampshire, England
- Occupations: Writer; scholar
- Known for: Being a writer, scholar, and translator of Plato and Thucydides

Academic background
- Education: Balliol College, Oxford
- Academic advisor: A. P. Stanley

Academic work
- Institutions: Balliol College, Oxford
- Notable students: Edward Caird; T. H. Green; Walter Pater

Signature
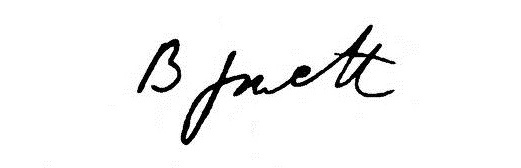

Benjamin Jowett (/ˈdʒoʊɪt/, modern variant /ˈdʒaʊɪt/; 15 April 1817 – 1 October 1893) was an English writer, classical scholar, and Anglican deacon. Additionally, he was an administrative reformer in the University of Oxford, theologian, Anglican cleric, and translator of Plato and Thucydides. He was master of Balliol College, Oxford.

== Early life and education ==
Jowett was born in Camberwell, London, the third of nine children. His father was a furrier originally from a Yorkshire family that, for three generations, had been supporters of the Evangelical movement in the Church of England, and an author of a metrical translation of the Old Testament Psalms. His mother, Isabella Langhorne (1790–1869), was related to John Langhorne, the poet and translator of Plutarch. At the age of 12, Jowett was placed on the foundation of St Paul's School (then located in St Paul's Churchyard) where he soon gained a reputation as a precocious classical scholar.

At the age of 18, Jowett was awarded an open scholarship to Balliol College, Oxford, where he remained for the rest of his life. He began his studies in 1836, and was quickly recognised as one of the leading Oxford dons of his generation, made a Fellow while still an undergraduate in 1838; he graduated with first-class honours in 1839. This was at the height of the Oxford Tractarian movement: through the friendship of W. G. Ward, he was drawn for a time in the direction of High Anglicanism; but a stronger and more lasting influence was that of the Arnold school, represented by A. P. Stanley. The controversy caused Jowett to withdraw from High Table at college to lodgings in Broad Street.

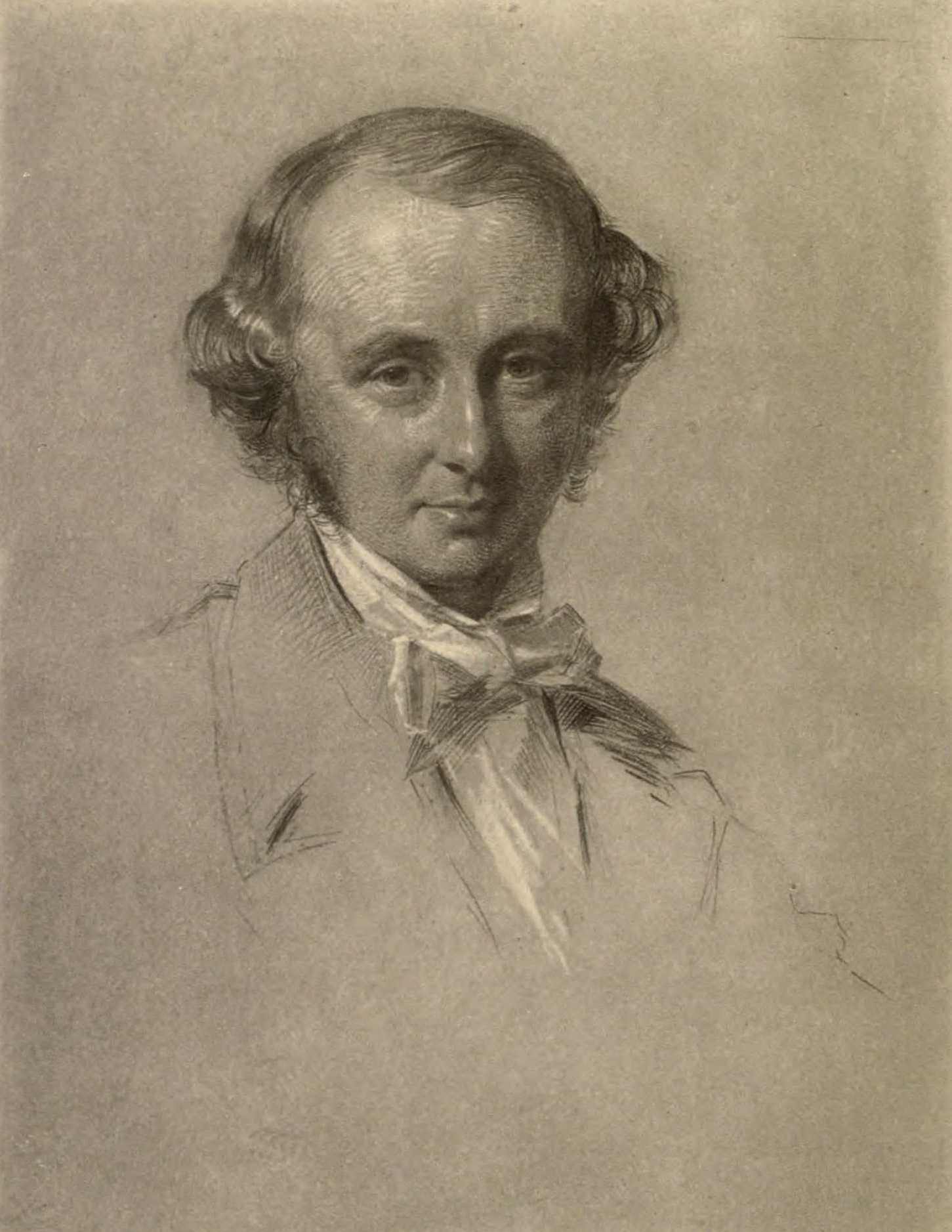
Benjamin Jowett, by George Richmond, 1854

== Heretical controversialist ==
As early as 1839, Stanley had joined with Archibald Campbell Tait, the future Archbishop of Canterbury, in advocating certain university reforms. From 1846 onwards, Jowett threw himself into this movement, which in 1848 became general amongst the younger and more thoughtful Fellows, until it took effect in the commission of 1850 and the Oxford University Act 1854. Jowett then concentrated on theology: he spent the summers of 1845 and 1846 in Germany with Stanley, and became an eager student of German criticism and speculation. His views became more than radical, they were heretical, which severely curtailed prospects for advancement within the walls of the conformity of Anglican Oxford. Among the writings of that period he was most impressed by those of F. C. Baur. But he never ceased to exercise an independent judgement, and his work on St Paul, which appeared in 1855, was the result of much original reflection and inquiry.

Jowett found a friend and correspondent in Florence Nightingale, but whether there was any romantic attachment is unclear. It has been suggested that he belatedly proposed marriage, but was rejected, and lived the latter part of his life in regret that he never knew matrimonial bliss. Jowett's didactic and pedagogic nature tended him towards instruction of her complicated character accusing her of exaggeration, an emotional intensity occasioned by hysteria. He was a father figure, paternalistic towards a deeply conservative woman, religious, self-censoring and strict in her conduct. Another educational reform, the opening of the Indian Civil Service to competition, took place at the same time, and Jowett was one of the commission. He had two brothers, William and Alfred who had served and died in India, and he never ceased to take a deep and practical interest in Indian affairs. After the Second Royal Commission in May 1859 he called Nightingale "the Governess of Governors of India" for her robust dealings with the poor conditions in Calcutta "the natives themselves ... educated to cleanliness & health by the enforcement of sanitary regulations in the large towns." When an old man he visited Claydons, where Margaret Verney donated him a print portrait of Nightingale which he later bequested in his will to Somerville College. A. Sorabji, an Indian writer, was a student barrister at Somerville College in 1890s, when the master of Balliol, pointing to the picture declared her love for him: the story was never confirmed. In another story entirely Margot Tennant later wife of Henry Asquith, befriended Jowett, only to learn that he had had a "violent ... very violent" relationship with Nightingale. Jowett was an éminence grise of liberal theology but could be somewhat chaotic in his recollections. (Note: from a Gentleman's Pocket Daily Companion, 1877, BL 45847, was one of the few that survived Nightingale's executors; and perhaps as unreliable as Margot Tennant's Autobiography (1920), p. 75)

== Oxford career ==
Jowett was appointed to the Regius Professorship of Greek in autumn 1855. He had been a tutor of Balliol and an Anglican cleric since 1842 and had devoted himself to the work of tuition: his pupils became his friends for life. He discerned their capabilities and taught them to know themselves. This made him a reputation as "the great tutor".

A great disappointment, his repulse for the mastership of Balliol, also in 1854, appears to have roused him into the completion of his book on The Epistles of St Paul. This work, described by one of his friends as "a miracle of boldness", is full of originality and suggestiveness, but its publication awakened against him a storm of theological opposition from the Evangelicals, which followed him more or less through life. Instead of yielding to this, he joined with Henry Bristow Wilson and Rowland Williams, who had been similarly attacked, in the production of the volume known as Essays and Reviews. This appeared in 1860 and gave rise to a strong outbreak of criticism. Jowett's loyalty to those who were prosecuted on this account was no less characteristic than his persistent silence while the augmentation of his salary as Greek professor was withheld. This persecution was continued until 1865, when E. A. Freeman and Charles Elton discovered by historical research that a breach of the conditions of the professorship had occurred, and Christ Church, Oxford, raised the endowment from £40 a year to £500. Jowett was one of the recipients of Nightingale's three volume work Suggestions for Thought for proof-reading and criticism. In the third volume of Essays and Reviews he contributed On the Interpretation of Scripture in which he attempted to reconcile her assertion that religion was law and could be unified with science. Her radical thoughts on women's place in the home, and his departure from liberal Anglican theology helped to block for a decade his career advancement to the mastership of Balliol. By 1860, he was already Regius Professor of Greek and a Fellow of Balliol, but an increase in his stipend was withheld. While the work gained fulsome praise from philosopher-politician John Stuart Mill, it profoundly shook the more traditional establishment's fervent belief that the working-classes would continue to worship in parish churches. Recognition that this was no longer so, was just one of the theological departures. In October 1862 he was invited to Oak Hill Park to offer Nightingale the sacrament. Accepting the prospect with relish, he nonetheless consulted with Archbishop Tait for permission. Many of his letters to Nightingale and Mrs Bracebridge have survived; their religion was tinged with a mutual respect for their shared common interests and intellectual gifts. Also included is an unflattering description of a middle-aged man.

== Height of intellectual powers ==
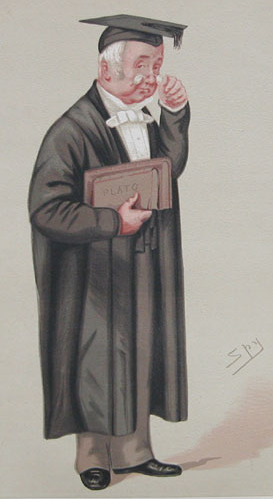
Benjamin Jowett, by Sir Leslie Ward, 'Spy', 1876

Meanwhile, Jowett's influence at Oxford had steadily increased; he had his favourites. It culminated when the country clergy, provoked by the final acquittal of the essayists, had voted in convocation against the endowment of the Greek chair. Jowett's pupils, who were now drawn from the university at large, supported him with enthusiasm. He made friends with the Freemantles (related to Gladstone's minister, Grant Duff), and the Verneys at Claydons. On holiday in Derbyshire he would write to them and Nightingale, describing his findings at Lea Hurst in 1864. One historian has identified his relations with her as being most intense between 1863 and 1866: in April 1864, he had advised Florence Nightingale to prevent Garibaldi, her world-famous guest, from stirring up trouble in Italy. This coincided with a big philosophical argument in which they were poles apart: there were three major pieces of sanitary legislation, the Contagious Diseases Acts, which in 1870 came under fire from Josephine Butler, a feminist and social reformer, who wished their repeal. The rational theologian in Jowett warned Nightingale to ignore those "on the wrong tack". Rising incidents of venereal disease posed a moral question about whether to regulate prostitution, when men still might die from the infection. Policing of the health conditions became a case for which women's rights campaigners demanded repeal, and they launched a vociferous attack in the press on Jowett, among others. He was a compassionate man, visiting the selfless Hilary Bonham Carter (dying from cancer) in May 1865, administering his own brand of prayer and kindness. He was a staunch critic of the Poor Laws that condemned the poor, sick, and vulnerable to appalling degradation, leaving people to starve. In London alone in 1866 there were 21,500 patients with no trained nurses. But his influence could be profound. In 1874, he criticised Nightingale's impending Report of Land Tenure in India to the extent that it was never published, because she "could lose influence".

In the midst of other labours, Jowett had been quietly exerting his influence so as to conciliate all shades of liberal opinion, and bring them to bear upon the abolition of the theological test, which was still required for the M.A. and other degrees, as well as for university and college offices. He spoke upon this question at an important meeting in London on 10 June 1864, which laid the ground for the Universities Tests Act 1871. Directly after, as master of Balliol College, he made the college "a sort of heaven on earth". The liberal reforms to college commenced radical scientific enquiries into the nature of man's existence, questioning on the basis of empirical data the meaning of Christianity and its very existence. The shock waves reverberated through the liberal establishment, into the founding of the Labour Party and the New Liberalism of the Great War.

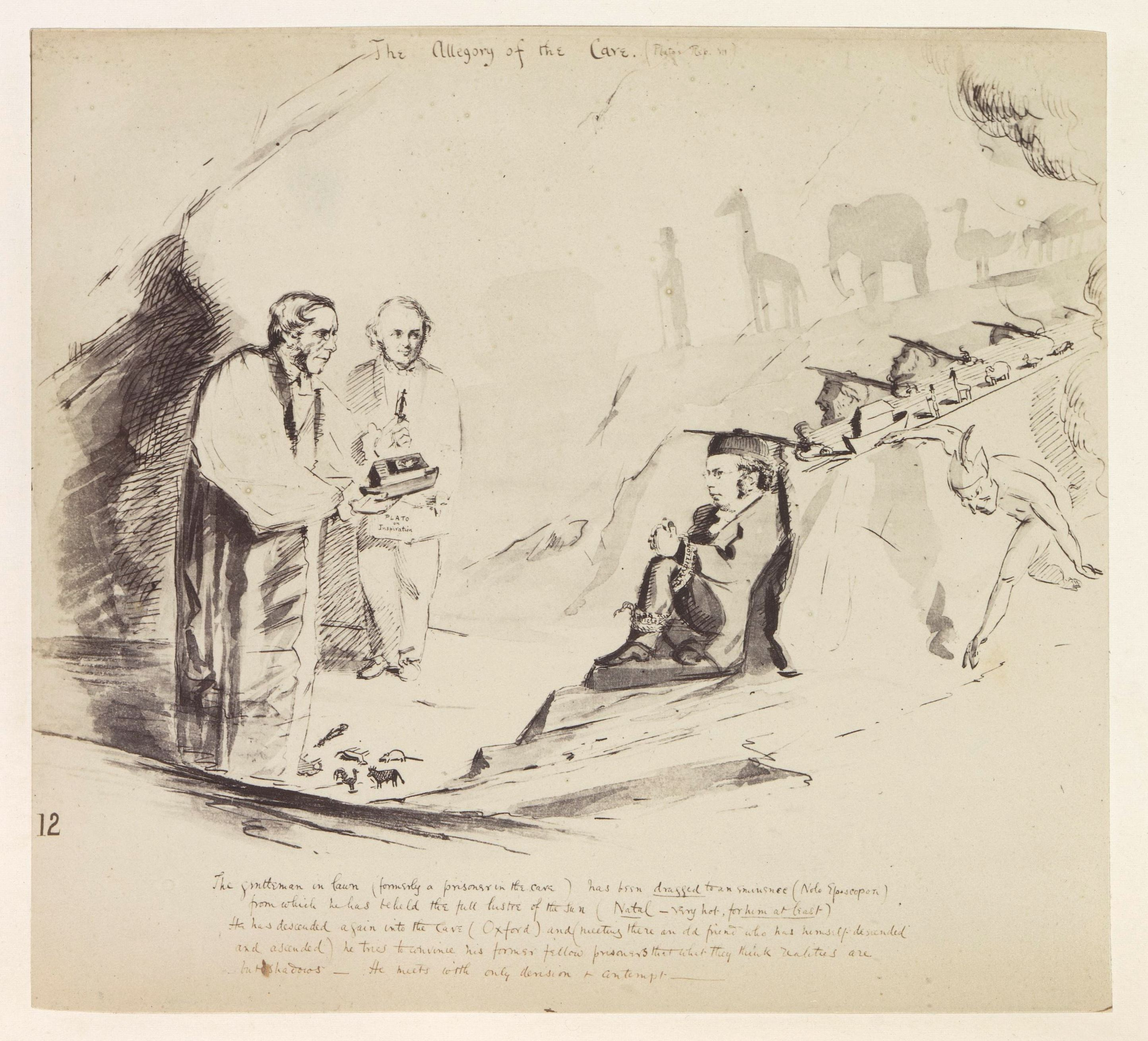
The Allegory of the Cave -caricature with John Colenso, Jowett and Henry Longueville Mansel.

In connection with the Greek professorship, Jowett had undertaken a work on Plato which grew into a complete translation of the Dialogues with introductory essays, for which Florence Nightingale's criticism was gratefully received. At this he laboured in vacation time for at least ten years. He argued that platonic love between men was devoid of sexual activity, though Walter Pater would later disagree. He showed no interest in offering his own opinion on God or theology in his translations, in several editions, of Plato's works. The educated middle-classes were looking for an answer to how Plato could be relevant to Victorians. But his interest in theology had not abated, and his thoughts found an outlet in occasional preaching. The university pulpit, indeed, was closed to him, but several congregations in London delighted in his sermons, and from 1866 until the year of his death he preached annually in Westminster Abbey, where Stanley had become Dean in 1863. Three volumes of selected sermons were published posthumously. The years 1865–70 were occupied with assiduous teaching and writing.

Among his pupils at Balliol were men destined to high positions in the state, whose parents had thus shown their confidence in the supposed heretic, and gratitude on this account was added to other motives for his unsparing efforts in tuition. Robert Scott, master of Balliol College, was promoted to the deanery of Rochester in 1870, and Jowett, finally after years of trying, was elected to the vacant mastership by the Fellows of Balliol. Jowett attributed this arrangement to his liberal friend Robert Lowe, afterwards Lord Sherbrooke (at that time a member of Gladstone's ministry). From the vantage-ground of this long-coveted position, the Plato was published in 1871. It had a great and well-deserved success. While scholars criticized particular renderings (and there were many small errors to be removed in subsequent editions), it was generally agreed that he had succeeded in making Plato an English classic.

Benjamin Jowett, by Max Beerbohm, 1922

From 1866, his authority in Balliol had been paramount, and various reforms in college had been due to his initiative. The opposing minority were now powerless, and the younger Fellows who had been his pupils were more inclined to follow him than others would have been. There was no obstacle to the continued exercise of his firm and reasonable will. He still knew the undergraduates individually, and watched their progress with a vigilant eye. His influence in the university was less assured. The pulpit of St Mary's, the university church, was no longer closed to him, but the success of Balliol in the schools gave rise to jealousy in other colleges, and old prejudices did not suddenly give way; while a new movement in favour of "the endowment of research" ran counter to his immediate purposes.

Meanwhile, the tutorships in other colleges, and some of the headships also, were being filled with Balliol men, and Jowett's former pupils were prominent in both houses of parliament and at the bar. He continued the practice, which he had commenced in 1848, of taking with him a small party of undergraduates in vacation time, and working with them in one of his favourite haunts, at Askrigg in Wensleydale, or Tummel Bridget or later at West Malvern. Included in this list was Abel Hendy Jones Greenidge who became recognised as equal to the great classical scholar Theodor Mommsen. The new hall (1876), the organ there, entirely his gift (1835) and the cricket ground (1889), remain as external monuments of the master's activity. Neither business nor the many claims of friendship interrupted literary work. The six or seven weeks of the long vacation, during which he had pupils with him, were mainly employed in writing. The translation of Aristotle's Politics, the revision of Plato, and, above all, the translation of Thucydides many times revised, occupied several years. The edition of the Republic, undertaken in 1856, remained unfinished, but was continued with the help of Professor Lewis Campbell.

Other literary plans were not to take effect – an Essay on the Religions of the World, a Commentary on the Gospels, a Life of Christ, a volume on Moral Ideas. Such plans were frustrated, not only by his practical avocations, but by his determination to finish what he had begun, and the fastidious self-criticism which it took so long to satisfy. The book on Morals might, however, have been written but for the heavy burden of the vice-chancellorship, which he was induced to accept in 1882, by the hope, only partially fulfilled, of securing many improvements for Oxford University. The Vice-Chancellor was ex officio a delegate of the Oxford University Press, where he hoped to effect much; and a plan for draining the Thames Valley, which he had now the power of initiating, was one on which his mind had dwelt for many years.

However, one plan that certainly came to fruition to great applause was the co-operation with Florence Nightingale to bring a lecture tour to Oxford for undergraduates training in the agricultural sciences for the Indian Civil Service. It was supported by economist Arnold Toynbee, also at Balliol, and W R Robertson, Principal of Madras Agricultural College. For the first time, Indians would receive a proper education in the technical aspects of forestry and farming.

== Later life and death ==
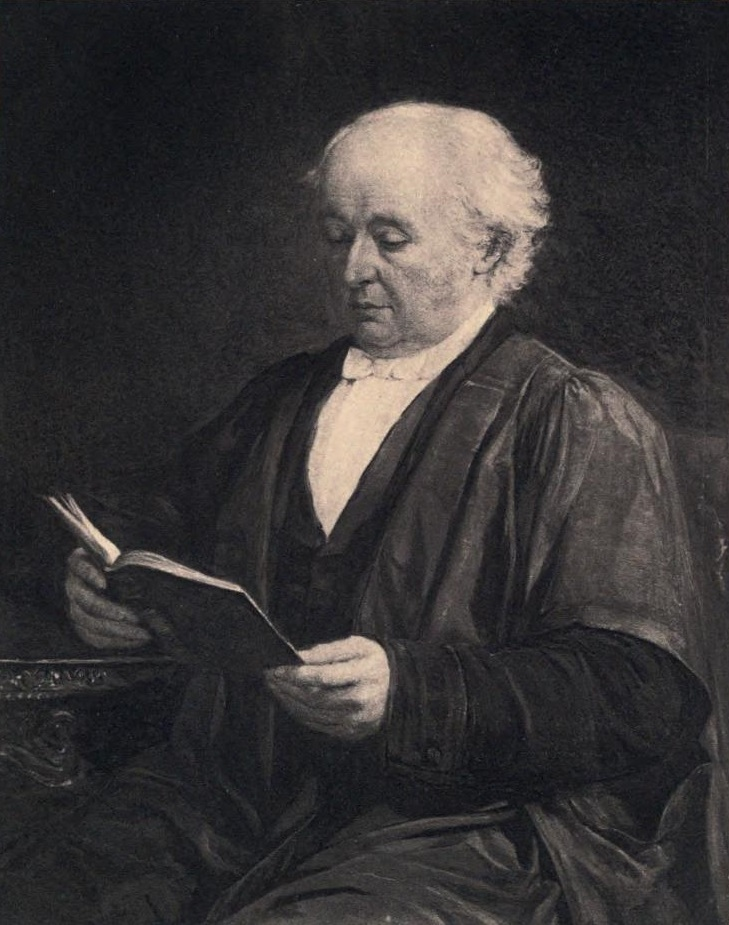
Benjamin Jowett

The exhausting labours of the vice-chancellorship were followed by illness (1887); after this he relinquished the hope of producing any great original writing. His literary industry was thenceforth confined to a commentary on the Republic of Plato, and some essays on Aristotle which were to have formed a companion volume to the translation of the Politics. The essays which should have accompanied the translation of Thucydides were never written. Jowett, who never married, died on 1 October 1893 in Oxford. The funeral was one of the most impressive ever seen in that city. The pall-bearers were seven heads of colleges and the provost of Eton, all old pupils.

Theologian, tutor, university reformer, renowned master of an Oxford college, Jowett's best claim to the remembrance of succeeding generations was his greatness as a moral teacher. Many of the most prominent Englishmen of the day were his pupils and owed much of what they were to his precept and example, his penetrative sympathy, his insistent criticism, and his unwearying friendship. Seldom have ideal aims been so steadily pursued with so clear a recognition of practical limitations. "Dear (tho perfidious) Professor" Jowett's theological work was transitional; yet has an element of permanence, "Mr Jowett put as much of his genius into Plato as Plato did into Mr Jowett', eulogised Florence Nightingale on her old friend.

As has been said of another thinker, he was "one of those deeply religious men who, when crude theological notions are being revised and called in question seek to put new life into theology by wider and more humane ideas." In earlier life he had been a zealous student of Immanuel Kant and G. W. F. Hegel, and to the end he never ceased to cultivate the philosophic spirit; but he had little confidence in metaphysical systems, and sought rather to translate philosophy into the wisdom of life. As a classical scholar, his scorn of littlenesses sometimes led him into the neglect of minutiae, but he had the higher merit of interpreting ideas. A well-known Balliol rhyme about him runs:

Here come I, my name is Jowett.
All there is to know I know it.
I am Master of this College,
What I don't know isn't knowledge!

Jowett is buried in St Sepulchre's Cemetery off Walton Street in Oxford.

== Legacy ==
- Jowett Walk in central Oxford is named after him.
- He appears as "Dr Jenkinson" in The New Republic, by William Hurrell Mallock.
- Jowett appears briefly as a character in Louis Auchincloss's novel The Rector of Justin (1964).
- Jowett also appears as a minor character in Tom Stoppard's play The Invention of Love (1997).
- The Great Jowett was a 1939 radio play based on his life, written by Graham Greene.

== Publications ==
- Benjamin Jowett (1881). Thucydides Translated into English. Vol. 1. Clarendon Press.
- Benjamin Jowett (1881). Thucydides Translated into English. Vol. 2. Clarendon Press.
- Benjamin Jowett (1892). The Dialogues of Plato, in 5 vols 3rd edition revised and corrected. Oxford University Press.

== See also ==
- History of translation

== Sources ==
- Abbott, Evelyn & Lewis Campbell (1899) [1897]. The Life and Letters of Benjamin Jowett, M.A., Master of Balliol College, Oxford, a supplement. Vol. 1 at the Internet Archive Vol. 2 at the Internet Archive
- John Bibby: HOTS: History of Teaching Statistics for original documents.
- Bostridge, Mark (2015). Florence Nightingale: The Woman and Her Legend. Penguin. ISBN 978-0-14-193080-0.
- Faber, Geoffrey (1958). Jowett: A Portrait with Background. Cambridge: Harvard University Press.
- Hinchliff, Peter Bingham (1987). Benjamin Jowett and the Christian Religion. Clarendon Press. ISBN 978-0-19-826688-4.
- Stephen, Leslie (1898). "Jowett's Life" . Studies of a Biographer. Vol. 2. Duckworth & Co. pp. 123–159.
- Tollemache, Lionel Arthur (1895). Benjamin Jowett, Master of Balliol. London: Edward Arnold.

Academic offices
Preceded by Robert Scott	Master of Balliol College, Oxford; 1870–1893	Succeeded by Edward Caird
Preceded by Evan Evans	Vice-Chancellor of Oxford University; 1882–1886	Succeeded by James Bellamy
