= Jackie Moore =

Jackie Moore may refer to:

- Jackie Moore (basketball) (1932–2026), American professional basketball player
- Jackie Moore (baseball) (born 1939), American baseball player, manager, and coach
- Jackie Moore (singer) (1946–2019), American R&B singer
- Jacqueline Moore (born 1964), American professional wrestler
- Jacqueline S. Moore (1926–2002), American poet
- Jackie Moore, stage name of Dora Nicolosi (née Carofiglio), singer of Valerie Dore and Novecento

== See also ==
- John Moore (disambiguation)
