= I am dynamite =

I am dynamite refers to a quotation by Friedrich Nietzsche. It may also refer to:

- I Am Dynamite! A Life of Nietzsche, a 2018 biography of Nietzsche by Sue Prideaux
- I Am Not a Man, I Am Dynamite! Friedrich Nietzsche and the Anarchist Tradition, a 2005 book by John Moore
