= John Francis Moore =

John Francis Moore may refer to:

- John Francis Moore (bishop) (1942–2010), Irish priest who was a bishop in Africa
- John Francis Moore (writer), American comic book writer for Marvel Comics and DC Comics
- John Francis Moore (politician) (1816–1870), English lumber merchant who was mayor of Hamilton, Ontario
- John Francis Moore (sculptor) (died 1809), British sculptor prominent in the late 18th century whose work can be found amongst the important figures in Westminster Abbey

== See also ==
- John Moore (disambiguation)
