= Oakworth Hall =

House in Oakworth, West Yorkshire, England

Coordinates: 53.8453°N 1.9522°W

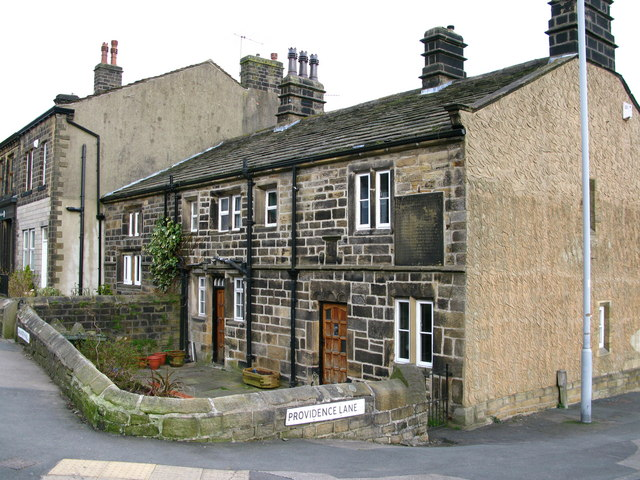
Oakworth Hall

Oakworth Hall is located in Oakworth, West Yorkshire, England. The manor house was rebuilt in the 17th century, but has a history dating back to 1066. The building overlooks the Worth Valley, facing south towards Haworth.

Nearby is Holden Park, which was the site of Oakworth House and its grounds, once owned by Sir Isaac Holden, an inventor who is said to have invented the lucifer match and revolutionised the process of carding wool. He also owned Oakworth Hall.

== External features ==
South Elevation of Oakworth Hall

The Hall is located on the corner of Providence Lane, which once ran through the Hall's farmyard. The cornerstone on the north rear wall, above the door of the farm cottage, is one of four found in the district commissioned by John Craven in July 1843.

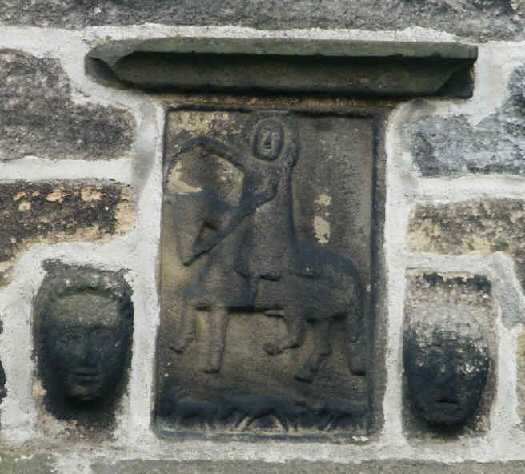
Huntsman carving at Oakworth Hall

Of important historical interest is a carved stone panel of a mounted huntsman of either Celtic origins or Romano-British of the first centuries CE. Accompanying the huntsman there are three small animals which might be taken to be dogs, but in the History of Keighley they are described as "three goats trippant". A goat is featured on the coat of arms on one branch of the Copley family who were early residents of the Hall. The panel may be even earlier, perhaps pre-Roman Iron Age. Two crude heads, which are thought to be of the same period, flank the carving.

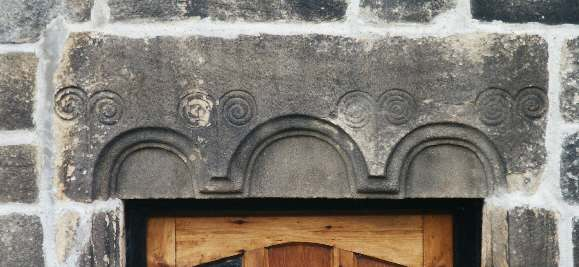
Lintel above the front door of Oakworth Hall

The lintel above the door on the north side of the farm cottage is a curiously carved stone with triple rounded arches and double spiral decorative motifs. Both this stone and the panel came from the surrounding moors and it is believed they were incorporated into the building for good luck.

== Internal features ==
The main fireplace in Oakworth Hall

All the original fireplaces have been preserved. There is a large inglenook fireplace, ten feet across, in the dining room. Next to the fireplace is a salt cellar. Salt was very important for the preservation of food and had to be stored in the driest place in the building. Stored in the salt cellar today is a pair of very small, leather, children's shoes which were discovered during restoration work on a chimney. Shoes were traditionally secreted away in the Middle Ages to ward off evil spirits and to bring good fortune to the residents of the Hall. Two oak beams in the dining room are 18 inches by 10 feet and actually extend throughout the Hall. The original adze marks are clearly in evidence.

In the kitchen there is an old oven. It has a cast iron interior and is surrounded by large stones. It is reputed to be the oldest oven in Yorkshire that is still capable of use. From the kitchen, steps lead down to a cellar. On the first floor, two of the six bedrooms have arched gothic style windows to provide light on the landing. The windows have stone mullions. All the doors are constructed of solid English oak and the handsome front door dates from when that part of the building was rebuilt in 1702.

In the study there is an original fireplace and cast iron stove. This is almost identical to the one in the later-built Brontë Parsonage Museum in nearby Haworth.

The Hall (now numbers 69 and 71 Colne road) is a Grade II listed building and is subject to a Preservation Order.

== The History of the Hall ==
- 1066 – Mentioned in the Domesday Book as the Manor of Oakworth. It was given by William the Conqueror to Gilbert Tyson.
- 1366 – Property of the de Vaux family who were probably descendants of the Tyson family. The de Vaux families' main seat was Vauxhall (Vaux Hall, in south east London). They had large properties in northern England from South Yorkshire up to Hadrian's Wall. Thomas de Vaux was Chancellor of Richard I during the earlier Crusades to the Holy Land.
- 1598 – Alvery Copley, the last member of the de Vaux family, died and the 32 tenants who farmed the lands were constituted Lords of Oakworth Manor. It is believed that the first building which stood on the site was built by the de Vaux family.
- 1662 – The famous Baptist Minister John Moore was born at Oakworth Hall. He was a friend and close colleague of William Mitchell who was imprisoned for preaching in 1687. Together they clandestinely crisscrossed the Pennines visiting various safe houses in both Lancashire and West Yorkshire. It is thought that the previous building of Oakworth Hall was one of those "safe houses". It is advanced that the destruction of the previous building of Oakworth Hall was as a result of the turbulent period of religious persecution. It is also suggested that the old building was burned down to smoke out a "priest hole" that had existed beneath the Hall since the Reformation.
- 1691 – Oakworth Hall is mentioned in the Keighley Rolls in the entry for 12 December 1691. Some travellers visited the Squire, Anthony Moore, at Oakworth Hall.
- 1702 – The rebuilding of the Hall was probably completed by William Clough in its present form. The date 1702 is over the door on the south side of the Farm Cottage.
- 1708 – William Clough of Oakworth Hall is mentioned in the Haworth Court Rolls.
- 1715 – Jamas Haggas of Oakworth Hall bound as an apprentice to a Halifax weaver. Later, he bought long wool in Lincolnshire and sorted wool with his son at Oakworth Hall. These documents are in the deeds of the Hall. The Hall is mentioned in Heaton's Yorkshire Woollen and Worsted Industries.
- 1883 – Sold by the descendants of the Haggas family, (Blamire and Craven) to Richard Longdon Hattersly.
- 1913 – Trustees of the Hattersly family sold the Hall to Benjamin, William and John Speight who were plumbers.

(The families Clough, Haggas and Hattersly all became large textile manufacturers in the spinning and weaving industries in the West Riding of Yorkshire. The Cloughs became mohair spinners and weavers and the firm still exists today as British Mohair Spinners. Haggas became the largest worsted spinners in the area and there is still a large manufacturing plant in Keighley. The Hattersleys owned a number of worsted and woollen Mills and factories producing textile and weaving booms. There is still today Hattersley Narrow Fabrics Mill in Keighley.)

- 1936 – The Speight family sold the Hall to the Yorkshire Penny Bank.
- 1945 – When the Bank closed its Oakworth branch the Hall was bought by the Assistant Manager of the bank. It became a private residence once again. It changed hands a number of times and was a guest house from 1979–2002.
- 2003 – The Hall is now a private residence.
