= Jonas Hanway =

English merchant, writer and philanthropist (1712–1786)

Jonas Hanway FRSA
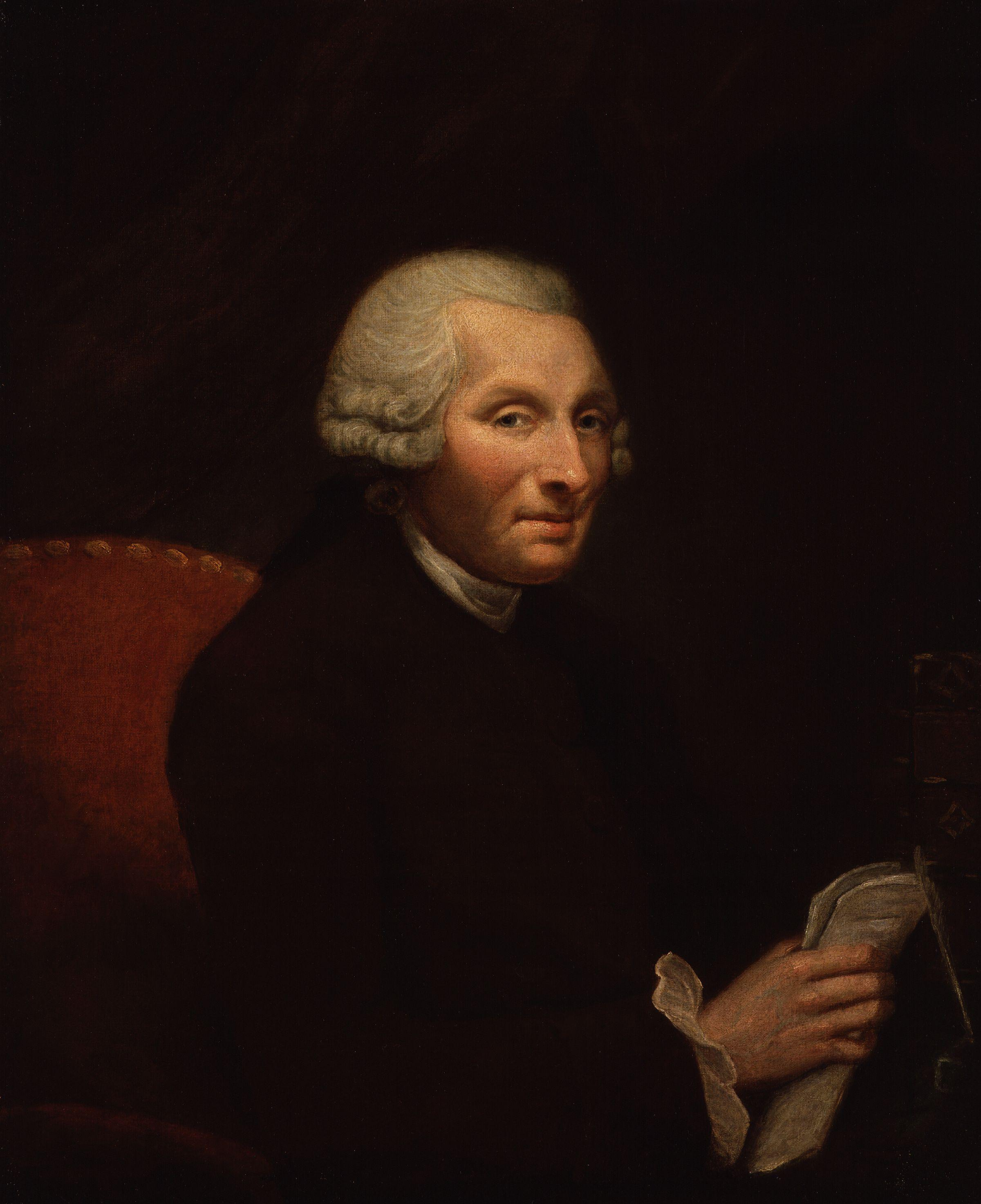
- Portrait of Hanway by James Northcote, c. 1785
- Born: 12 August 1712; Portsmouth
- Died: 5 September 1786 (aged 74); London
- Occupations: Philanthropist, traveller

Jonas Hanway, FRSA (12 August 1712 – 5 September 1786), was an English merchant, writer and philanthropist. He was the first male Londoner to carry an umbrella and was a noted opponent of tea drinking. Hanway created seventy-four printed works, mostly pamphlets, on a wide variety of subjects. Of literary importance is the Historical Account of British Trade over the Caspian Sea, with a Journal of Travels, etc. (London, 1753). He is also cited frequently for his work with the Foundling Hospital in London, particularly his pamphlets detailing the earliest comparative "histories" of the foundation versus similar institutions abroad.

== Life ==
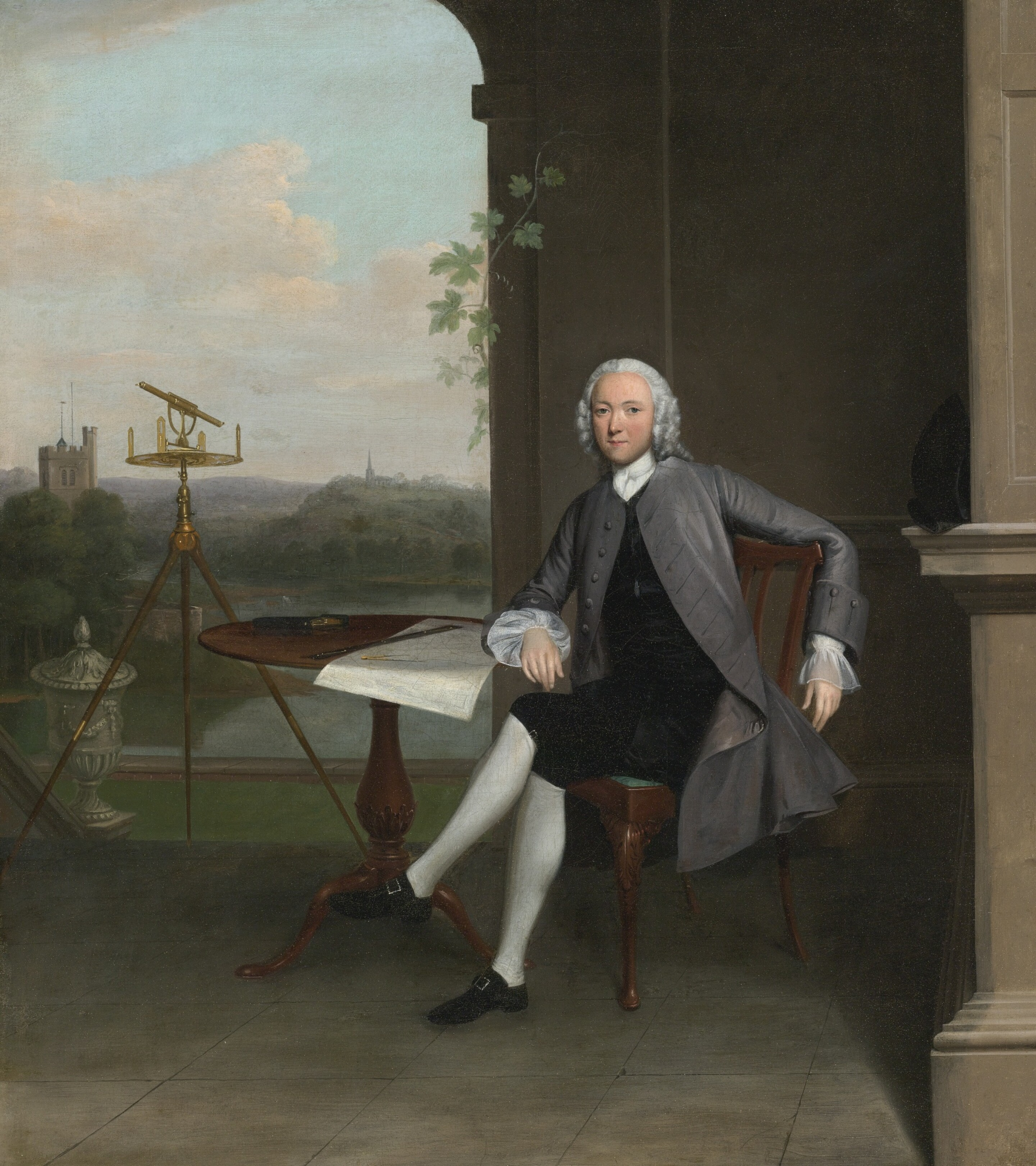
Portrait of Hanway by Arthur Devis

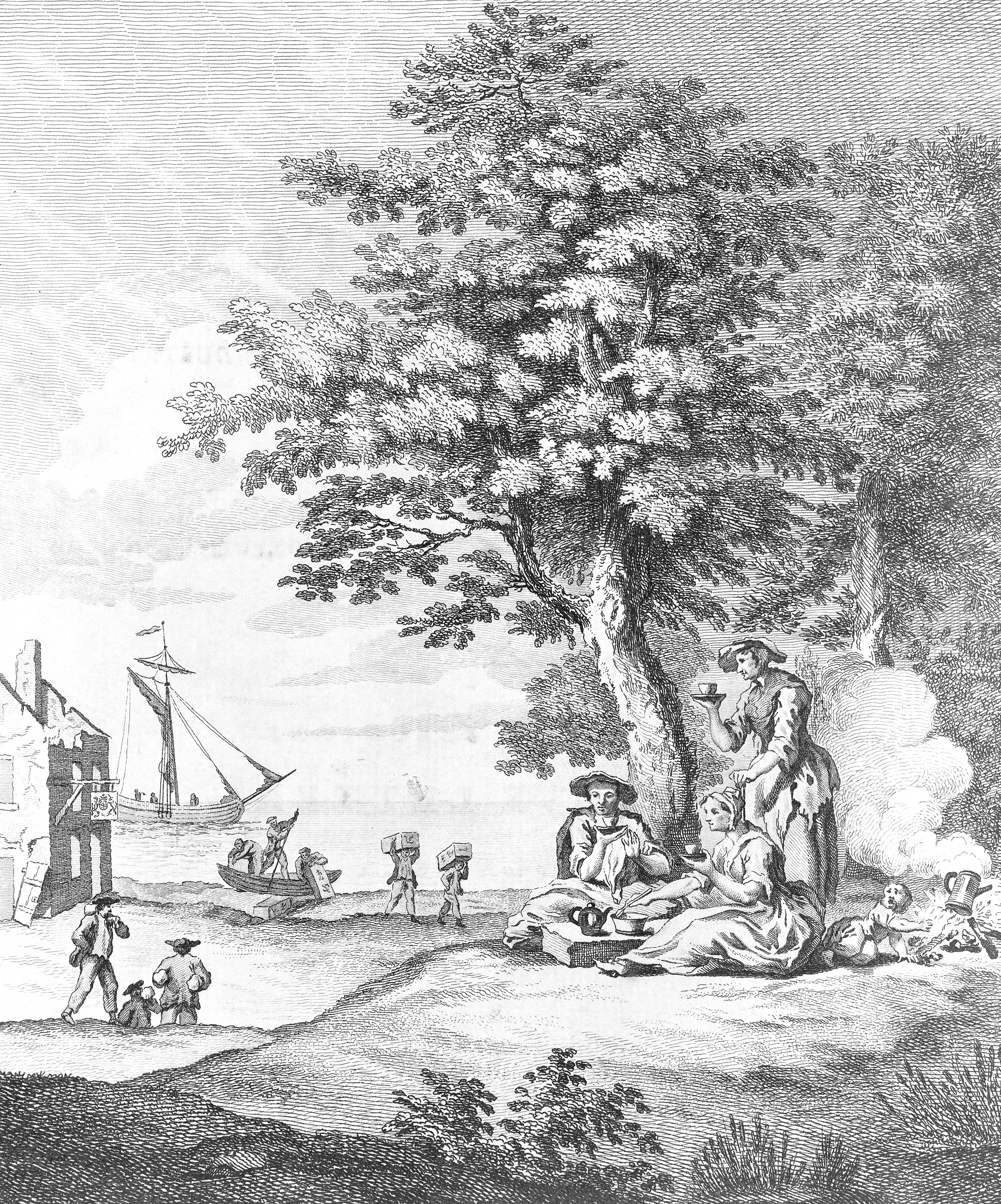
The frontispiece to the Essay on Tea with a scene of "picturesque beggars drinking tea" outdoors. Behind, Chinese tea chests are unloaded from a boat, passing a pub in ruins.

Hanway was born in Portsmouth, on the south coast of England. While still a child, his father, who had been a victualler, died, and the family subsequently moved to London.

In 1729, Jonas was apprenticed to a merchant in Lisbon. In 1743, after he had been in business for himself for some time in London, he became a partner with Mr Dingley, a merchant in St Petersburg, and in this way was led to travel in Russia and Persia. Leaving St Petersburg on 10 September 1743, and passing south by Moscow, Tsaritsyn and Astrakhan, he embarked on the Caspian Sea on 22 November and arrived at Astrabad on 18 December. Here his goods were seized by Mohammed Hassan Beg, and it was only after great privations that he reached the camp of Nadir Shah, under whose protection he recovered most (85%) of his property.

His return journey was embarrassed by sickness (at Resht), attacks from pirates, and six weeks' quarantine; he only arrived at St Petersburg on 1 January 1745. He again left the Russian capital on 9 July 1750 and travelled through Germany and the Netherlands to England (28 October). The rest of his life was mostly spent in London, where the narrative of his travels (published in 1753) soon made him a man of note, and where he devoted himself to philanthropy and good citizenship.

===== Philanthropy =====
In 1756, Hanway founded The Marine Society, to keep up the supply of British seamen; in 1758, he became a governor of the Foundling Hospital, a position which was upgraded to vice president in 1772; he was instrumental in the establishment the Magdalen Hospital;

In 1761 he advocated for a better system of parochial birth registration in London. The Act, passed in 1762, Parishes were required to maintain records of the children in their care. In Hanway's investigations into the treatment of the infant poor he estimated that children under the age of four has a life expectancy of just one month after entering a London workhouse.

In 1762 he was appointed a commissioner for victualling the navy (10 July); this office he held until October 1783.

==== Umbrella ====
Hanway was the first male Londoner, it is said, to carry an umbrella, (following women who had been using umbrellas since 1705) and he lived to triumph over all the hackney coachmen who tried to hoot and hustle him down.

===== Campaigns =====
He attacked vail-giving, or tipping, with some temporary success. He also advocated solitary confinement for prisoners and opposed naturalisation of non-British Jews. His last efforts were on behalf of child chimney-sweeps.

===== Death =====
He died, unmarried, on 5 September 1786 aged 74 and was buried in the crypt at St. Mary's Church, Hanwell. A monument to his memory, sculpted by John Francis Moore was erected in the north transept at Westminster Abbey in 1786.

== Opposition to tea ==
Hanway was a staunch opponent of tea drinking. In 1756, he authored An Essay on Tea which argued that tea was "pernicious to health, obstructing industry and impoverishing the nation". Hanway stated that tea drinking caused bad breath, ugliness and weakened the nerves. Hanway was concerned about the nation's economic loss from the tea trade with China. He believed that Britain's national wealth was being given to other countries instead of being used in preparing the nation's defence and that excessive tea drinking was weakening the British population.

The Essay said: "To what a height of folly must a nation be arrived, when the common people are not satisfied with wholesome food at home, but must go to the remotest regions to satisfy a vicious palate! There is a certain lane near Richmond where beggars are often seen, in the summer season, drinking their tea. You may see labourers who are mending the roads drinking their tea; it is even drank in cinder-carts; and what is no less absurd, sold out of cups to Hay-makers.

The frontispiece to the Essay showed a scene of "picturesque beggars drinking tea" outdoors.

In 1757, Samuel Johnson, a tea drinker, wrote an anonymous negative review of Hanway's essay for the Literary Magazine. This led to a heated dispute between them. Johnson's review was controversial as it criticised the Foundling Hospital. The governors of the hospital considered taking legal action against the publisher of the Literary Magazine. However, the publishers of the magazine did not apologise or reveal Johnson's name but decided it was time for him to hand in his resignation as a reviewer.

Johnson did not dispute some of Hanway's attack, saying: "I... shall therefore readily admit, that tea is a liquor not proper for the lower classes of the people, as it supplies no strength to labour, or relief to disease, but gratifies the taste without nourishing the body."
