= Essays and Reviews =

1860 broad-church volume of seven essays on Christianity

- Author: Frederick Temple, Rowland Williams, Baden Powell, Henry Bristow Wilson, C. W. Goodwin, Mark Pattison, Benjamin Jowett
- Language: English
- Genre: essays, reviews
- Publisher: John W. Parker and Son, West Strand, London
- Publication date: 1860
- Publication place: England

Essays and Reviews, published by John William Parker in March 1860, is a broad-church volume of seven essays on Christianity. The topics covered the biblical research of the German critics, the evidence for Christianity, religious thought in England, and the cosmology of Genesis. Despite lacking originality, the book was popular due to its high-profile authors, and "caused a furore among English Christians by its readiness to adopt (in a very moderate way) the methods of biblical criticism".

The book is not to be confused with other books titled Essays and Reviews, which is a generic title that has been used for many other books, none of which have been as notable as this one.

== Authors ==
Each essay was authored independently by one of six Church of England churchmen and one layman. There was no overall editorial policy and each contributor chose his own theme. The six church essayists were: Frederick Temple, who later became Archbishop of Canterbury; Rowland Williams, then tutor at Cambridge and later Professor and Vice-Principal of St David's University College, Lampeter; Baden Powell, clergyman and Professor of Geometry at Oxford; Henry Bristow Wilson, fellow of St John's College, Oxford; Mark Pattison, tutor at Lincoln College, Oxford; and Benjamin Jowett, Fellow of Balliol College, Oxford (later Master) and Regius Professor of Greek, Oxford University. The layman was Charles Wycliffe Goodwin, former fellow of St Catharine's College, Cambridge, Egyptologist, barrister and, later, Assistant Judge of the British Supreme Court for China and Japan.

== Content ==
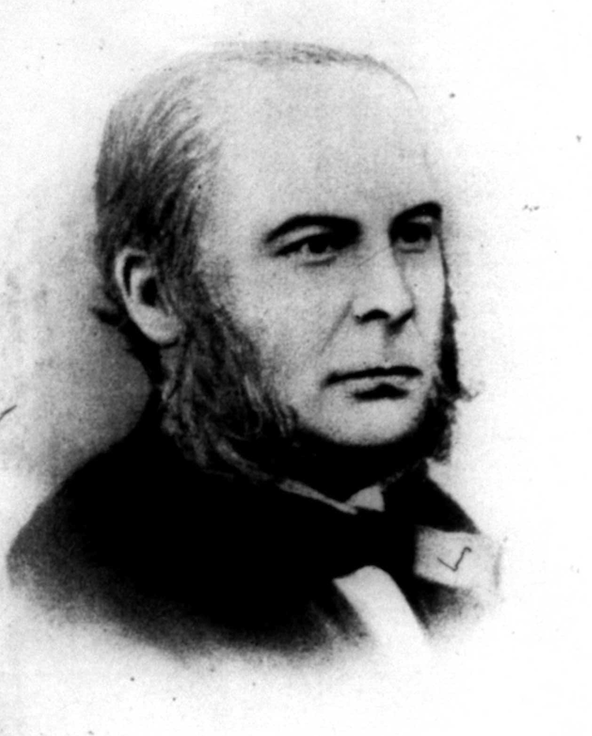
Charles Goodwin

These are the titles and authors of the essays, with Altholz's one-sentence summary of each one.

1. The Education of the World by Frederick Temple—"a warmed-over sermon urging the free study of the Bible"
2. Bunsen's Biblical Researches by Rowland Williams—"denying the predictive character of Old Testament prophecies"
3. On the Study of the Evidences of Christianity by Baden Powell—"flatly denied the possibility of miracles"
4. Séances Historiques de Genève. The National Church by Henry Bristow Wilson—"gave the widest possible latitude to the Thirty-nine Articles and questioned the eternity of damnation"
5. On the Mosaic Cosmogony by C. W. Goodwin—"a critique of the attempted 'Harmonies' between Genesis and geology"
6. Tendencies of Religious Thought in England, 1688-1750 by Mark Pattison—"a learned and cold study of the evidential theologians of the eighteenth century"
7. On the Interpretation of Scripture by Benjamin Jowett—"in which he urged that the Bible be read 'like any other book' and made an impassioned plea for freedom of scholarship"

=== Jowett on biblical interpretation ===
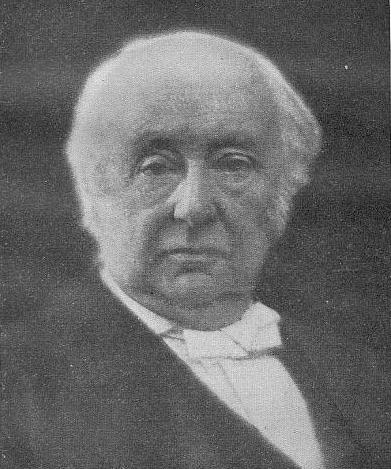
Benjamin Jowett

The essay "On the Interpretation of Scripture", contributed by Benjamin Jowett, was "by far the most startling essay" in the book. When asked to contribute, Jowett saw the opportunity to challenge traditionalists. He was a rationalist and insisted that the Bible ought to be treated as scholars treated classical texts. Jowett was a proponent of progressive revelation in which the later books were seen to be closer to the ultimate revelation of God as seen in Jesus Christ as revealed in the Gospels. The epistles and other New Testament writings were seen to look back.

The implications of Jowett's essay and his other writings that revelation was ongoing and that scripture was always subject to reinterpretation as each generation encountered them were the target of his traditionalist foes. Jowett felt he was being slandered for his honesty concerning his beliefs, but he suffered no actual penalty other than an infamously low salary at Christ Church, Oxford. However, in 1863 Jowett was brought before the vice-chancellor's court for teaching contrary to the doctrines of the Church of England; the case was eventually dropped.

=== Wilson on eternal punishment ===
Another "of the two most controversial" essays was H.B. Wilson's, which denied the eternity of hell, affirming that there can be spiritual progress in the afterlife after the day of judgment. Wilson wrote:

The Roman Church has imagined a limbus infantium; we must rather entertain a hope that there shall be found, after the great adjudication, receptacles suitable for those who shall be infants, not as to years of terrestrial life, but as to spiritual development—nurseries as it were and seed-grounds, where the undeveloped may grow up under new conditions—the stunted may become strong, and the perverted be restored. And when the Christian Church, in all its branches, shall have fulfilled its sublunary office, and its Founder shall have surrendered His kingdom to the Great Father—all, both small and great, shall find a refuge in the bosom of the Universal Parent, to repose, or be quickened into higher life, in the ages to come, according to his Will.

Wilson's views on hell were challenged by the church courts as being incompatible with the plain sense of the Athanasian Creed, to which all Anglican clergy were bound to subscribe. (This creed, better known for its views on the Trinity, happens to mention "everlasting fire" near the end.) An adverse judgment was rendered against Wilson by Dr. Lushington, dean of the Court of Arches, that is, the court of appeal for the province of Canterbury. Wilson appealed the judgment, and in 1864 the appeal was allowed; Dr. Lushington's decision was reversed by the Judicial Committee, and the case dismissed without costs to Wilson. The court, speaking through Lord Chancellor Westbury, declared:

We are not required, or at liberty, to express any opinion upon the mysterious question of the eternity of final punishment, further than to say that we do not find in the formularies, to which this article refers, any such distinct declaration of our Church upon the Subject as to require us to condemn as penal the expression of hope by a clergyman, that even the ultimate pardon of the wicked, who are condemned in the day of judgment, may be consistent with the will of Almighty God.

This judgment "produced very diverse reactions". It "caused a firestorm of protest, especially from Evangelicals and Anglo-Catholics", but "Dean Stanley regarded it as a charter of intellectual freedom within the walls of the establishment."

== Controversy ==
According to Altholz, "little" of the book's content "was original, though it was new to most Englishmen"; it did not represent "the cutting edge of biblical scholarship" in its time. Still, because of its date and its authors, the book led to a great controversy—the book was published four months after Charles Darwin's On the Origin of Species, and much of the indignation aroused by the book "was due to the fact that the writers were mainly clergymen bound by their ordination vows and the Thirty-nine Articles". Essays sold 22,000 copies in two years, more than Origin sold in its first twenty years. It sparked five years of increasingly polarized debate with books and pamphlets furiously contesting the issues.

The book summed up a three-quarter-century-long challenge to biblical history by the higher critics and to biblical prehistory by scientists working in the new fields of geology and biology. Baden Powell restated his argument that God is a lawgiver, miracles break the lawful edicts issued at the creation, therefore belief in miracles is atheistic, and wrote of "Mr Darwin's masterly volume" that the Origin of Species "must soon bring about an entire revolution in opinion in favour of the grand principle of the self-evolving powers of nature."

"Outwardly, the conflict ended inconclusively, with the acquittal of Williams and Wilson by the courts and the condemnation of the volume by the clergy in Convocation. At a deeper level, it marked the exhaustion both of the Broad Church and of Anglican orthodoxy and the commencement of an era of religious doubt."

=== Reception ===
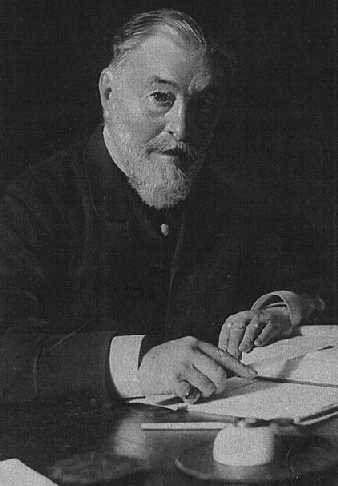
Frederic Harrison

A review by Frederic Harrison published in the Westminster Review in October 1860 had the probably undesired effect of stimulating the attack on the book. Harrison saw the essays as neither religious nor rational which was a double blow to the seven who saw the essays as promoting rational religion.

In January 1861, an anonymous review was published in the Quarterly Review. The author was later revealed as Samuel Wilberforce, the Bishop of Oxford. The Quarterly review was followed up by a letter to The Times co-signed by the Archbishop of Canterbury and 25 bishops which threatened the theologians with the ecclesiastical courts. Darwin quoted a proverb: "A bench of bishops is the devil's flower garden", and joined others including the eminent geologist Charles Lyell, and the mathematician and Queen's printer William Spottiswoode, in signing a counter-letter supporting Essays and Reviews for trying to "establish religious teachings on a firmer and broader foundation".

On the subject, the mathematician Charles Dodgson (better known for his novels, published under the name Lewis Carroll) wrote, "Let E = Essays, and R = Reviews: then the locus of (E + R), referred to multilinear coordinates, will be found to be a superficies (i.e., a locus possessing length and breadth, but no depth)."

=== Resolution ===
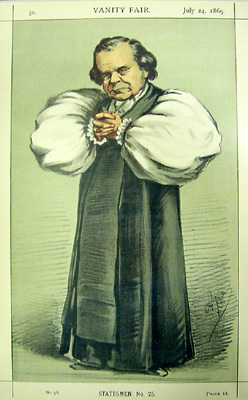
Samuel Wilberforce

Despite this alignment of pro-evolution scientists and Unitarians with liberal churchmen, Williams and Wilson were charged with heresy in the Court of Arches. They were found guilty on some of the counts by the Dean of Arches, Stephen Lushington, but appealed to the Judicial Committee of the Privy Council. The Judicial Committee comprised secular judges sitting with the Archbishop of Canterbury, the Archbishop of York and the Bishop of London. In 1864 it overturned the convictions, with the Archbishops of Canterbury and York dissenting in part (though the Bishop of London concurred in the decision). It was said that the Privy Council had "dismissed hell with costs". 11,000 clergy and 137,000 laity signed a letter of thanks to the Archbishops of Canterbury and York for voting against the committee, and a declaration in favour of biblical inspiration and eternal torments was drawn up at Oxford and circulated to the 24,800 clergy, being signed by eleven thousand of them. Wilberforce went to the Convocation of Canterbury and in June obtained "synodical condemnation" of Essays and Reviews.

== Influence ==
In 1862, John William Colenso, a bishop in the Church of England, authored The Pentateuch and Book of Joshua Critically Examined. The book, which denied the Mosaic authorship of the Pentateuch, defended "even more radical views" on biblical scholarship than the ones in Essays and Reviews, which caused "much greater dismay" and helped bring such views into the mainstream.

Essays and Reviews helped spread the ideas of German higher criticism, in particular those of Ferdinand Christian Baur, to an English audience. In this, the book was succeeded by Lux Mundi (1890).

In their time, the essays were described by their opponents as heretical, and the essayists were called "The Seven Against Christ." But Essays and Reviews was nevertheless influential; S.C. Carpenter estimated that "four-fifths of the actual contents of the book has since been digested into the system of the Church", and C. John Collins has stated that "Jowett's hermeneutic has, in many ways, won the day in how biblical scholars read the Bible."

== See also ==
- Anglicanism
- Church of England
- Liberal Christianity
