= Rowland Williams (priest) =

Welsh Anglican priest and writer

Rowland Williams (bapt. 27 March 1779 – 28 December 1854) was a Welsh Anglican priest and writer.

== Life ==
Williams, from Mallwyd, Merionethshire, Wales, was baptised on 27 March 1779. After being taught at a school in the local church and by the vicar of Betws-yn-Rhos, he attended Ruthin School and then (from 1798 to 1802) Jesus College, Oxford, obtaining a Bachelor of Arts degree in 1802 and a Master of Arts degree in 1805. After his ordination in 1802 by John Randolph, Bishop of Oxford, he was an usher at Friars School, Bangor and also curate of Llandygai. He then held other parish appointments in north Wales from 1807 as vicar of Cilcain, vicar of Halkyn, vicar of Meifod and, from 1836 until his death, vicar of Ysceifiog, Flintshire.

Williams was an enthusiast for Welsh literature and regarded as an authority on the Welsh language. He was involved in literature for the Welsh Anglican church, such as the revision of the Welsh Book of Common Prayer. He contributed to various church magazines and published sermons. He was married with three sons (including the theologian Rowland Williams) and five daughters. He died on 28 December 1854. St Asaph Cathedral contains a memorial window for him at the west end of the building.
