= Johnny Moore =

Johnny Moore may refer to:

- Johnny Moore (basketball) (born 1958), American basketball player
- Johnny Moore (baseball) (1902–1991), American baseball player
- Johnny Moore (singer) (1934–1998), American soul singer and songwriter, played with The Drifters
- Johnny Moore (trumpeter) (1938–2008), founding member of The Skatalites
- Johnnie Moore Jr. (born 1983), American evangelical leader
- Johnny Moore (1906–1969), group leader and guitarist with Johnny Moore's Three Blazers
- Johnny B. Moore (born 1950), Chicago electric blues guitarist and singer
- Johnny Moore (soccer) (born 1947), former Scottish-U.S. soccer player

== See also ==
- John Moore (disambiguation)
