= The Great Jowett =

1939 radio play by Graham Greene

The Great Jowett was a BBC radio play written by Graham Greene. First broadcast on Saturday 6 May 1939, it was produced and narrated by Stephen Potter. The play chronicles the life of an Oxford don, Benjamin Jowett during the 19th century and his struggles to be a Master for a college whilst translating Plato.

== Characters ==
- Commentator
- Mr Griggs - Oxford Guide
- Mr Foster - head porter of Balliol
- Benjamin Jowett
- Matthew Knight - his servant
- Arthur Stanley
- Green, Peel, Ross and Smith - fellows of Balliol
- The Vice Chancellor
- Paine and Plumer - Undergraduates
- Algernon Swinburne
- Dr Scott - Master of Balliol
- Mrs Sparks - a Landlady
- Archbishop of Canterbury
- Matthew Arnold
- Miss Knight - Jowett's housekeeper
