= John Moores =

John Moores may refer to:

- John H. Moores (1821–1880), American businessman and politician in the state of Oregon
- Sir John Moores (British businessman) (1896–1993), British businessman who founded Littlewoods
- John Moores Jr. (1928–2012), his son, businessman and chancellor of Liverpool John Moores University
- John Moores (baseball) (born 1944), American entrepreneur and former owner of the San Diego Padres
- Liverpool John Moores University, a university in Liverpool, England, named after Sir John Moores

== See also ==
- John Moore (disambiguation)
