= Oakworth =

Village in West Yorkshire, England

Coordinates: 53.846°N 1.954°W

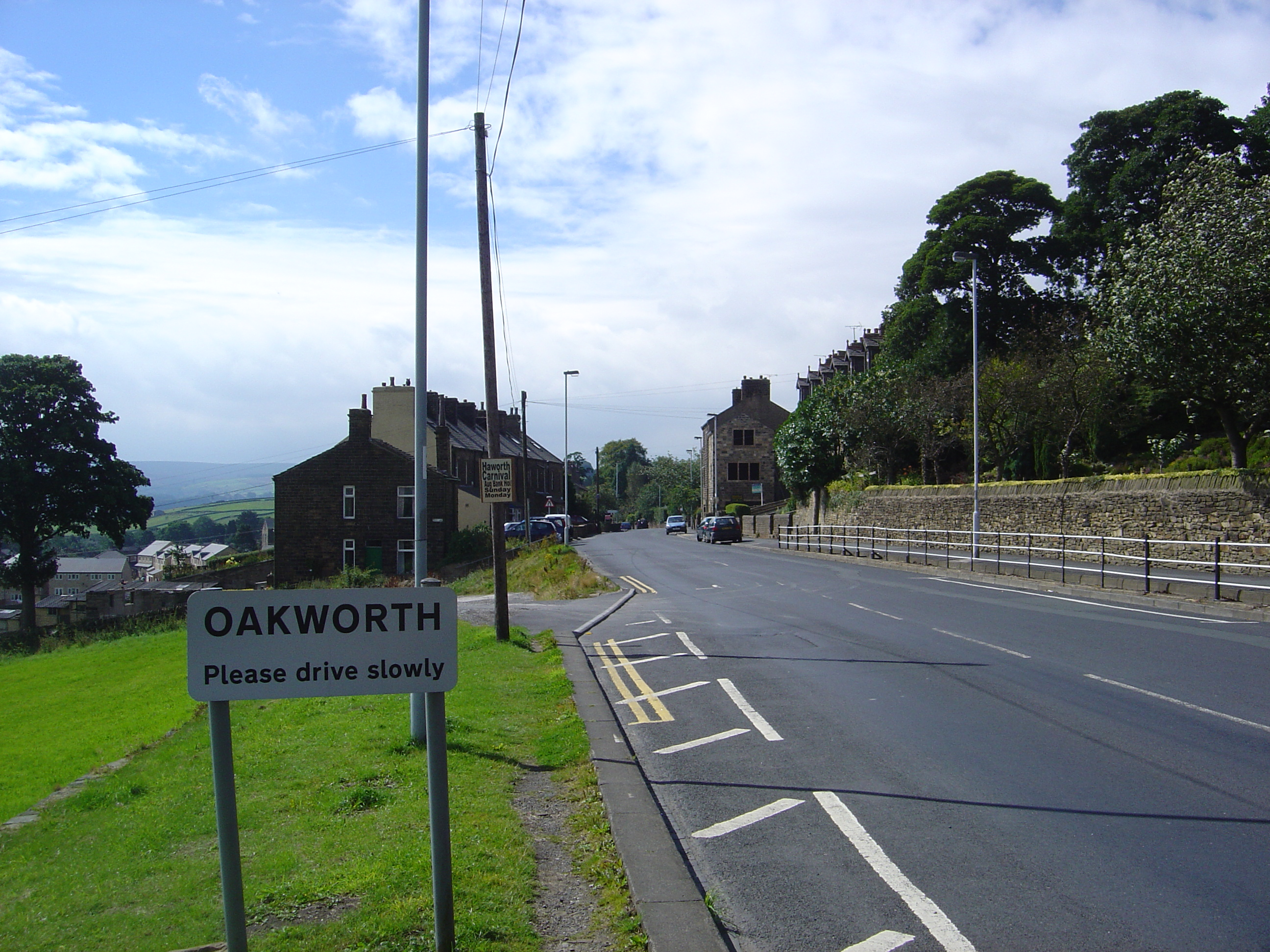
- Keighley Road, Oakworth

- Location within West Yorkshire
- OS grid reference: SE0338
- Civil parish: Keighley
- Metropolitan borough: City of Bradford
- Metropolitan county: West Yorkshire
- Region: Yorkshire and the Humber
- Country: England
- Sovereign state: United Kingdom
- Post town: Keighley
- Postcode district: BD22
- Police: West Yorkshire
- Fire: West Yorkshire
- Ambulance: Yorkshire

Oakworth is a village in the civil parish of Keighley, in the Bradford district, in West Yorkshire, England, near Keighley, by the River Worth. The name "Oakworth" indicates that the village was first established in a heavily wooded area.

Oakworth railway station is on the route of the Keighley and Worth Valley Railway and was a location in the 1968 TV series and 1970 film The Railway Children.

== History ==
On folio 301v of the Domesday Book of 1086, Oakworth is called "Acurde" which translated into an Oak clearing. It was taxed on c120 acres (c50 hectares) of arable ploughland shared by the Vikings Vilts and Gamel Bern. Vilts also owned Newsholme and Utley; and Gamel Bern was of the family of noblemen that held the most land in Northern England. However, later, on folio 327r, the Domesday Book states of Oakworth lands that "Gamal Bern had them; Gilbert Tison has them" for in the Harrying of the North all lands were taken from Anglo-Scandinavians and given to Norman Lords.

Oakworth was formerly a chapelry in the parish of Keighley, in 1894 Oakworth became an urban district, on 31 December 1894 Oakworth became a civil parish, being formed from the part of the parish of Keighley in Oakworth Urban District, on 1 April 1938 the district was abolished and merged with the Municipal Borough of Keighley. On 1 April 1937 the parish was abolished and merged with Keighley. In 1931 the parish had a population of 3530.

== Landmarks ==
Holden Park in Oakworth occupies the grounds of an historic house owned by Sir Isaac Holden, an inventor who is said to have invented the lucifer match and revolutionised the process of wool carding. After Holden's death in 1897, his house, called Oakworth House, and its contents were sold at auction, and the house was all but destroyed by fire in 1907. All that remains of the original building is the portico.

== Education ==
Oakworth Primary School is situated in the grounds of Sir Isaac Holden's former estate, along with Holden Park. The school playground has sloping sides because it was once a lake in the ornamental gardens in front of Oakworth House. The school is attended by children aged between 3 to 11. It has gone through many changes since it was first built. Its original name was 'Oakworth First School', which taught children up to the age of 9, when children would then progress to middle school. This system changed in 2000, so that Oakworth Primary School expanded to cover years 5 and 6.

== See also ==
- Brontë Country
- Haworth
- Listed buildings in Keighley
- Oakworth Hall
- Oldfield
