= John Moore (biblical scholar) =

English biblical scholar

- Born: 19 December 1742
- Died: 16 June 1821 (aged 78)
- Occupation: Biblical scholar

John Moore (19 December 1742 – 16 June 1821) was an English biblical scholar.

== Biography ==
Moore was the son of John Moore, rector of St. Bartholomew the Great, London, by his wife Susanna, daughter of Peter Surel of Westminster, was born on 19 December 1742, and educated at Merchant Taylors' School, where he became head scholar in 1756. He matriculated from St. John's College, Oxford, on 28 June 1759, graduated B.A. 15 April 1763, and subsequently took the degree of LL.B. During his residence at the university he was singularly serviceable to Kennicott in the arduous task of collating the Hebrew manuscripts of the Old Testament. On 11 Nov. 1766 he became sixth minor prebendary in the cathedral of St. Paul, London, and he was transferred to the twelfth minor prebend and appointed sacrist in 1783. He became priest of the chapel royal; lecturer of St. Sepulchre's; rector of St. Michael Bassishaw, London, 19 Oct. 1781; rector of Langdon Hill, Essex, 1798; and president of Sion College, London, in 1800. He died at Langdon Hill on 16 June 1821.

He married Sarah Lilley, and had a daughter, Mary Anne, wife of Harry Bristow Wilson, B.D., under-master of Merchant Taylors', and mother of Henry Bristow Wilson, the historian of the school.

His works are:

- ‘An Attempt to Recover the original reading of 1 Sam. xiii. 1, to which is added an Enquiry into the Duration of Solomon's Reign,’ London, 1797, 8vo.
- ‘Prophetiæ de septuaginta hebdomadis apud Danielem explicatio; concio ad clerum habita in æde D. Alphægii; adjiciuntur ad calcem notæ, in quibus fusius tractantur quædam et illustrantur,’ London, 1802, 8vo.
- ‘Case respecting the Maintenance of the London Clergy, briefly stated, and supported by Reference to Authentic Documents,’ London, 1802, 8vo; 2nd edit. 1803; 3rd edit. ‘altered to meet the Report made by a Special Committee of the Court of Common Council,’ London, 1812, 8vo.
- ‘An attempt to throw further Light on the Prophecy of Isaiah, chap. vii. 14, 15, 16,’ London, 1809, 8vo.

He vainly endeavoured to publish by subscription Brian Walton's very rare and curious work on the ecclesiastical history of London (Todd, Life of Walton, i. 7).
