= Holden Park =

Park in Oakworth, West Yorkshire, England

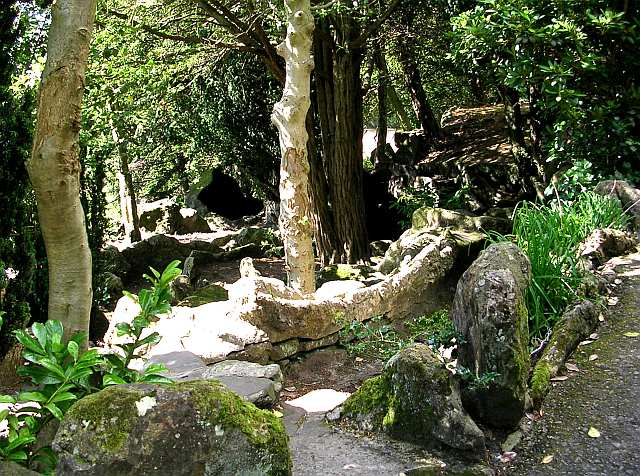
- Holden Park, Oakworth
- Interactive map of Holden Park
- Type: Urban Park
- Location: Oakworth, West Yorkshire
- Nearest city: Bradford
- Coordinates: 53.8472°N 1.9501°W
- Created: 1927
- Operator: City of Bradford, Parks and Landscape Services
- Status: open all year round

Holden Park is the only park in the village of Oakworth, West Yorkshire, England. The park is also known locally as Oakworth Park.

== History ==
The park was the former grounds of Sir Isaac Holden's house (Oakworth House) and garden. Oakworth house was a large Italianate villa built from 1864–74 by architect George Smith at a cost of £80,000 for Sir Isaac Holden. The house replaced a smaller house on the site built by Joseph Sugden. In 1907, ten years after Sir Isaac's death in 1897, the house was partially destroyed in a fire and was demolished.

Holden Park was opened by Francis Illingworth in 1925 and in 1927 was given to the people of Oakworth by the family of Sir Isaac Holden.

The stone portico to the house remains to this day but the glasshouses or winter gardens have been removed and all that remains of the winter gardens are the caves and grotto created by Holden. A bowling green was constructed on the site of the house.

In April 2004 the Friends of Holden Park group was formed, consisting mostly of local people with the aim of preserving and protecting the remaining features of the park with support from the local community. In 2011 the summerhouse, known locally as the 'bear house' was restored by The Friends of Holden Park with monies from CNet's grassroots fund. In 2012 a new blue plaque to Sir Isaac Holden was unveiled on the portico by Sir Paul Holden (Bart.)—Sir Isaac's great grandson at a fun day to celebrate the Queen's diamond jubilee.

== Landmarks ==
The park contains the local war memorial, a stone portico entrance—the only surviving remnant of Oakworth House; and Holden's summer house, made from a steel framework and hypertufa shaped to look like wooden branches. Past the grottoes and caves there is a large grassed area that used to be the vegetable garden for the house and was later a putting green, and above this are the woods, with many paths originally laid out by Holden.

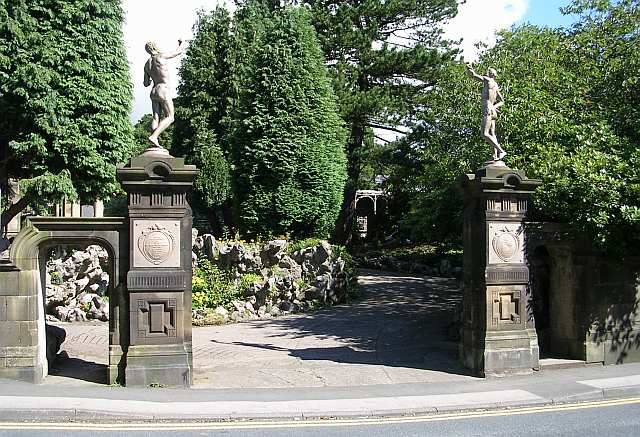
Park entrance

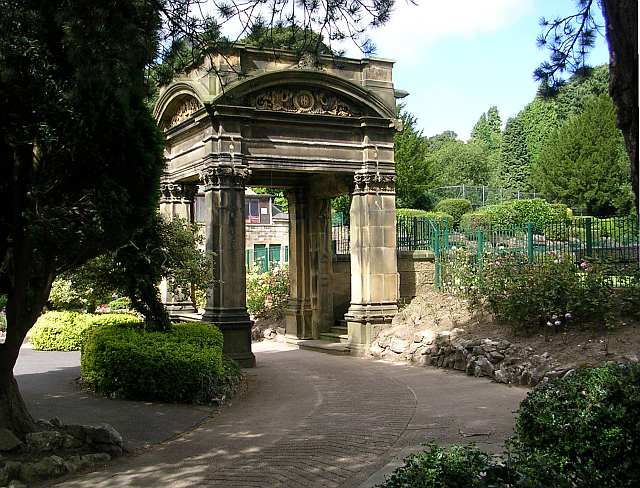
Stone portico entrance

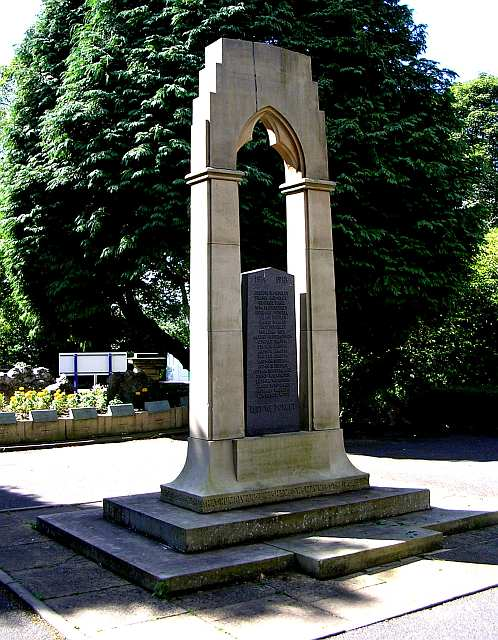
War Memorial

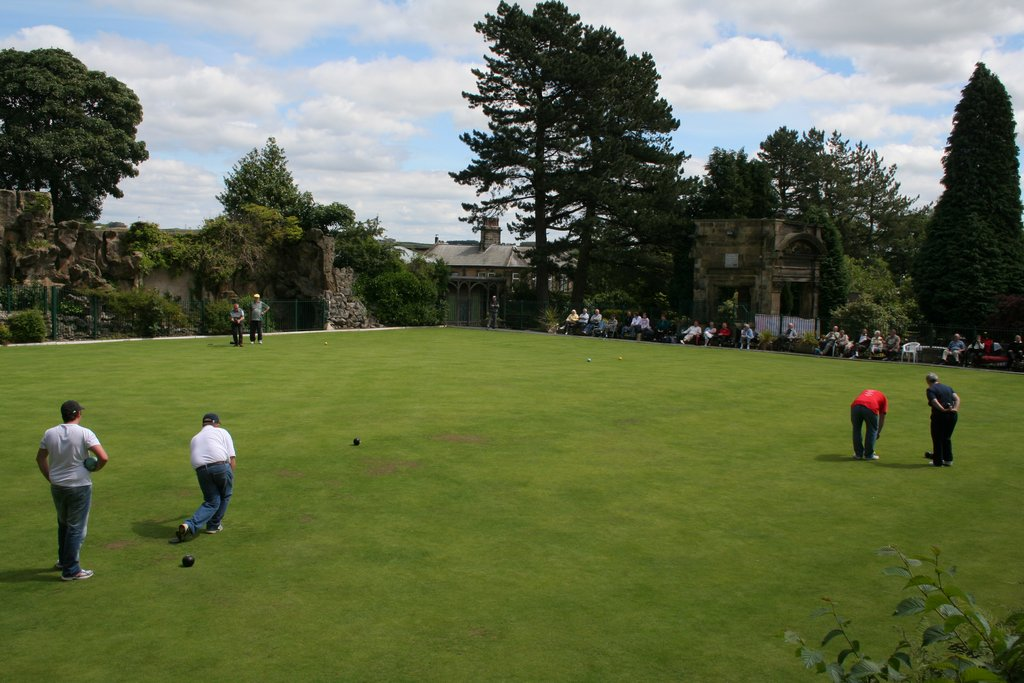
Crown Green Bowling

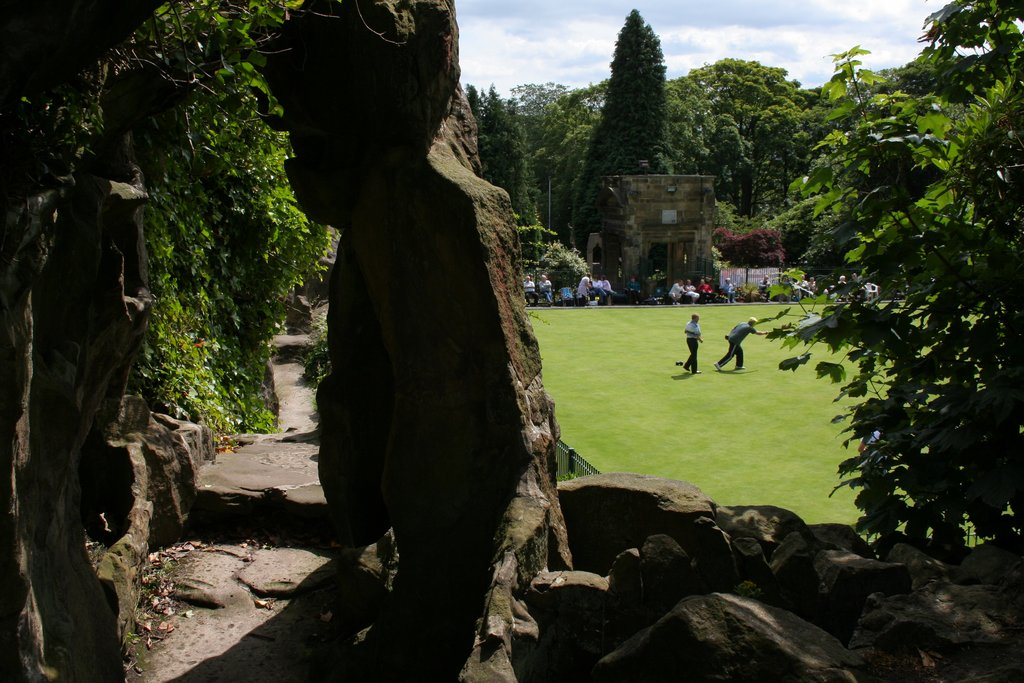
Elevated walkway

== See also ==
- Oakworth
- Oakworth Hall
- Brontë Country
