= Jacqueline S. Moore =

American poet and author

Mary Jacqueline Simon Moore
- Born: March 19, 1926; Hannibal, Missouri, US
- Died: April 11, 2002 (aged 76); Strasburg, Virginia, US
- Education: Middlebury College
- Occupations: Chemist; Housewife; Poet

Jacqueline S. Moore (March 19, 1926 – April 11, 2002), often known as Jackie Moore, was an American poet and author of Moments of My Life, a book of poems from her youth through her life including many inspired by her struggle with Parkinson's disease.

Jackie was a Middlebury College, Vermont graduate. She retired from E.I. DuPont where she was employed as a chemist during World War II.

Article:Why Write Poetry
