= Rowland Williams (theologian) =

Welsh theologian (1817–1870)

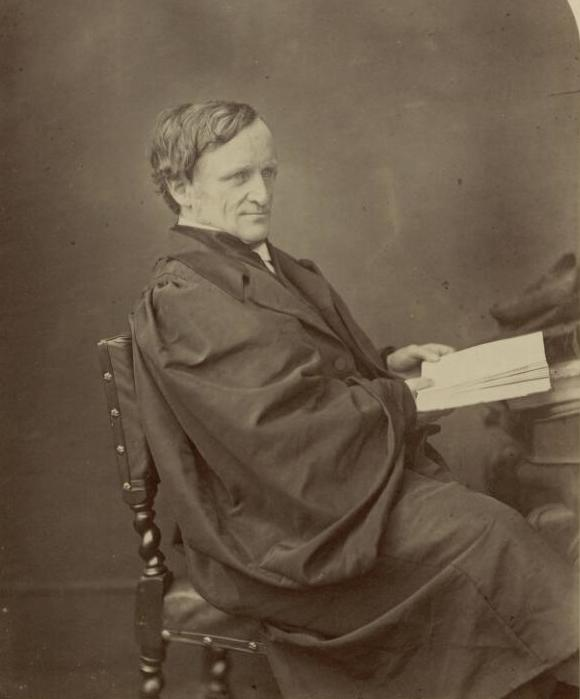
Rowland Williams

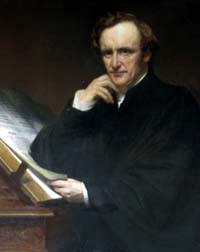
Reverend Professor Rowland Williams

Rowland Williams (16 August 1817 – 18 January 1870) was a Welsh theologian and educationalist. He was vice-principal and Professor of Hebrew at St David's College, Lampeter, from 1849 to 1862 and one of the most influential theologians of the nineteenth century. He supported biblical criticism and pioneered comparative religious studies in Britain. He was also a priest in the Church of England, and the vicar of Broad Chalke in Wiltshire, where he is buried. Williams is also credited with introducing rugby football to Wales; Lampeter's team was the first to be established in the nation.

== Early life ==
Williams was the son of the Welsh clergyman and writer Rowland Williams (d. 1854). He was born at Halkyn, Flintshire and educated at Eton and then King's College Cambridge. Following in his father's footsteps, he was ordained deacon in 1842 and priest in 1843. He was classical tutor of King's College for eight years; at this time he developed an interest in oriental studies. In 1848 he was awarded a university prize for a dissertation which compared Christianity and Hinduism. He was appointed vice-principal and Professor of Hebrew at St David's College, Lampeter in 1850. There he worked hard to improve the conditions and standards of the college. At this point, he was thought likely to become the first truly Welsh bishop in Wales for almost two centuries.

== Theological controversy ==
In December 1854, as select preacher in Cambridge, Williams delivered a course of sermons, entitled 'Rational godliness.' He argued that everything that was doubtful in the Bible could be surrendered, with little or no disadvantage to Christian essentials. Williams's views were regarded as not altogether orthodox, although the work appears fairly conservative to later generations. In 1855 the bishop of Llandaff forced him to resign his post as examining chaplain in his diocese. Williams attempted to defend his views in Lampeter theology, but this only made matters worse. He then published Christianity and Hinduism, an extended version of his submission for the Cambridge prize. In the dialogue, three Europeans and three Hindus present their views. The younger Christian interlocutor, Blancombe, is generally thought to represent Williams's own opinions.

== Essays and reviews ==
Williams contributed a review of Baron von Bunsen's Biblical researches to Essays and Reviews, published in 1860. Williams commended the critical approach to the Bible, which was already established in Germany. He advocated a more acceptable interpretation of some Christian doctrines, for instance arguing that atonement should be understood as 'salvation from evil through sharing the Saviour's spirit' not as 'purchase from God through the price of his bodily pangs'. Williams compared those opposed to the new biblical criticism to "degenerate senators before Tiberius." Williams was tried and condemned for heresy in the Court of Arches, together with Henry Bristow Wilson, the editor of Essays and reviews. Both had been accused of denying the inspiration of scripture. Their acquittal, on appeal to the Judicial Committee of the Privy Council, afforded a valuable protection to liberty of thought within the Church of England.

== Later years ==
In 1859 Williams married Ellen, daughter of Charles Cotesworth RN, a Liverpool merchant. The couple had no children. Williams left Lampeter for Broad Chalke, near Salisbury, in June 1862. He had accepted the living there in 1858 and was to stay there for the rest of his life. He is buried in Broad Chalke; there is a memorial window to him in the church. Lord Elis-Thomas, Presiding Officer of the National Assembly for Wales, opened a new research centre at the University of Wales, Lampeter, on Friday 8 April 2005, named in honour of Williams: The Rowland Williams Research Centre for Theology and Religion. In attendance at the first conference were three great-great nephews of Rowland Williams.

== Notes ==
Academic offices
Preceded by Edward Harold Browne	Vice-principal of St Davids College, Lampeter; 1850–1862	Succeeded by John James Stewart Perowne
