= John More (died 1583) =

English politician

John More (died 1583), from Worcester, was an English politician.

He was a member (MP) of the parliament of England for Worcester in 1563.
