= John Moore (Manx poet) =

Manx poet and privateer

John Moore was a Manx language poet, merchant seaman, and privateer during the American Revolutionary War. Originally from Camlork, in Braddan, Isle of Man, Moore later settled in Bride, where he owned an inn and pub. It was here that he came to be known as “John the Tiger” due to his often singing his song describing his role in as the cause of the privateer The Tiger.

== Voyage of The Tiger ==
In 1778 Moore was appointed lieutenant on “The Tiger”, a ship collectively owned by a number of Manx merchants. This venture was set up in order to take advantage of the British admiralty's invitation for merchant ships to arm themselves and engage in commerce raiding against enemy shipping, during the war against the Kingdom of France and the United States. The ship had a crew of 70 men, 25 of whom were able seamen, and carried 16 guns.

The ship set sail from Ramsey in December 1778, bound for Kingston, Jamaica. However, only at off Land's End, the ship was damaged in a storm. Once repaired, the Tiger captured a foreign ship and returned to a jubilant reception in Douglas. However, it was then discovered that the ship, "De Jonge Jessie Wittween de Lemmer", was Dutch, not French or of any other nationality at war with Britain. The owners of the Tiger were then ordered to pay the Dutch captain £60 in compensation and the expenses of £45 8s. 8d. that were incurred over the following month as the Dutch ship remained in Douglas refitting until mid-February.

The Tiger launched again in the summer but after only three days at sea, the ship ran in with the British fleet near the Isles of Scilly. Captain Johnstone, of the Romney, then commandeered for the navy all of the able seaman on board the Tiger. Richard Qualtrough, the captain of the Tiger, having thus lost the pick of his crew, was unable to navigate the ship properly, and so he returned to Douglas.

Having incurred significant costs but not gain, the owners tried to sell the Tiger, but, having bought it for £3,465, they could only find a buyer for £1,260, thus furthering their losses. They filed a lawsuit against Captain Johnstone, for the loss of earnings brought about by his taking of the ship's crew, but it is not recorded what the result of the case was.

== Poetry ==
In the history of Manx literature, Moore is attributed with having written a number of carvals (Manx carols), including 'Carval yn Noo Paul' ('Carol on St Paul') and 'My Vraar deyr graihagh, tar ayns shee' ('My dearly beloved brother, come in peace'), collected in Carvalyn Gailckagh ('Manx Carols') by A. W. Moore in 1891.

However, Moore is best remembered for his recounting of the story of the Tiger through his poem, 'Marrinys Yn Tiger' ('The Voyage of the Tiger'), dated as written in 1779. The poem is notable for omitting entirely the second voyage (perhaps because Moore did not sail a second time on the ship) and for the more social setting given to the sailors who signed up for the Tiger (including farmers in their absence worrying over who would do the ploughing and women worrying over not having enough men for husbands). The poem ends with a notable address to the Manx people:

Marrinys Yn Tiger / The Voyage of the Tiger [extract]
Ga va shin sheshaght ghennal, As trean ayns corp as cree, Drogh choyrle as drogh leeideillee Ver naardey cooish erbee. Ta'n foill ta geiyrt da'n Vanninagh, Oyr treihys fer-ny-ghah, Te'h creeney lurg laa'n vargee Agh s'beg vondeish te da. O shiuish my gheiney cheerey Ta geaishtagh rish m'arrane, My choyrle te diu ve creeney, Choud's ta'n traa er-mayrn. She'n chooish ta ooilley Ihie er, Dy ghoaill kiarail ayns traa, Roish bee laa'n vargee harrish, Nyn drimshey son dy braa.	Though we were a happy band And valiant in body and heart, Bad counsel and bad leaders Will bring to nothing any cause, The fault that follows the Manxman A cause of grief for one or two He's wise after the market day But little advantage it is to him, O you my countrymen Who are listening to my song, My advice to you is to be wise Whilst there's time remaining It's the thing that everything depends on To watch out in time Before the market day will be over Our sorrow for ever.
