= Harry Bristow Wilson =

English antiquarian

- Born: 23 August 1774
- Died: 21 November 1853 (aged 79)
- Occupation: Antiquarian

Harry Bristow Wilson (23 August 1774 – 21 November 1853) was an English antiquarian.

== Biography ==
Wilson was born on 23 August 1774, was a son of William Wilson of the parish of St. Gregory, London. He left Merchant Taylors' school in 1792, and was admitted commoner of Lincoln College, Oxford, on 12 Feb. 1793. Elected scholar on the Trappes foundation in the following year (30 June), he graduated B.A. on 10 Oct. 1796, and M.A. on 23 May 1799. He proceeded B.D. on 21 June 1810, and D.D. on 14 Jan. 1818. In February 1798, he became third master at Merchant Taylors', and from 1805 to 1824 was second master. He became curate and lecturer of St. Michael's Bassishaw, and lecturer of St. Matthias and St. John the Baptist, London, in 1807, and in 1814 received in addition the Townsend lecturership at St. Michael's, Crooked Lane. On 2 August 1816 he was collated by Archbishop Manners-Sutton to the united parishes of St. Mary Aldermary and St. Thomas the Apostle. There he was continually involved in litigation with his parishioners. But in spite of these differences he established a parochial lending library, and abolished fees for baptism.

Wilson was a learned adherent of the evangelical school, with more of the scholar than the divine. His chief theological works were a pamphlet against the catholic claims (‘An Earnest Address respecting the Catholics,’ 1807, 8vo), and a volume of sermons issued the same year. But he published some valuable antiquarian books. The chief of these was his ‘History of Merchant Taylors' School,’ issued in two quarto parts in 1812 and 1814 respectively. He received a subsidy from the company of 100l. towards the expenses of publication. The work is scholarly, if somewhat diffuse.

In 1831 Wilson published another quarto on ‘the History of the Parish of St. Laurence Pountney, including four documents unpublished, an account of Corpus Christi or Pountney College,’ within which Merchant Taylors' school was established in 1561. The work remained unfinished on account of the expenses in which Wilson's litigation involved him.

Wilson also published: ‘Observations on the Law and Practice of the Sequestration of Ecclesiastical Benefices,’ 1836, 8vo; and ‘Brief Notices of the Fabric and Glebe of St. Mary Aldermary,’ 1840, 8vo. The copy of the latter work in the British Museum contains an autograph letter by the author.

He died on 21 November 1853. He married Mary Anne, daughter of John Moore (1742–1821), by whom he had two sons and a daughter. The elder son, Henry Bristow Wilson, is separately noticed.
