= John P. Moore =

Researcher

John P. Moore is an American virologist and professor at Cornell University's Weill Cornell Medicine college, known for his research on HIV/AIDS. He previously worked at the Aaron Diamond AIDS Research Center. A former section editor of the Journal of General Virology, he is an outspoken critic of HIV/AIDS denialism, including the work of Peter Duesberg.
