= Henry Bristow Wilson =

Henry Bristow Wilson (1803–1888) was a theologian and a fellow of St John's College, Oxford.

== Life ==
Born on 10 June 1803, he was elder son of Harry Bristow Wilson, by his wife Mary Anne, daughter of John Moore. He entered Merchant Taylors' School in October 1809, and was elected to St John's College, Oxford, in 1821. Matriculating on 25 June 1821, he graduated B.A. in 1825, M.A. in 1829, and B.D. in 1834, and received a fellowship in 1825, which he retained until 1850. In 1831 he was appointed dean of arts, and he acted as tutor from 1833 to 1835. He was Rawlinsonian Professor of Anglo-Saxon at Oxford from 1839 to 1844. In 1850 he was presented by St John's College to the vicarage of Great Staughton in Huntingdonshire, which he retained until his death.

In the spring of 1841 Wilson joined Archibald Campbell Tait in the ‘protest of the four tutors’ against John Henry Newman's Tract XC. In the Lent term of 1851 he delivered the Bampton Lectures, taking as his subject ‘The Communion of the Saints: an Attempt to illustrate the True Principles of Christian Union’ (Oxford, 1851). His lectures hinted a greater freedom in theological enquiry. Widening of theological opinions and of the Christian communion became the main interest of his life.

In 1857 he contributed ‘Schemes of Christian Comprehension’ to ‘Oxford Essays,’ and then in 1861 he published a dissertation on ‘The National Church’ in Essays and Reviews. Passages in the latter essay provoked a heresy action against Wilson – John William Burgon was especially dissatisfied with his views – in the Court of Arches. On 25 June 1862 Wilson, whose case was tried together with that of Rowland Williams, was found guilty on three out of eight of the articles brought against him, and was sentenced to suspension for a year by the Dean of Arches, Stephen Lushington. Wilson and Williams both appealed to the Judicial Committee of the Privy Council, and their appeals were heard together in 1863. Wilson's defence occupied 19 and 20 June, and was later published. The appeal was successful, and on 8 February 1864 the judicial committee reversed Lushington's decision. Wilson, however never completely recovered from the strain. During later life he did not reside in his benefice. He died at 1 Lawn Villas, Eltham Road, Lee, on 10 August 1888.

Wilson wrote an introduction to ‘A Brief Examination of prevalent Opinions on the Inspiration of the Old and New Testaments’ (London, 1861).
