= John Marion More =

American miner and city founder (1830–1868)

- Born: 1830; Anderson County, Tennessee, United States
- Died: 1868 (aged 37–38); Silver City, Idaho, United States
- Known for: Founder of Idaho City

John Marion More was an American miner, best known for being the founder of Idaho City, Idaho.

== Early life ==
More was born in Anderson County, Tennessee to Joseph Carter Moore and his first wife, Jane Pate. Around the age of 20 More moved west and settled in Mariposa, California. He served as under-sheriff of Mariposa to sheriff Thomas Early in 1856 and 1857. He then moved to Walla Walla, Washington where he first learned of the mining opportunity a hundred miles to the south at Florence, in Salmon River country.

== Career ==
In 1862 More was a member of the Splawn-Grimes discovery party and he went on to establish Bannock City on October 7. The city would be renamed in December 1863 to Idaho City by the new Idaho Territorial Legislature to avoid confusion with Bannack, Montana. He would become very wealthy from his prospecting and eventually would own several mines around Idaho City. That same year, More was back in southern Idaho, expanding his Boise Basin operations and building up capital. With his old friend Fogus, More invested heavily in the Owyhee mines. By the spring of 1864, the two partners had bought up controlling interest in two promising quartz properties: the Morning Star and the Oro Fino. By 1865, More and Fogus properties had recovered about $1 million in revenue. However, in 1866 the debts began to overcome the proceeds, mainly due to Fogus investing in many side projects.

== Death ==
In 1868 during the peak of the Owyhee Mine War, More was out drinking with friends in Silver City, Idaho. More generally struggled with drink and afterwards he confronted rival miner Sam Lockhart in the street. The two exchanged words, and even though More was unarmed, he was carrying a rough cane. He lifted the cane as if he was about to strike Lockhart. Lockhart retreated quickly and shot More in the chest. More walked 50 yards down the street before collapsing. His last words were to John R. McBride, chief justice of the Territorial Supreme Court: "They have stolen the mine and now their man Lockhart has killed me".
