= John Francis Moore (sculptor) =

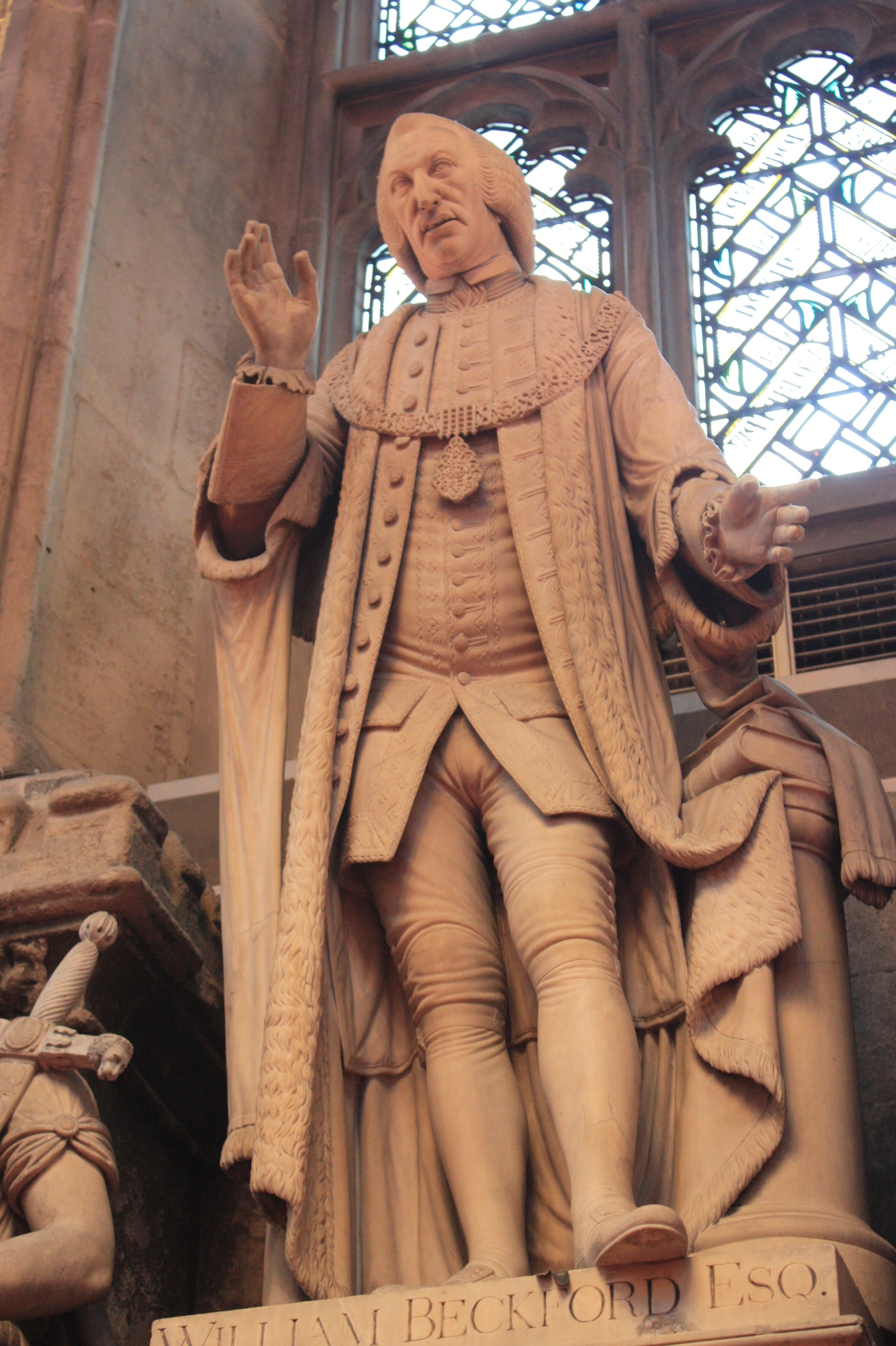
Statue of William Beckford atop the huge monument in his memory, Guildhall, London, by John Francis Moore

John Francis Moore (died 1809) was a sculptor who was active in late 18th century Britain. His works include two memorials in Westminster Abbey.

== Life ==
Moore was of British extraction but was born in Hanover, Germany around 1725. While he was presumably raised and educated in Germany he moved to Britain around 1760. In 1766 his first presentation to the Society of Arts is noted: a relief sculpture entitled Britannia Reviver of Antique, Prompter to Modern Art.

Moore was married to Mary, only daughter and sole heir of John Early (d.1748), a corn chandler and proprietor, by whom he had three sons, John Francis, Charles and James (d.1816) and three daughters, Maria Teresa, Elizabeth Ann and Frances Agnes.

His eldest son, John Francis Moore the younger (d.1793) was also a sculptor but of lesser note. He died young and his father thereafter went into partnership with a 'J. Smith' from 1790 onwards. Moore's youngest sons followed their father's artistic career and became painters.

Moore's granddaughter Elizabeth Moore (1791-1864) of Leyton, Essex was married to Lord Mayor of London and wine merchant John Kinnersley Hooper (1791-1854).

Moore died on 21 January 1809 at Wells Street off Oxford Street, London.

== Works ==
see

- Monument to Benedict Conquest, Irnham (1753)
- Monument to Winfrid Bridger, St Mildreds, Canterbury (1757)
- Several chimney-pieces for Audley End House (1761)
- Monument to James Brockman, Newington, Kent (1767)
- Monument to Faith Sawrey, Bradford Cathedral 1767)
- Statue of William Beckford Lord Mayor of London (1767) designed for Fonthill, now in the Company of Ironmongers, London
- Statue of Apollo (1769) location unknown
- Bust of Sir Henry Rushout, Worcester Infirmary (1769)
- Monument to William Baker, Bath Abbey (1770)
- Monument to Robert Hucks, Aldenham (1771)
- Huge monument to William Beckford Lord Mayor of London (1772) Guildhall, London
- Monument to Margaret Rae, Worcester Cathedral (1772)
- Monument to Thomas Patten, Warrington Parish Church (1772)
- Monument to Lord Ligonier, Westminster Abbey (1773)
- Monument to the Rushout family, Blockley (1775) including additional figures by Michael Rysbrack
- Statuary group: Mr Shirley flanked by Lord and Lady Ferrers at Ettington (1775)
- Statue of Mrs Macaulay, St Stephen's, Walbrook (1778) (removed)
- Monument to Lord Hawke, North Stoneham (1781)
- Monument to Rev. Thomas, St Stephen's, Walbrook (1784)
- Monument to Jonas Hanway, Westminster Abbey (1786)
- Monument to Charles Wolfran Cornwall, Holy Cross, Winchester (1789)
- Monument to John and Maria Chichester, Arlington, Devon (1791)
- Monument to Joseph Blunt, Mapledurham (1793)
- Monument to Thomas Wildman, Twickenham Parish Church (1795)
- Monument to Peter Oliver, Marylebone Chapel, London (1795)
- Monument to Barbara, Countess of Scarborough, Marylebone Chapel (1797)
- Monument to Lady Maria Churchill, Lewisham Parish Church (1801)
