= John Moore (Baptist) =

English Baptist minister (1662–1726)

John Moore (1662–1726) was an English Baptist minister in Northampton. Member of the Baptist church at Rossendale, he was pastor at the College Street church, Northampton, from 1720 to 1726.

He published a collection of selected sermons in 1722. This was supplemented and re-published in 1854 as "Several Sermons by John Moore of Northampton." He died on 14 January 1726.
