= John Moore (anarchist) =

British anarchist author, teacher and organiser

- Born: 25 December 1957
- Died: 27 October 2002 (aged 44)
- Occupation(s): Author, teacher
- Notable work: "A Primitivist Primer"

John Moore (25 December 1957 – 27 October 2002) was a British anarchist author, teacher, and organiser.

A member of the Anarchist Research Group in London in the 1980s, he was one of the main theorists of the pro-Situ anarchism of the 1990s (most commonly associated with Hakim Bey), and was attracted to anarcho-primitivism in particular; his best-known work is the essay "A Primitivist Primer." Despite the heavy influence of theorist Fredy Perlman, Moore later turned to theorists of language and subjectivity, such as Julia Kristeva, Friedrich Nietzsche and Max Stirner.

Moore died of a heart attack after collapsing on his way to work as a creative writing lecturer at the University of Luton (now the University of Bedfordshire).

== Works ==
During his lifetime he published several short books: Anarchy and Ecstasy, Lovebite, and The Book of Levelling. An anthology he was working on at the time of his death, I Am Not a Man, I Am Dynamite! Friedrich Nietzsche and the Anarchist Tradition, was completed by Spencer Sunshine and published posthumously by Autonomedia in 2004 (ISBN 1-57027-121-6).
