= Will no one rid me of this turbulent priest? =

1170 quote prompting Thomas Becket's killing

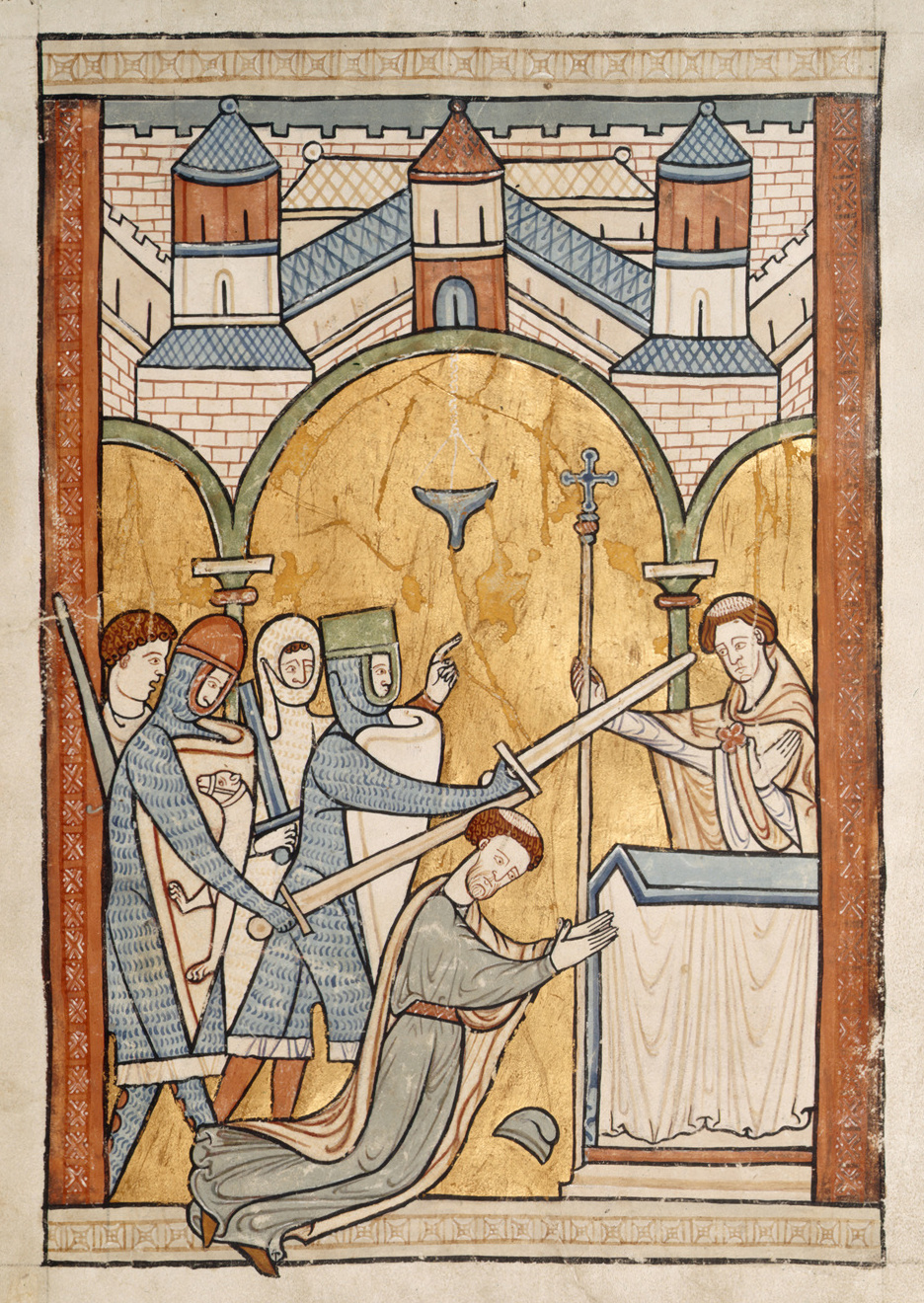
A 13th-century manuscript illumination, the earliest known depiction of Thomas Becket's assassination in Canterbury Cathedral (c. 1200)

"Will no one rid me of this turbulent priest?" (spoken aloud; also expressed as "troublesome priest" or "meddlesome priest") is a quote attributed to Henry II of England preceding the death of Thomas Becket, the Archbishop of Canterbury, in 1170. While the quote was not expressed as an order, it prompted four knights to travel from Normandy to Canterbury, where they killed Becket due to an ongoing dispute between crown and church. The phrase is commonly used in modern-day contexts to express that a ruler's wish may be interpreted as a command by their subordinates. It is also commonly understood as shorthand for any rhetorical device allowing leaders to covertly order or exhort violence among their followers, while still being able to claim plausible deniability for political, legal, or other reasons.

== Origin ==
Henry made the outburst on Christmas 1170 at his castle at Bures, Normandy, at the height of the Becket controversy. He had just been informed that Becket had excommunicated a number of bishops supportive of the king, including the Archbishop of York. Edward Grim, who was present at Becket's murder and subsequently wrote the Life of St. Thomas, quotes Henry as saying:

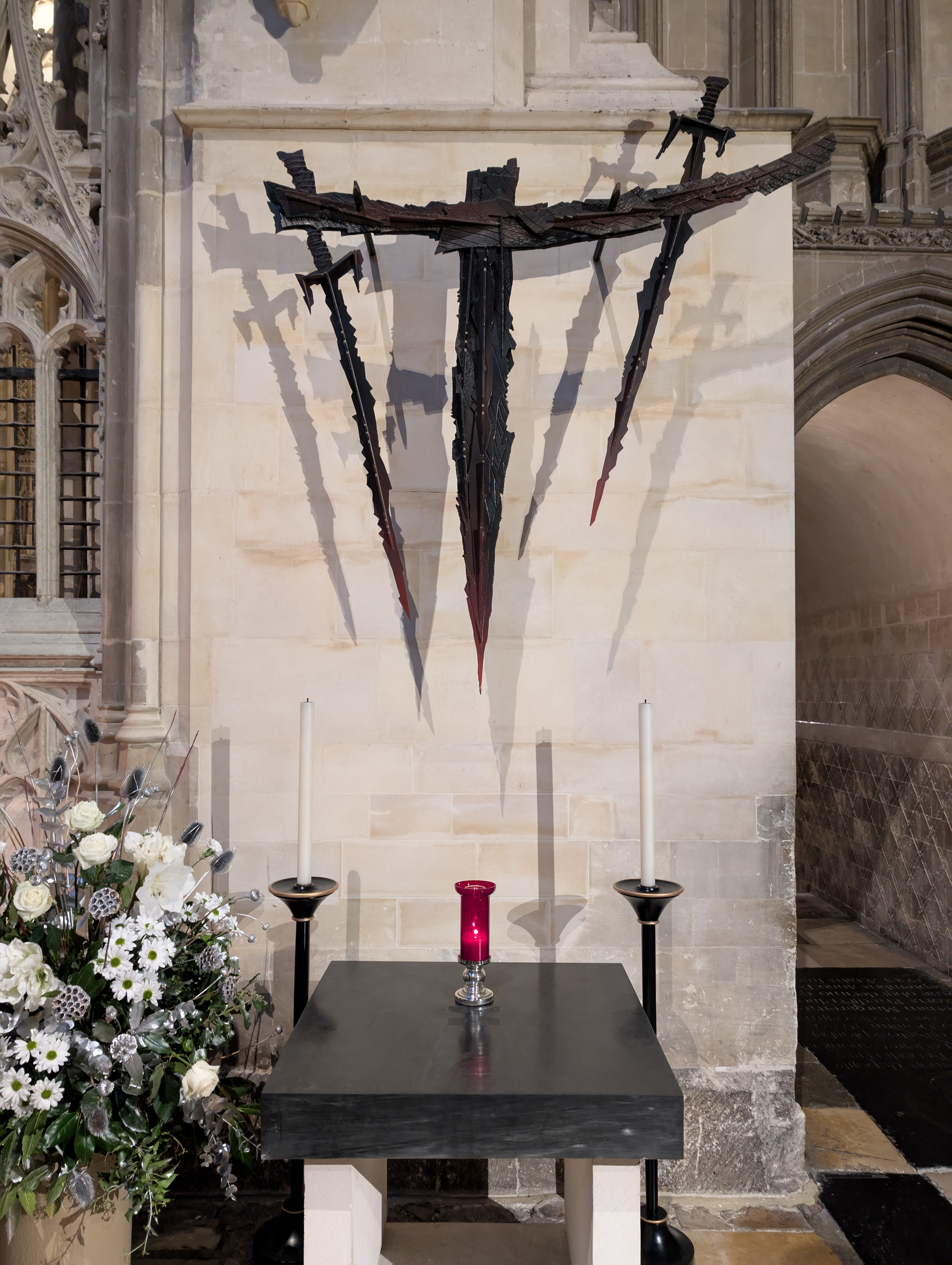
Memorial at Canterbury Cathedral marking the site of Archbishop Thomas Becket's assassination in 1170

What miserable drones and traitors have I nourished and promoted in my household, who let their lord be treated with such shameful contempt by a low-born clerk!

The popular version of the phrase was first used in 1740 by the author and bookseller Robert Dodsley, in his Chronicle of the Kings of England, where he described Henry II's words as follows: "O wretched Man that I am, who shall deliver me from this turbulent priest?" This was modelled on Romans 7:24: "O wretched man that I am! who shall deliver me from the body of this death?" A similar version of the phrase was later used in George Lyttleton's 1772 History of the Life of King Henry the Second, where the quote is rendered as "[he said] that he was very unfortunate to have maintained so many cowardly and ungrateful men in his court, none of whom would revenge him of the injuries he sustained from one turbulent priest." In The Chronicle of the Kings of England (1821), it becomes "Will none of these lazy insignificant persons, whom I maintain, deliver me from this turbulent priest?", which is then shortened to "who shall deliver me from this turbulent priest?"

In Jean Anouilh's 1959 play Becket, Henry says, "Will no one rid me of him? A priest! A priest who jeers at me and does me injury." In the 1964 film Becket, which was based on the Anouilh play, Henry says, "Will no one rid me of this meddlesome priest?"

There are likely several English iterations of Henry II's original quote because it had to be translated; Henry, though he understood many languages, spoke only Latin and French.

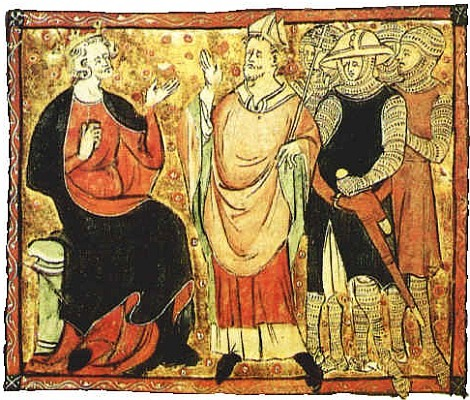
14th-century depiction of King Henry II of England with Archbishop of Canterbury Thomas Becket

== Consequences ==
Reportedly, upon hearing the king's words, four knights—Reginald Fitzurse, Hugh de Morville, William de Tracy and Richard le Breton—travelled from Normandy to Canterbury with the intention of forcing Becket to withdraw his excommunication, or, alternatively, taking him back to Normandy by force. The day after their arrival, they confronted Becket in Canterbury Cathedral. When Becket resisted their attempts to seize him, they slashed at him with their swords, killing him. Although nobody, even at the time, believed that Henry directly ordered that Becket be killed, his words had started a chain of events that was likely to have such a result. Moreover, as Henry's harangue had been directed not at Becket, but at his own household, the four probably thought that a failure to act would be regarded as treachery, potentially punishable by death.

Following the murder, Becket was venerated and Henry was vilified. There were demands that the king be excommunicated. Pope Alexander forbade Henry to hear Mass until he had expiated his sin. In May 1172, Henry did public penance in Avranches Cathedral.

The four knights subsequently fled to Scotland and from there to Knaresborough Castle in Yorkshire. All four were excommunicated by Pope Alexander in 1171 during Easter and ordered to undertake penitentiary pilgrimages to the Holy Land for 14 years.

== Use and analysis ==
The Turbulent Priest was the title of Piers Compton's 1957 biography of Becket.

According to Alfred H. Knight, the phrase "had profound long-term consequences for the development of constitutional law" because its consequences forced the king to accept the benefit of clergy, the principle that secular courts had no jurisdiction over clergy.

It has been said that the phrase is an example of "direction via indirection", in that it provides the speaker with plausible deniability when a crime is committed as a result of their words.

The New York Times commented that even though Henry might not actually have said the words, "in such matters historical authenticity may not be the point". The phrase has been cited as an example of the shared history with which all British citizens should be familiar, as part of "the collective memory of their country".

In a 2009 BBC documentary on the Satanic Verses controversy, journalist and newsreader Peter Sissons described a February 1989 interview with the Iranian chargé d'affaires in London, Mohammad Mehdi Akhondzadeh Basti. The position of the Iranian government was that the fatwa against Salman Rushdie declared by Iran's Supreme Leader Ayatollah Khomeini was "an opinion". Sissons described this argument as being "a bit like the, 'who will rid me of this turbulent priest', isn't it?"

In a 2017 appearance before the Senate Intelligence Committee, former FBI director James Comey testified that US President Donald Trump had told him that he "hoped" Comey could "let go" of any investigation into Michael Flynn; when asked if he would take "I hope", coming from the president, as a directive, Comey answered, "Yes. It rings in my ears as kind of 'Will no one rid me of this meddlesome priest?'"

== In popular culture ==
In "The Archbishop", a 1983 episode of the British television comedy series Blackadder, two knights overhearing King Richard IV quote the phrase, which they misconstrue as a directive to assassinate the main character.

In the final episode of the 1988 television series A Very British Coup these words are spoken by the Director General of MI5 in reference to Harry Perkins, a left wing prime minister and trade unionist.

In 2011, it was quoted by innkeeper Samuel Quested in Midsomer Murders ("The Night of the Stag", 2011) as a slightly veiled invitation to kill the local vicar.

In an August 2023 opinion piece in The New York Times, Maureen Dowd refers to former President Donald Trump's "'Who will rid me of this meddlesome democracy?' plot".

U.S. District Judge Tanya Chutkan mentioned the quote during the October 2023 hearing in the criminal case concerning Donald Trump's role in the attempts to overturn the 2020 United States presidential election.

In March 2026, U.S. District Judge James Boasberg paraphrased the phrase in an order quashing grand jury subpoenas issued against the Federal Reserve Board of Governors as part of an investigation into Federal Reserve chair Jerome Powell, writing that President Donald Trump "spent years essentially asking if no one will rid him of this troublesome Fed Chair."

== See also ==
- Stochastic terrorism
- Plausible deniability – Ability to credibly deny responsibility or involvement
