= Four Nights in Knaresborough =

1999 play by Paul Corcoran

- Original language: English
- Written by: Paul Webb
- Subject: The aftermath of the murder of Thomas Becket
- Genre: Historical fiction
- Setting: Knaresborough Castle, 1171

Premiere
- Date: November 1999
- Place: Tricycle Theatre, London

Four Nights in Knaresborough is a play written by Paul Corcoran (now known as Paul Webb) and first performed at the Tricycle Theatre, London, in 1999. It recounts the aftermath of the murder of Thomas Becket by four knights making "the worst career choice in history". Despite being an historical drama, the play uses modern language, including an abundance of profanity and slang.

A film version of the play, scripted by Webb and titled Four Knights is to be produced by The Weinstein Company, directed by Paul McGuigan.

== Characters ==
- Brito, a knight
- Fitz, a knight
- Morville, a knight
- Traci, a knight
- Catherine, a house-keeper at Knaresborough Castle
- Becket, the Archbishop of Canterbury
- John, a visitor to the castle
- Wigmore, a local farmer

== Plot ==
Set in 1171, Four Nights in Knaresborough opens in Canterbury Cathedral where four knights, Brito, Fitz, Morville and Traci, come to arrest Becket, the Archbishop of Canterbury. However, rather than arresting him, Becket is killed by Fitz. The knights then flee to Knaresborough Castle in Yorkshire where they ensconce themselves for a year to avoid the wrath of the public and the Pope.

Over the course of four evenings, in January, March, September and December, the play portrays the gradual decline of the knights, showing their repressed desires, fears and misgivings. Emphasising clashes of personalities, the play glosses over the deeper political and historical consequences of the murder.

Of the four knights, Morville is the one most upset by his excommunication and isolation and argues that Becket had to die as he was opposing the progressive reforms of King Henry II. He even claims that Henry is playing a careful political game but is really on the knights' side.

Brito is not an aristocrat like the other knights, but is rather a "new man" who joined the others less out of conviction than of opportunism. As the most active and the youngest of the four knights, his imprisonment is a kind of rite of passage and he grows through the play. Brito is also rampantly heterosexual and, despite a mutual attraction between himself and Traci, he chases Catherine and ultimately martyrs himself for her when she succumbs to a fatal disease circulating the village of Knaresborough.

Traci is the most complex character in the play. Guilt-ridden like Morville, he is also in love with Brito. In the past he has had a relationship with the fourth knight, the aristocratic Fitz, but is now very much alone.

While the knights wait out their time in the castle, Catherine keeps the villagers at bay by assuring them that her tenants are seeking penance through a constant cycle of fasting and prayer. Ultimately, she is tried as a witch by water.

== History ==
Four Nights in Knaresborough was the first play written by Paul Corcoran (now Paul Webb) and is the only one of his theatrical works to have been performed, receiving its premiere at the Tricycle Theatre, London in 1999. This production suffered financial difficulties and director, Richard Wilson, had to put his own salary for the job back into the production to make it happen.

== Productions ==
Since its premiere in 1999, there have been a number of additional notable productions of Four Nights in Knaresborough across the United Kingdom.

Premiere. Tricycle Theatre, London, November – December 1999

- Cast: Jonny Lee Miller, James Purefoy, Martin Marquez, Christopher Fulford, Mali Harries, Alan Parnaby
- Director: Richard Wilson

UK tour, Autumn 2001

- Cast: Nick Moran, Robert Cavanah, Tim Dantay, Joseph Millson, Joy Brook
- Director: Paul Miller

Traverse Theatre, Scottish Premiere, Edinburgh, 2004

- Cast: Malcolm Hamilton, Adam Tomkins, Kevin MacIsaac, James Sutherland, Keith Hutcheon
- Director: Sean Kane

Riverside Studios, London, 23 March – 17 April 2005

- Cast: Demetri Alexander, Ken Bradshaw, Piers Ronan, Peter-Hugo Daly, Juliet Howland
- Director: Peter Farago

== Reception ==
Reviews of Four Nights in Knaresborough have been very mixed. In reviewing the premiere, The Times said that the play was confused and did not know whether it was a tragedy of character, a straight historical dramatisation, a light comedy, a political-philosophical statement, or a satirical study of sexual longing. Nevertheless, the play sustained interest and it was felt that Webb could produce something remarkable with more discipline. The Guardian review of the premiere, in awarding the play 3 stars, found the play to be a lively debut and thought that Webb could be better if he stopped using four-letter words in an attempt to hold the audience's attention. Indeed, several reviewers have criticised the play's crude and tiresome references to wanking, and extended turd jokes.

The play's use of modern language and idiom has also received mixed reviews, drawing comparisons with Blackadder, A Knight's Tale and Reservoir Dogs. The Guardian felt that it was a good, if overused comic device, while The Times thought the language, while adding realism, made the play feel lightweight.

== Film adaptation ==
A film version of the play has been scripted by Webb. Titled Four Knights, it was produced by The Weinstein Company, directed by Paul McGuigan and produced by Laurence Bowen of UK-based production company Feelgood Fiction

Harvey Weinstein has told the director to think of the film as being like Young Guns. The screenplay is also reportedly full of action, with the knights always fleeing and being on the road.
