= Guernes de Pont-Sainte-Maxence =

Contemporary biographer of Saint Thomas Becket of Canterbury

Guernes de Pont-Sainte-Maxence, also known as Garnier, was a 12th-century French scribe and one of the ten contemporary biographers of Saint Thomas Becket of Canterbury.

== Life ==
All that is known about Guernes is what he tells us, directly or indirectly, through his sole text, Vie de Saint Thomas Becket. He was born in the small French town of Pont-Sainte-Maxence, and was a wandering Christian cleric with good command of Latin. Shortly after Thomas Becket's death in 1170, Guernes set out to compose a vernacular-French, biographical poem of Becket's life. He completed his first draft in 1172, working on the continent, but it was stolen before he could correct it. This first draft was compiled only from secondary sources and drew mainly on an earlier biography by Edward Grim, who witnessed Becket's death first hand and was wounded trying to save him. Guernes immediately started working on a second draft and, being a wandering cleric, went to England to interview the eyewitnesses of Becket's death in the Canterbury area. Guernes completed the text in 1174, drawing primarily on Edward Grim and William of Canterbury, and consulting Benedict of Peterborough and William Fitzstephen. Although Guernes did not personally know Becket, he tells us he saw him numerous times riding against the French. Whilst in England, Guernes also visited Thomas Becket's sister Mary at Barking Abbey (where she had been made abbess in recompense for her brother's murder) to interview her about Thomas's life. In the final lines of his Vie de Saint Thomas Becket, Guernes thanks Mary effusively for her help and hospitality.

== Vie de Saint Thomas Becket ==
Guernes's work is the earliest-known life of Becket written in French, and the earliest known verse life of Becket. There are six manuscripts of the second draft, all of them are Anglo-Norman and none of them older than the 13th-century. In 1977, Ian Short examined a fragment of the first draft which was assumed lost and noted that the second draft was far less influenced by Grim.

=== Form ===
The poem is composed of 6,180 lines grouped in 5-line, mono-rhymed stanzas, and the form is of a "dignified and serious alexandrine". It is written in vernacular French, slightly affected by Picard and Anglo-Norman. The Picardism comes from Pont-Sainte-Maxence's close proximity to Picardy, which Guernes downplays by highlighting that Pont-Sainte-Maxence is within France's boundaries, therefore his language is good. The poem is further coloured with hints of Anglo-Norman because it was copied by Anglo-Norman scribes. Guernes's language is relatively free of dialectal traits, and it has therefore been concluded that he wrote in the literary language of the period.

Both versions of Guernes's poem adopt a similar narrative structure to Edward Grim's biography of Becket, but Guernes also adapts his materials, adds to them and contributes his own opinions.

=== Style ===
The poem contains elements of two hagiographical genres: the heroic biography or Chansons de Geste, and the epic. There are several attempts at the epic technique of repetition, and Guernes also elegantly repeats the same word three or four times in differing senses. The Chansons de Geste genre is represented by heroics of Becket's death, how he "defied the enemy of Christ and perished a champion of the true faith". The poem was written in the vernacular and Guernes tells us he often read it beside Becket's tomb in the cathedral at Canterbury. In her introduction to her English translation, Janet Shirley describes the text as the following:

"It is a lively emphatic creation, written for quiet study but to be enjoyed by a listening audience… It was both a serious work and a tourist attraction."

Despite the desire to entertain, and the obvious hagiographical imperative of the poem, Guernes expressed his concern for truth through accuracy, which is reflected in his journalistic methods of compiling information.

=== Historical impact ===
"No story as good as this has ever been composed; it was made and corrected at Canterbury and contains nothing but the exact truth."
Conclusion, Vie de Sainte Thomas Becket

Vernacular-hagiography had a specific influence on the epic genre; it influenced the very conception of hero by "canonizing" figures like Charlemagne, Roland, Perceval, Lancelot and Galahad. Vie de Saint Thomas Becket was a forerunner in this field. It is also a forerunner in the hagiographical method of viewing the epic narrative structure as a means of presenting "myth truth", in which the poet treated the subject as a "real" myth and served the myth by presenting it as accurately as possible. This hagiographical attitude towards truth is in opposition to truth in the hagiographical works of the novelistic, romance structure, which adopts a preference towards "legend truth": true in moral implications but not necessarily factually provable or historically correct. Vie de Saint Thomas Becket is seen to adopt a myth perspective towards truth because of Guernes's preoccupation with accuracy. This preoccupation with accuracy is echoed into the 13th, 14th and 15th centuries in poems by St. Francis of Assisi, and in poetic biographies of St. Anthony Padua.

Vie de Saint Thomas Becket represents the forerunner in the hagiographical epic style because Guernes was one of the first to write about a contemporary, which freed him to focus on the historicity of his subject because he was already canonized; there was no need to overplay his saintliness. Modern critics have obscured the hagiographical elements through their general approval of its historicity.

== Bibliography ==
=== Articles ===
- O'Donnell, Thomas, "Anglo-Norman Multingualism and Continental Standards in Guernes de Pont-Sainte-Maxence's Vie de Saint Thomas," in Conceptualizing Multilingualism in England, 800-1250, ed. Elizabeth M. Tyler (Turnhout: Brepols Publishers, 2011), pp. 337-356.
- O'Donnell, Thomas, "'The ladies have made me quite fat': Authors and Patrons at Barking Abbey," in Barking Abbey and Medieval Literary Culture, ed. Donna A. Bussell and Jennifer N. Brown (Woodbridge: Boydell and Brewer, 2012), pp. 94-114.
- O'Reilly, Jennifer L., "The Double Martyrdom of Thomas Becket: Hagiography or History?" in Studies in Medieval and Renaissance History, (vol. 17, New York: AMS Press, 1985)
- Peters, Timothy, "An Ecclesiastical Epic: Garnier de Pont-Ste-Maxence's Vie de Saint Thomas le Martyr, Mediaevistik, 7, (1996): 181–202
- Peters, Timothy, "Elements of Chanson de Geste in an Old FrenchLife of Becket: Guernes's Vie de Saint Thomas le Martyr, Olifant 18,(1994):278–288

=== Books ===
- Shirley, Janet (1975). Garnier's Becket. London: Phillimore and Co. ISBN 0850332001.
- Short, Ian, A Life of Thomas Becket in Verse: La Vie de saint Thomas Becket by Guernes de Pont-Sainte-Maxence, Toronto: PIMS, 2013.
- Staunton, Michael, The Lives of Thomas Becket, Manchester University Press, Manchester: 2001
