= William of Canterbury =

12th-century English monk and writer

William of Canterbury (floruit 1170–1177) was a medieval English monk and biographer of Thomas Becket, the Archbishop of Canterbury murdered in December 1170. He was present at the murder of the archbishop and admitted in his writings that he ran from the murder scene. Later he collected miracle stories about Becket. He also wrote a hagiography, or saint's life, of Becket, one of five written at Canterbury soon after Becket's death. William's hagiography was later used by other medieval writers who wrote about Becket.

== Early career ==
Because of William's criticism of King Henry II's policy in Ireland, it has been suggested that William was from Ireland, although this is not known for certain.

William was a Benedictine monk at Christ Church Priory and was ordained as a deacon by Becket in 1170. According to Frank Barlow, a modern biographer of Becket, Becket sent William to Reginald, the Earl of Cornwall, in mid-December 1170 as a spy at the royal court, which Reginald was attending. Barlow then states that William was recognised by a royal servant as a member of Becket's household and Reginald sent William back to the archbishop and that William was back with Becket by 19 December 1170. But Anne Duggan, another modern historian studying Becket, believes Barlow has confused William of Canterbury with Becket's doctor, who was also named William, and that the deacon and biographer did not go to Reginald.

== Becket's murder ==
William was present at Becket's martyrdom, fleeing the scene after the attack on Becket began. William admitted in his writings that he fled to the choir of Canterbury Cathedral when the first blows were struck.

== Writings on Becket ==
William began to collect and edit the stories of miracles that happened at Becket's shrine in June 1172. Benedict of Peterborough who also recorded Becket's miracles during this time period. William was appointed to help with developing the shrine to Becket in Canterbury Cathedral in late July 1172. Parts of the collection were given to King Henry II, likely in late 1174 when the king performed his penance for his part in Becket's death. William's collection eventually became the largest such collection from medieval England. In his collection, William, unlike Benedict, related miracles of many types – including ones involving animals, others that involved medical cures, and those that dealt with the healing of madness or the resurrection of the dead. Some of his writings hint that he may have possessed some medical training, as many of his stories give medical details. The first six books of the collection were completed by about 1175, and after a break, William resumed working on it in 1176–1177. In the end, it related over 400 miracles that could be ascribed to Becket. Unlike Benedict of Peterborough's collection which was organised chronologically, Wiliam's collection was grouped by the category of miracle.

At the same time William presented the king with parts of the collection of miracles, William also composed a hagiography of Becket, completed around 1173 or 1174. This work is of great value to historians as it gives a first hand account of the events preceding the murder. This hagiography, or "life", has been called "the closest we have to an official Canterbury Life". It forms one of five biographies that can be grouped together into a "Canterbury Group" that were written by authors closely connected with Becket and Canterbury. It is likely that William was encouraged to write his work because of his eyewitness status to Becket's death. William's biography was written in Latin and is usually given the title of Vita et miracula S. Thomae Cantuariensis. It was edited by James Craigie Robertson and published in 1875 as part of the Rolls Series as well as in the Bibliotheca Hagiographica Latina from 1898 to 1901 as number 8184.

William appears to have read two others of the "Canterbury Group" works – the one conventionally called the "Anonymous II", as well as that written by Edward Grim. William's Vita in turn influenced a work by Guernes de Pont-Sainte-Maxence in French verse. The Vita was also included in a conflation of various biographies of Becket into the Quadrilogus II compiled about 1198 by Elias of Evesham at Crowland Abbey.
