= Richard le Breton =

12th-century Anglo-Norman nobleman

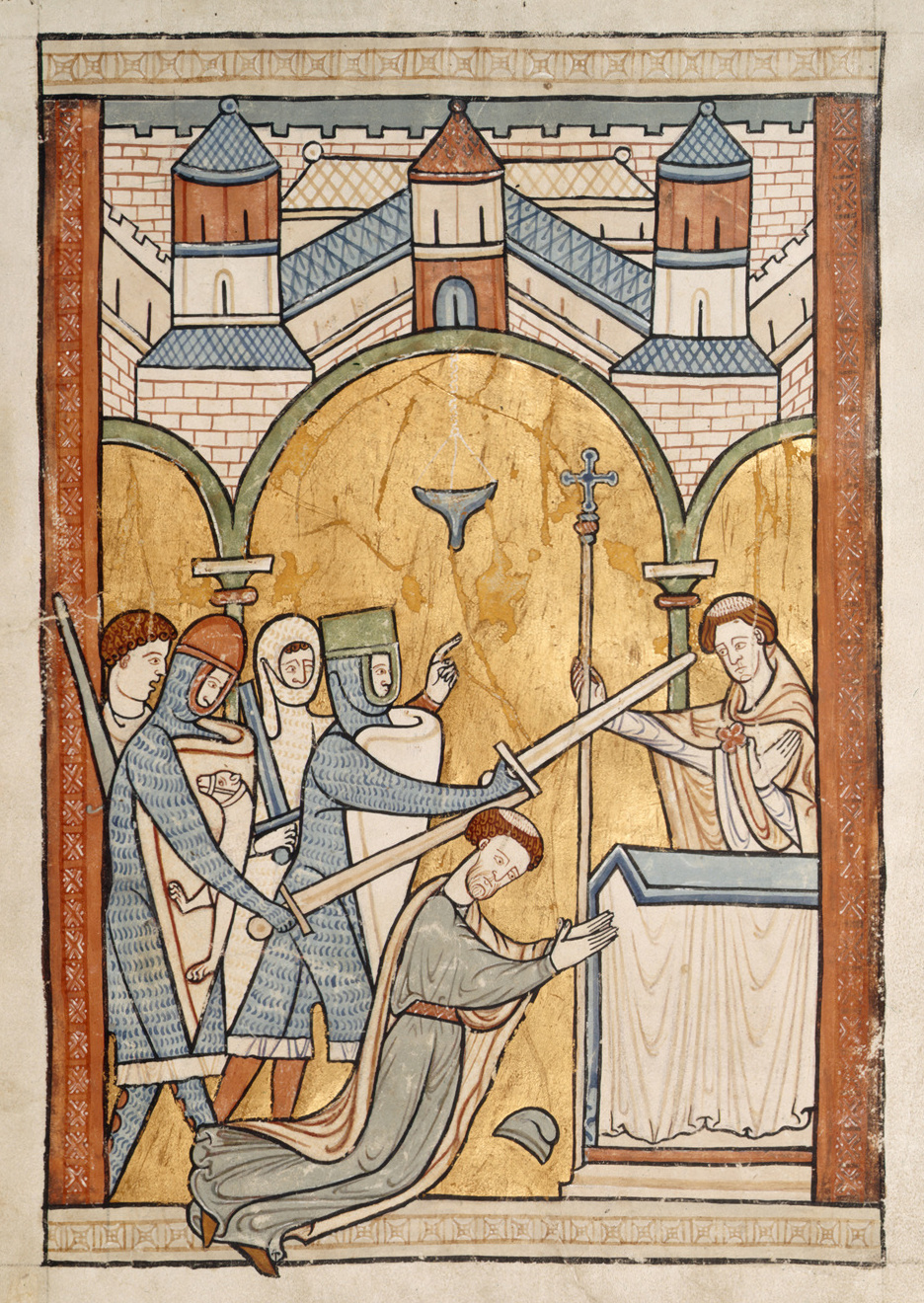
Contemporary illustration portraying the murder of Thomas Becket in 1170

Richard le Breton or Richard de Brito (fl. 1170) was one of the four knights who in 1170 murdered Thomas Becket, Archbishop of Canterbury.

== Origins ==
Roger Brito is listed in the Domesday Book of 1086 as holding land under the overlordship of the Church of Long Sutton in Somerset, in which county the family was later seated at Sampford Brett (alias Sandford-Bret). During the reign of King Henry I (1100–1135) Sampford Brett was held by Simon le Bret, from the feudal barony of Dunster by military service of half a knight's fee. He served in the household of Henry II's brother William, Count of Poitou and was a near neighbour of the FitzUrse family of Williton in Somerset, a member of which family was another of the assassins of Thomas Becket. Simon le Bret had two sons: Richard Brito, one of the assassins of Thomas Becket and Edmund le Bret, who adopted the surname de Sandford from his seat. William the Conqueror granted a manor in the eastern part of the parish of Great Stambridge in Essex and another in Sanford in Somerset to a Norman named Auvrai Le Breton following the Norman conquest of England. A later relative, Simon Le Breton, had two sons, Richard and Edmund, who inherited their share of Sanford and Great Master Bridge. Both were part of the royal court of King Henry II; in particular Richard Le Breton was a close friend of the king's brother, Prince William.

== Becket assassination ==
During the attack on Becket in 1170 by the four knights, Reginald Fitzurse, Hugh de Morville, Breton and William de Tracy, Brito is said to have broken his sword when striking at Becket's head.

According to Edward Grim:

... But the third knight inflicted a grave wound on the fallen one; with this blow he shattered the sword on the stone and his crown, which was large, separated from his head so that the blood turned white from the brain yet no less did the brain turn red from the blood; it purpled the appearance of the church with the colours of the lily and the rose, the colours of the Virgin and Mother and the life and death of the confessor and martyr...

He shouted "Take that, for the love of my lord William, the king's brother!" when he delivered the fatal blow. It was believed by William's friends that the count had died of a broken heart after Thomas Becket refused to allow his marriage.

== Aftermath ==
After the assassination the four knights fled to Scotland and from there to Knaresborough Castle in Yorkshire. All four were excommunicated by the Pope Alexander III at Easter in 1171 and ordered to undertake penitentiary pilgrimages to the Holy Land for 14 years.

Brito eventually retired to the island of Jersey. A ledger stone for one of the le Bretons of Jersey survives in St Thomas's Church in Salisbury. The Brett family of Whitestaunton in Somerset are said by the Duchess of Cleveland to be descended from the Brettes of Sampford Brett, and are the ancestors of the present Brett family, Viscounts Esher.
