= Thomas Becket =

Archbishop of Canterbury from 1162 to 1170

Saint Thomas Becket
- Archbishop of Canterbury
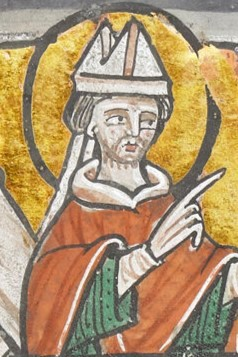
- Thomas Becket from the Collectio Epistolarum Sancti Thome Cantuariensis, c. 1180
- Church: Latin Church
- Archdiocese: Canterbury
- See: Canterbury
- Appointed: 24 May 1162
- Term ended: 29 December 1170
- Predecessor: Theobald of Bec
- Successor: Roger de Bailleul (Archbishop-elect)
- Previous posts: Archdeacon of Canterbury; Lord Chancellor of England

Orders
- Ordination: 2 June 1162
- Consecration: 3 June 1162 by Henry of Blois

Personal details
- Born: 21 December c. 1119 Cheapside, London, Kingdom of England
- Died: 29 December 1170 (aged 50 or 51) Canterbury Cathedral, Kent, Kingdom of England
- Buried: Canterbury Cathedral
- Denomination: Catholicism
- Parents: Gilbert Becket; Matilda

Sainthood
- Feast day: 29 December
- Venerated in: Catholic Church; Anglican Communion
- Beatified: by Pope Alexander III
- Canonized: 21 February 1173 by Pope Alexander III
- Attributes: Sword; martyrdom; episcopal vestments
- Patronage: Exeter College, Oxford; Portsmouth; Arbroath Abbey; secular clergy; City of London; St Thomas the Martyr, Oxford
- Shrines: Canterbury Cathedral
- Cult suppressed: 1538 (by Henry VIII)

Lord Chancellor
- In office 1155–1162
- Monarch: Henry II
- Preceded by: Robert of Ghent
- Succeeded by: Geoffrey Ridel

Thomas Becket (/ˈbɛkɪt/), also known as Saint Thomas of Canterbury, Thomas of London and later Thomas à Becket (Note: The name "Thomas à Becket" is not contemporary but was first used by Thomas Nashe in the 1590s.) (21 December 1119 or 1120 – 29 December 1170), was an English cleric and statesman who served as Lord Chancellor from 1155 to 1162, and then as Archbishop of Canterbury from 1162 until his death in 1170. He is known for his conflict with King Henry II over the rights and privileges of the Church and was murdered by followers of the king. Becket is venerated as a saint and martyr by the Catholic Church and the Anglican Communion.

Born into a Norman family in London, Becket was educated first at the Merton Priory in Surrey and then successively in London and Paris. He later found work at the household of Theobald of Bec, Archbishop of Canterbury and quickly won his confidence. Theobald would entrust him with a series of important offices and missions, and in 1154 recommended him as Lord Chancellor to King Henry II. In 1162, several months after Theobald's death, Henry appointed Becket Archbishop of Canterbury.

A major rift grew between Henry and Becket as the latter became increasingly ascetic and unexpectedly resisted the king's attempt to reassert royal prerogatives. In 1164, Becket was summoned to a trial by Henry and convicted on charges of contempt of royal authority and malfeasance. Refusing to accept the sentence, he fled to the Continent and spent six years in exile under the protection of Louis VII of France. A compromise was eventually reached through papal mediation. Becket returned to England in 1170 but dispute with the crown continued, leading to his death at the hands of four knights loyal to Henry in Canterbury Cathedral later in the year. Veneration of Becket as a martyr throughout Europe began soon after his death, and he was canonized by Pope Alexander III two years later.

== Sources ==
The main sources for the life of Becket are a number of biographies written by contemporaries. A few of these documents are by unknown writers, although historiography has given them names. The known biographers are John of Salisbury, Edward Grim, Benedict of Peterborough, William of Canterbury, William fitz Stephen, Guernes of Pont-Sainte-Maxence, Robert of Cricklade, Alan of Tewkesbury, Benet of St Albans, and Herbert of Bosham. The other biographers, who remain anonymous, are generally given the pseudonyms of Anonymous I, Anonymous II (or Anonymous of Lambeth), and Anonymous III (or Lansdowne Anonymous).

Besides these accounts, there are also two others that are likely contemporary that appear in the Quadrilogus II and the Thómas saga Erkibyskups. Besides these biographies, there is also the mention of the events of Becket's life in the chronicles of the time. These include Robert of Torigni's work, Roger of Howden's Gesta Regis Henrici Secundi and Chronica, Ralph de Diceto's works, William of Newburgh's Historia Rerum, and Gervase of Canterbury's works. Another account appears in Expugnatio Hibernica ("Conquest of Ireland", 1189) by Gerald of Wales.

== Early life ==
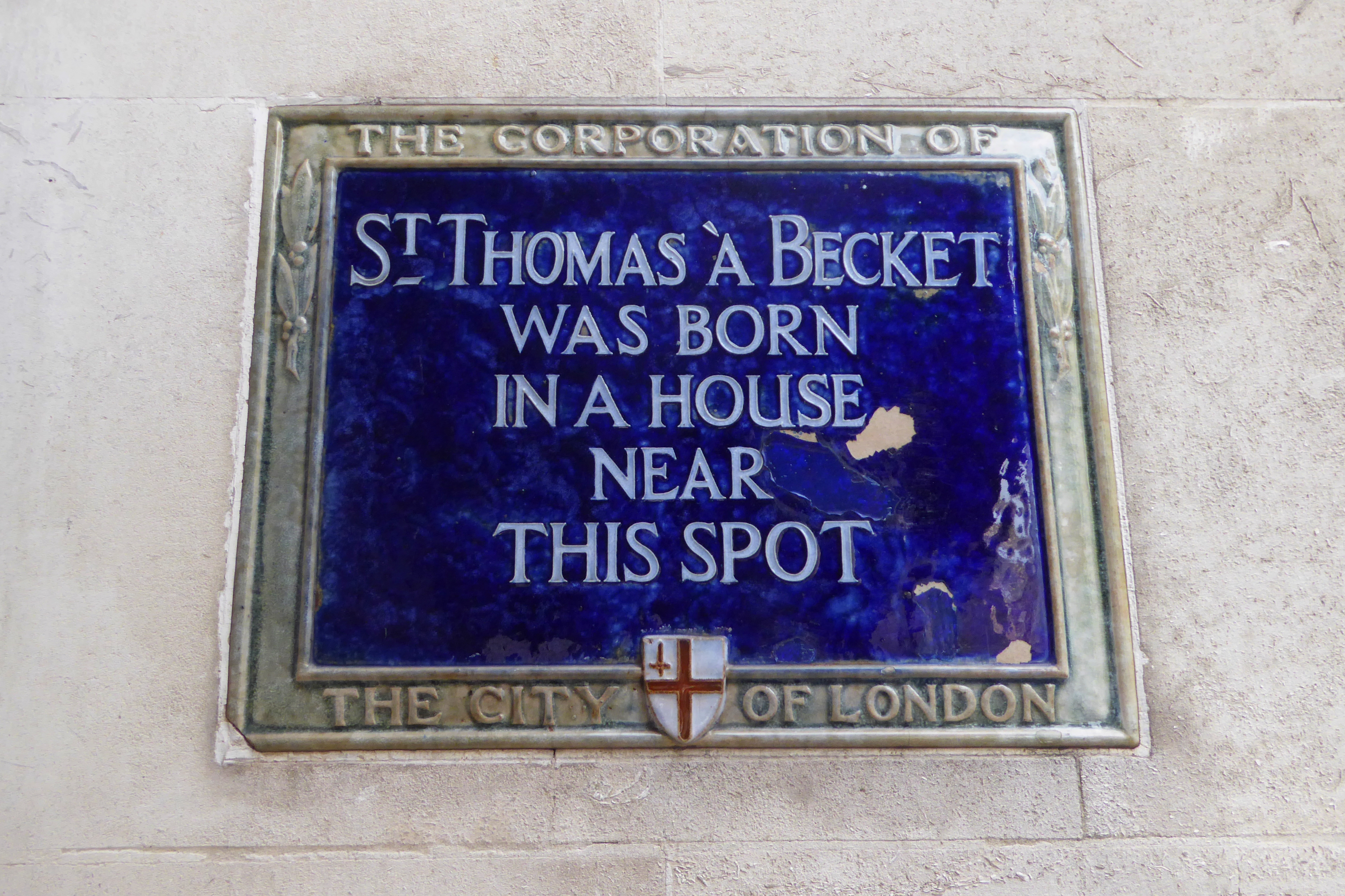
Plaque marking Becket's birthplace on Cheapside in London

Becket was born c. 1119 (or 1120 according to later tradition) at Cheapside, London, on 21 December, the feast day of Thomas the Apostle. He was the son of Gilbert and Matilda Beket. (Note: There is a legend that claims Thomas's mother was a Saracen princess who met and fell in love with his English father while he was on Crusade or pilgrimage in the Holy Land, followed him home, was baptised, and married him. This story has no truth to it, being a fabrication from three centuries after the saint's martyrdom, inserted as a forgery into Edward Grim's 12th-century Life of St Thomas. Matilda is occasionally known as Rohise.) Gilbert's father was from Thierville in the lordship of Brionne in Normandy and was either a small landowner or a petty knight. Matilda was also of Norman descent – her family may have originated near Caen. Gilbert was perhaps related to Theobald of Bec, whose family was also from Thierville. Gilbert began his life as a merchant, perhaps in textiles, but by the 1120s he was living in London and was a property owner, living on the rental income from his properties. He also served as the sheriff of the city at some point. Becket's parents were buried in Old St Paul's Cathedral.

One of Becket's father's wealthy friends, Richer de L'Aigle, often invited Thomas to his estates in Sussex where Becket encountered hunting and hawking. According to Grim, Becket learned much from Richer, who was later a signatory of the Constitutions of Clarendon against him.

At age 10, Becket was sent as a student to Merton Priory south-west of the city in Surrey. He later attended a grammar school in London, perhaps the one at St Paul's Cathedral. He did not study any subjects beyond the trivium and quadrivium at these schools. Around age 20, he spent about a year in Paris in France, but he did not study canon or civil law at the time, and his Latin remained somewhat rudimentary. Some time after Becket began his schooling, his father suffered financial reverses, and Becket was forced to earn a living as a clerk; with the help of his father he secured a place in the business of a relative. Later Becket acquired a position in the household of Archbishop of Canterbury Theobald of Bec.

Theobald entrusted him with several important missions to Rome and also sent him to Bologna and Auxerre to study canon law. In 1154, Theobald named Becket Archdeacon of Canterbury, and other ecclesiastical offices included benefices, prebends at Lincoln Cathedral and St Paul's Cathedral, and provost of Beverley. His efficiency in those posts led Theobald to recommend him to King Henry II for the vacant post of Lord Chancellor, to which Becket was appointed in January 1155.

As chancellor, Becket enforced the king's traditional sources of revenue that were exacted from all landowners, including churches and bishoprics. King Henry sent his son Henry to live in Becket's household, it being the custom then for noble children to be fostered out to other noble houses.

== Primacy ==
Becket was nominated as Archbishop of Canterbury in 1162, several months after the death of Theobald. His election was confirmed on 23 May 1162 by a royal council of bishops and noblemen. Henry may have hoped that Becket would continue to put royal government first rather than the church, but the famed transformation of Becket into an ascetic occurred at this time.

Becket enthroned as Archbishop of Canterbury from a Nottingham Alabaster in the Victoria & Albert Museum

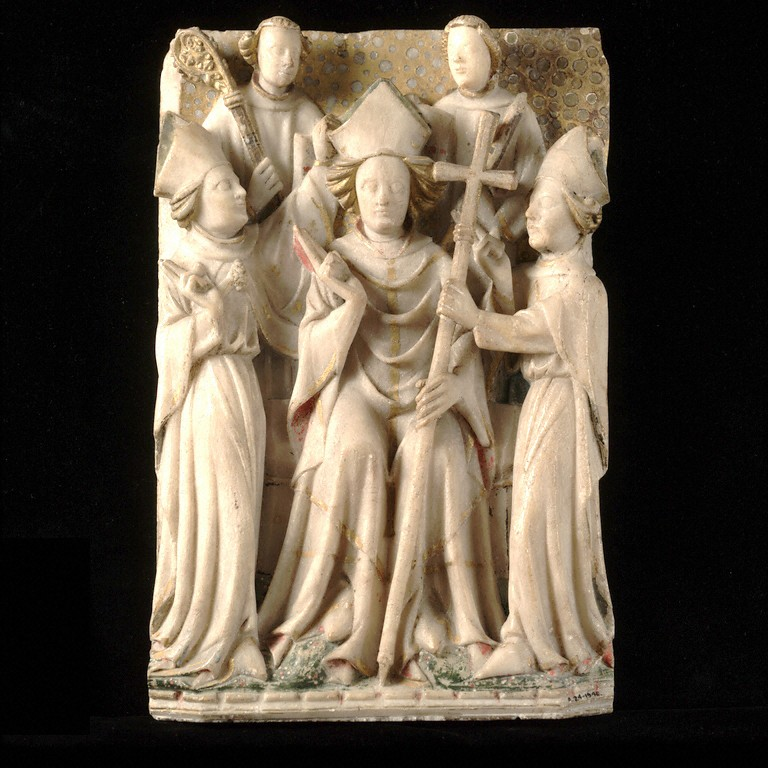

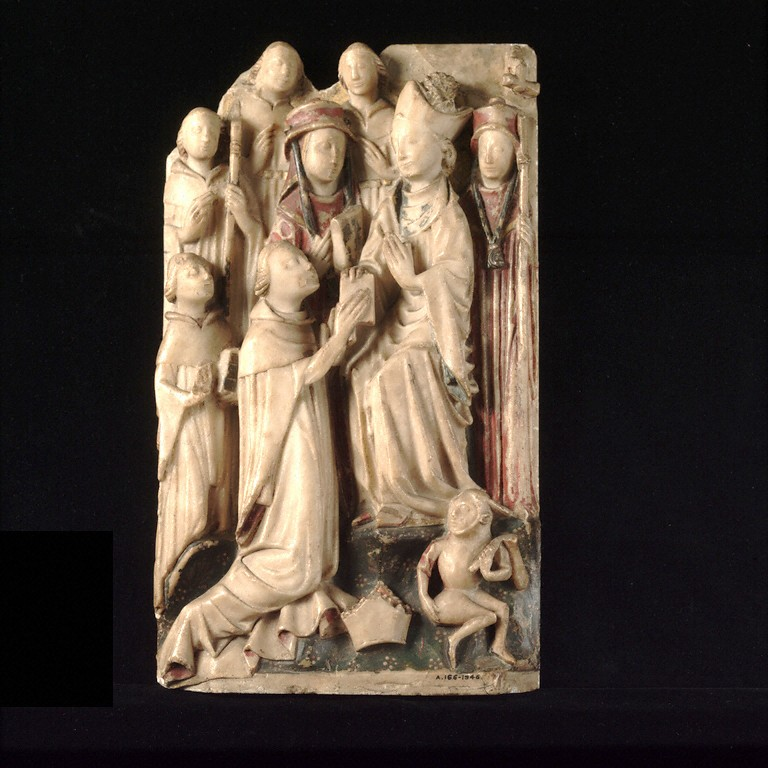

Becket was ordained a priest on 2 June 1162 at Canterbury, and on 3 June he was consecrated as archbishop by Henry of Blois, the Bishop of Winchester and the other suffragan bishops of Canterbury.

A rift grew between Henry and Becket as Becket resigned his chancellorship and sought to recover and extend the rights of the archbishopric. This led to a series of conflicts with the king, including one over the jurisdiction of secular courts over English clergymen, which accelerated antipathy between Becket and the king. Attempts by Henry to influence other bishops against Becket began in Westminster Abbey in October 1163, where the king sought approval of the traditional rights of royal government in regard to the church. This led to the Constitutions of Clarendon in 1164, where Becket was officially asked to agree to the king's rights or face political repercussions.

== Constitutions of Clarendon ==
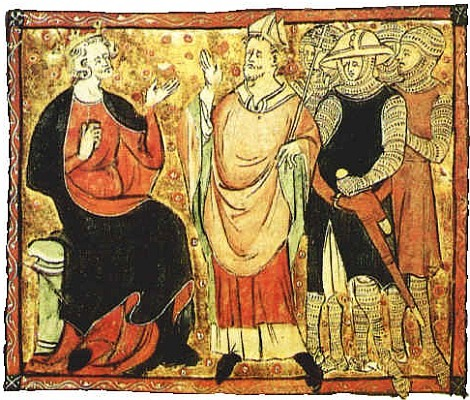
14th-century depiction of Becket at centre with King Henry II at left

King Henry II presided over assemblies of most of the higher English clergy at Clarendon Palace on 30 January 1164. In 16 constitutions he sought less clerical independence and weaker connections with Rome. He used his skills to induce their consent and apparently succeeded with all but Becket. Finally, even Becket expressed willingness to agree to the substance of the Constitutions of Clarendon, but he still refused formally to sign the documents. Henry summoned Becket to appear before a great council at Northampton Castle on 8 October 1164, to answer allegations of contempt of royal authority and malfeasance in the chancellor's office. Convicted on the charges, Becket stormed out of the trial and fled to the Continent.

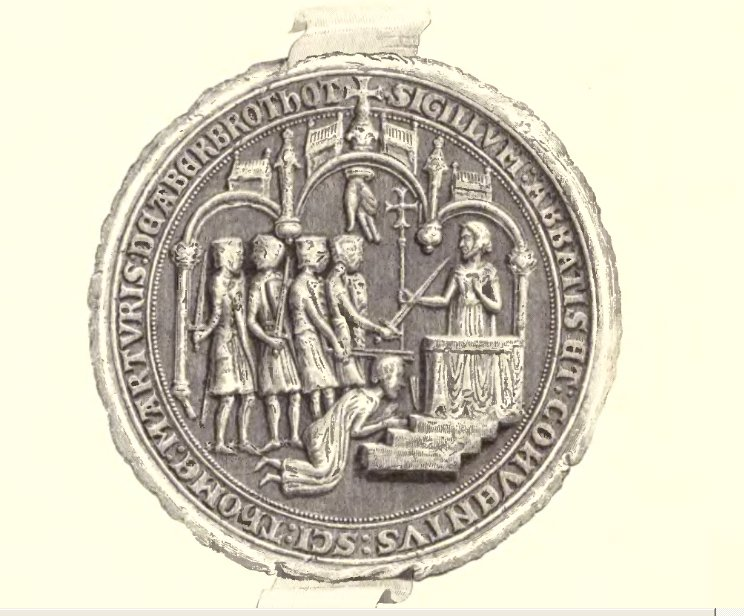
A Seal of the Abbot of Arbroath, showing the murder of Becket. Arbroath Abbey was founded 8 years after the death of St Thomas and dedicated to him; it became the wealthiest abbey in Scotland.

Henry pursued the fugitive archbishop with a series of edicts, targeting Becket and all Becket's friends and supporters, but King Louis VII of France offered Becket protection. He spent nearly two years in the Cistercian abbey of Pontigny until Henry's threats against the order obliged him to return to Sens. Becket fought back by threatening excommunication and an interdict against the king and bishops and the kingdom, but Pope Alexander III, though sympathising with him in theory, favoured a more diplomatic approach. Papal legates were sent in 1167 with authority to act as arbitrators. In 1170, Alexander sent delegates to impose a solution to the dispute. At that point, Henry offered a compromise that would allow Thomas to return to England from exile.

== Assassination ==
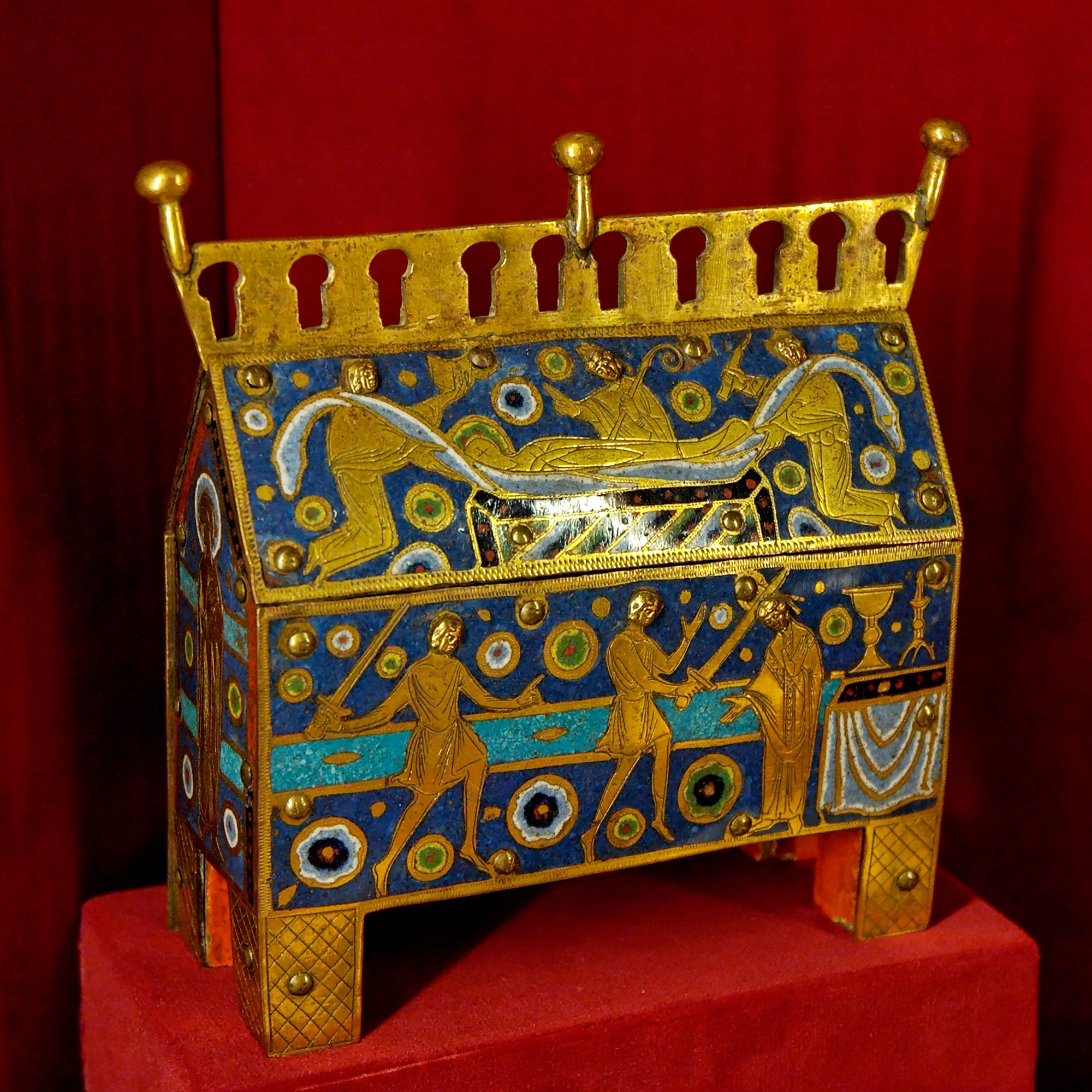
Becket's assassination and funeral, from a French enamelled chasse made c. 1190–1200, one of about 52 surviving examples

On 14 June 1170 Roger de Pont L'Évêque, Archbishop of York, was at Westminster Abbey with Gilbert Foliot, Bishop of London, and Josceline de Bohon, Bishop of Salisbury, to crown the heir apparent, Henry the Young King. This breached Canterbury's privilege of coronation and, in November 1170, Becket excommunicated all three.

On hearing reports of Becket's actions, Henry II is said to have uttered words interpreted by his men as wishing Becket killed. The exact wording is in doubt, and several versions were reported. The most commonly quoted, as invented in 1740 and handed down by oral tradition, is "Will no one rid me of this turbulent priest?", but according to historian Simon Schama this is incorrect: he accepts the account of the contemporary biographer Edward Grim, writing in Latin, who gives, "What miserable drones and traitors have I nourished and brought up in my household, who let their lord be treated with such shameful contempt by a low-born cleric?" Many other variants have found their way into popular culture.

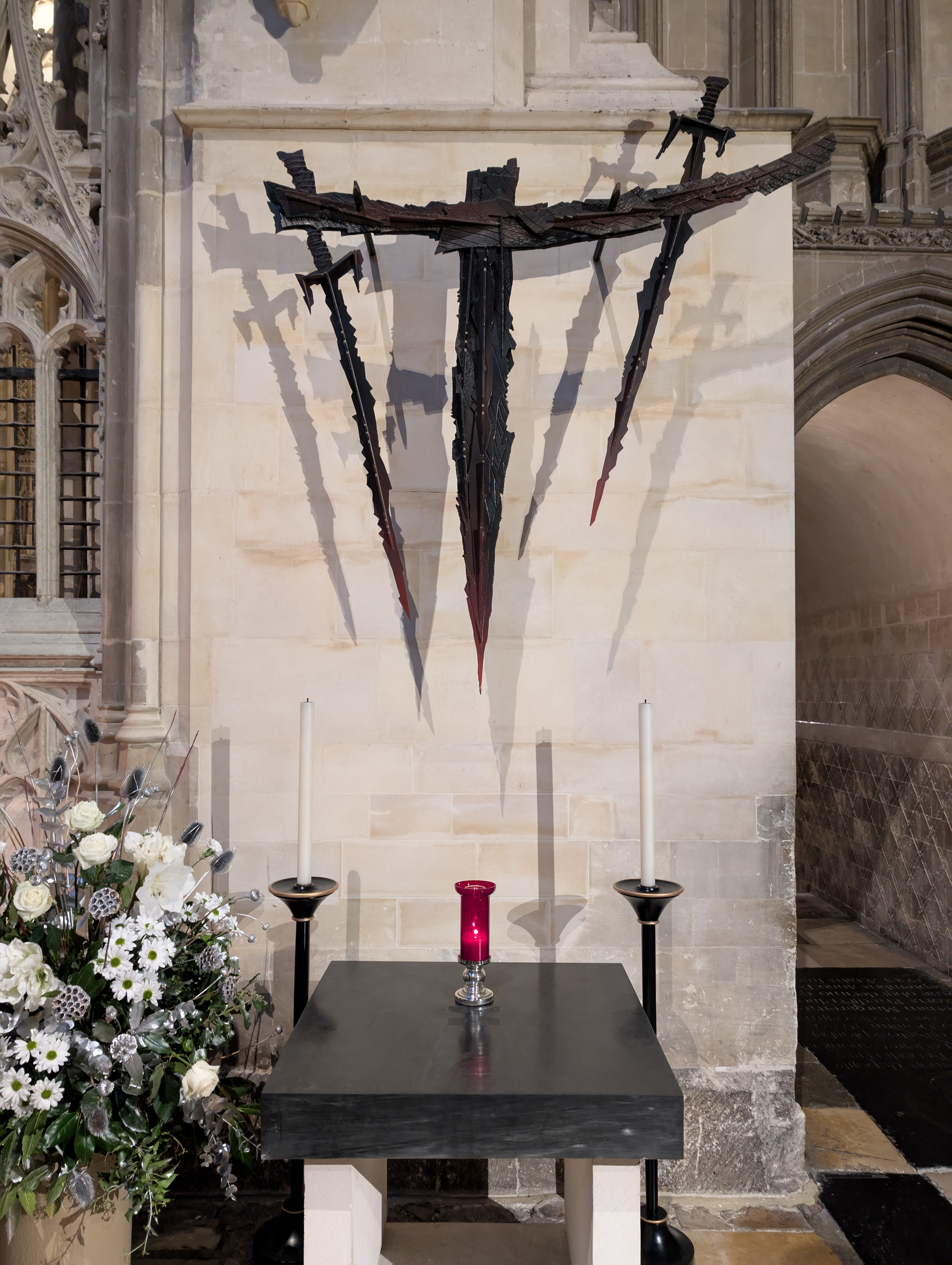
Sculpture and altar marking the spot of Thomas Becket's martyrdom in Canterbury Cathedral. The sculpture by Giles Blomfield represents the knights' four swords (two metal swords with reddened tips and their two shadows).

Regardless of what Henry said, it was interpreted as a royal command. Four knights—Reginald FitzUrse, Hugh de Morville, William de Tracy and Richard le Breton—set out to confront Becket. On 29 December 1170 they arrived at Canterbury. According to accounts by the monk Gervase of Canterbury and eyewitness Grim, the knights placed their weapons under a tree outside the cathedral and hid their armour under cloaks before entering to challenge Becket. The knights told Becket he was to go to Winchester to give an account of his actions, but Becket refused. When he refused their demands to submit to the king's will, they retrieved their weapons and rushed back inside. Becket, meanwhile, proceeded to the Cathedral for vespers. The other monks tried to bolt themselves in for safety, but Becket said to them, "It is not right to make a fortress out of the house of prayer!", ordering them to reopen the doors.

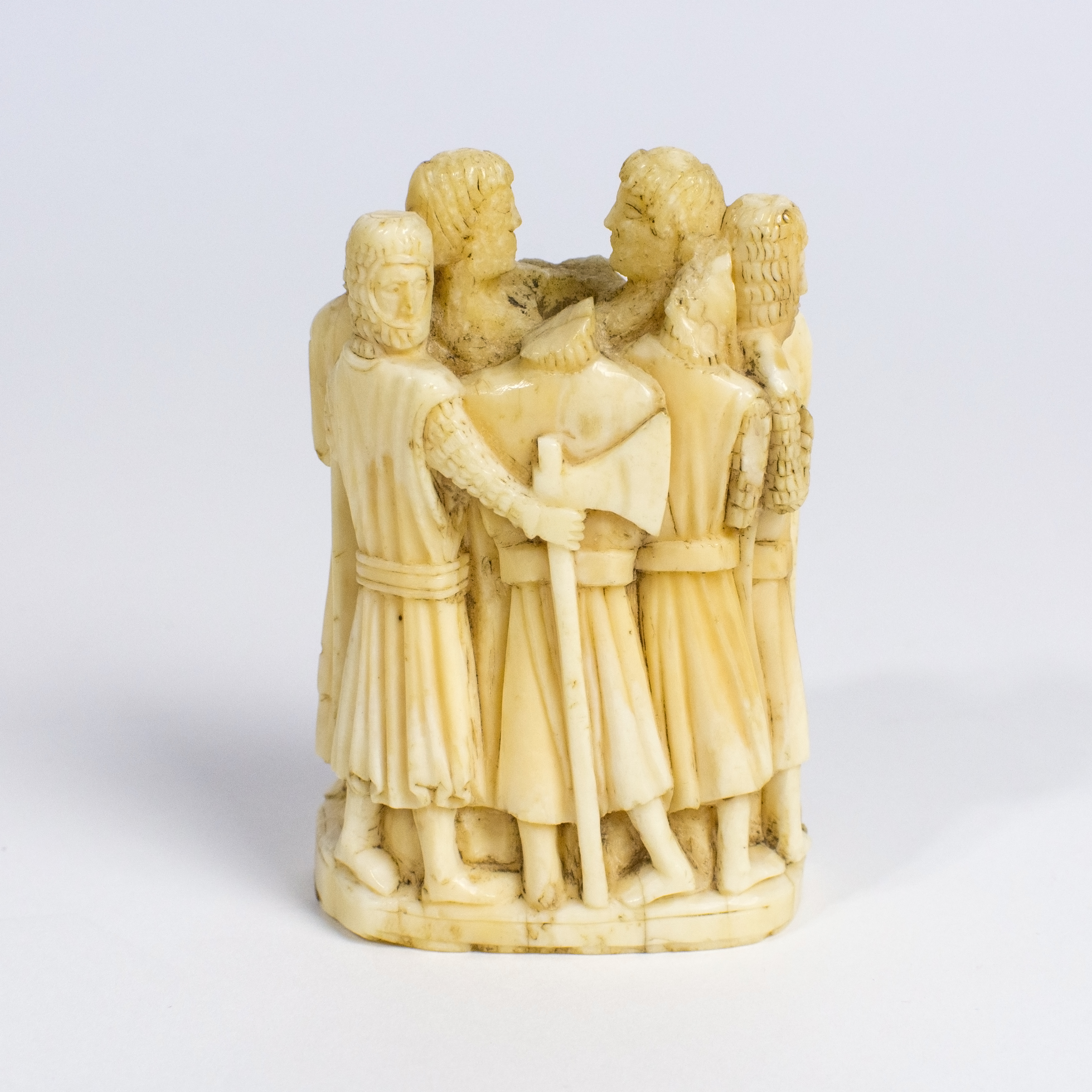
An ivory carving, c. 1200, portraying the knights involved in Becket's assassination. One knight holds an axe with which to break down the door of the cathedral.

The four knights, wielding drawn swords, ran into the room crying, "Where is Thomas Becket, traitor to the king and country?" They found Becket in a spot near a door to the monastic cloister, the stairs into the crypt, and the stairs leading up into the quire of the cathedral, where the monks were chanting vespers. On seeing them Becket said, "I am no traitor and I am ready to die." One knight grabbed him and tried to pull him outside, but Becket grabbed onto a pillar and bowed his head to make peace with God.

Several contemporary accounts of what happened next exist; of particular note is that of Grim, who was wounded in the attack. This is part of his account:

...the impious knight... suddenly set upon him and [shaved] off the summit of his crown which the sacred chrism consecrated to God... Then, with another blow received on the head, he remained firm. But with the third the stricken martyr bent his knees and elbows, offering himself as a living sacrifice, saying in a low voice, "For the name of Jesus and the protection of the church, I am ready to embrace death." But the third knight inflicted a grave wound on the fallen one; with this blow... his crown, which was large, separated from his head so that the blood turned white from the brain yet no less did the brain turn red from the blood; it purpled the appearance of the church... The fifth – not a knight but a cleric who had entered with the knights... placed his foot on the neck of the holy priest and precious martyr and (it is horrible to say) scattered the brains with the blood across the floor, exclaiming to the rest, "We can leave this place, knights, he will not get up again."

== After Becket's death ==
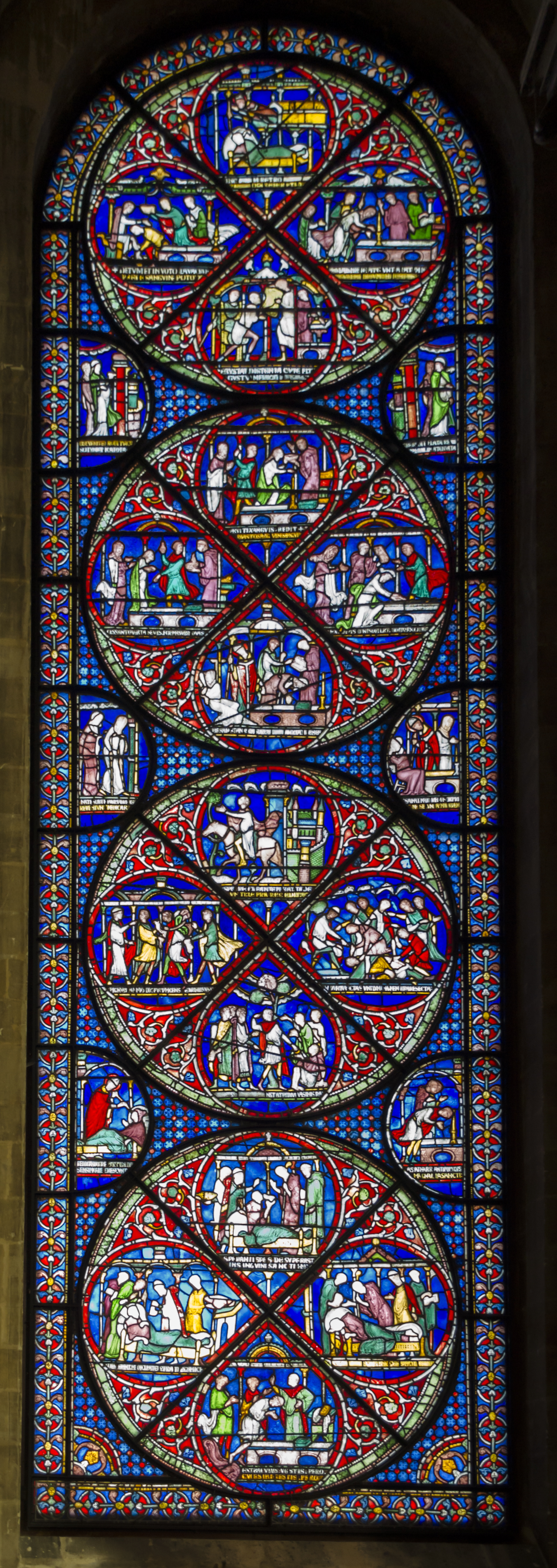
Stained glass miracle window in Canterbury Cathedral, c. 1215, depicting the life of St Thomas Becket.

After his death, the monks prepared Becket's body for burial. According to some accounts, it was found that Becket had worn a hairshirt under his archbishop's garments – a sign of penance. Soon after, the faithful throughout Europe began venerating Becket as a martyr, and on 21 February 1173 – little more than two years after his death – he was canonised by Pope Alexander III in St Peter's Church, Segni. In 1173, Becket's sister Mary was appointed abbess of Barking as reparation for the murder of her brother. On 12 July 1174, amidst the Revolt of 1173–1174, Henry humbled himself in public penance at Becket's tomb and at St Dunstan's Church, Canterbury, which became a popular pilgrimage site.

Becket's assassins fled north to de Morville's Knaresborough Castle for about a year. De Morville also held property in Cumbria, and this too may have provided a hiding place, as the men prepared for a longer stay in the separate kingdom of Scotland. They were not arrested and Henry did not confiscate their lands, but he did not help them when they sought his advice in August 1171. Pope Alexander excommunicated all four. Seeking forgiveness, the assassins travelled to Rome, where Alexander ordered them to serve as knights in the Holy Lands for a period of 14 years.

This sentence also inspired the Knights of Saint Thomas, incorporated in 1191 at Acre and which was to be modelled on the Teutonic Knights. This was the only military order native to England (with chapters in Acre, London, Kilkenny, and Nicosia), just as the Gilbertine Order was the only monastic order native to England.

The monks were afraid Becket's body might be stolen, and so his remains were placed beneath the floor of the eastern crypt of the cathedral. A stone cover over it had two holes where pilgrims could insert their heads and kiss the tomb, as illustrated in the "Miracle Windows" of the Trinity Chapel. A guard chamber (now the Wax Chamber) had a clear view of the grave. In 1220 Becket's bones were moved to a gold-plated, bejewelled shrine behind the high altar in the recently built Trinity Chapel. The golden casket was placed on a pink marble base with prayer niches raised on three steps. Canterbury's religious history had always brought many pilgrims, and after Becket's death the numbers rapidly rose.

== Cult in the Middle Ages ==
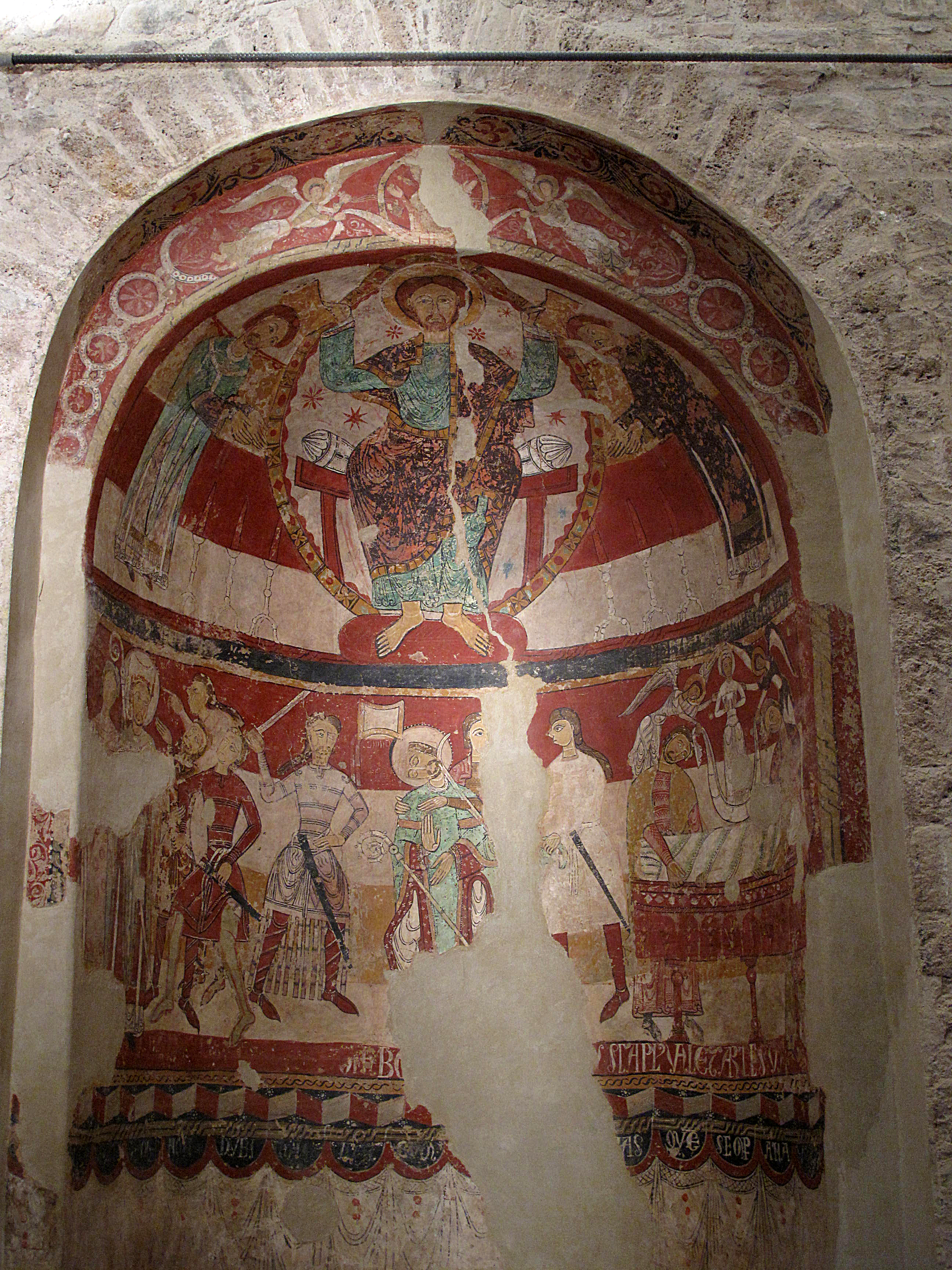
Becket's consecration, death and burial, at wall paintings in Santa Maria de Terrassa (Terrassa, Catalonia, Spain), romanesque frescoes, c. 1180

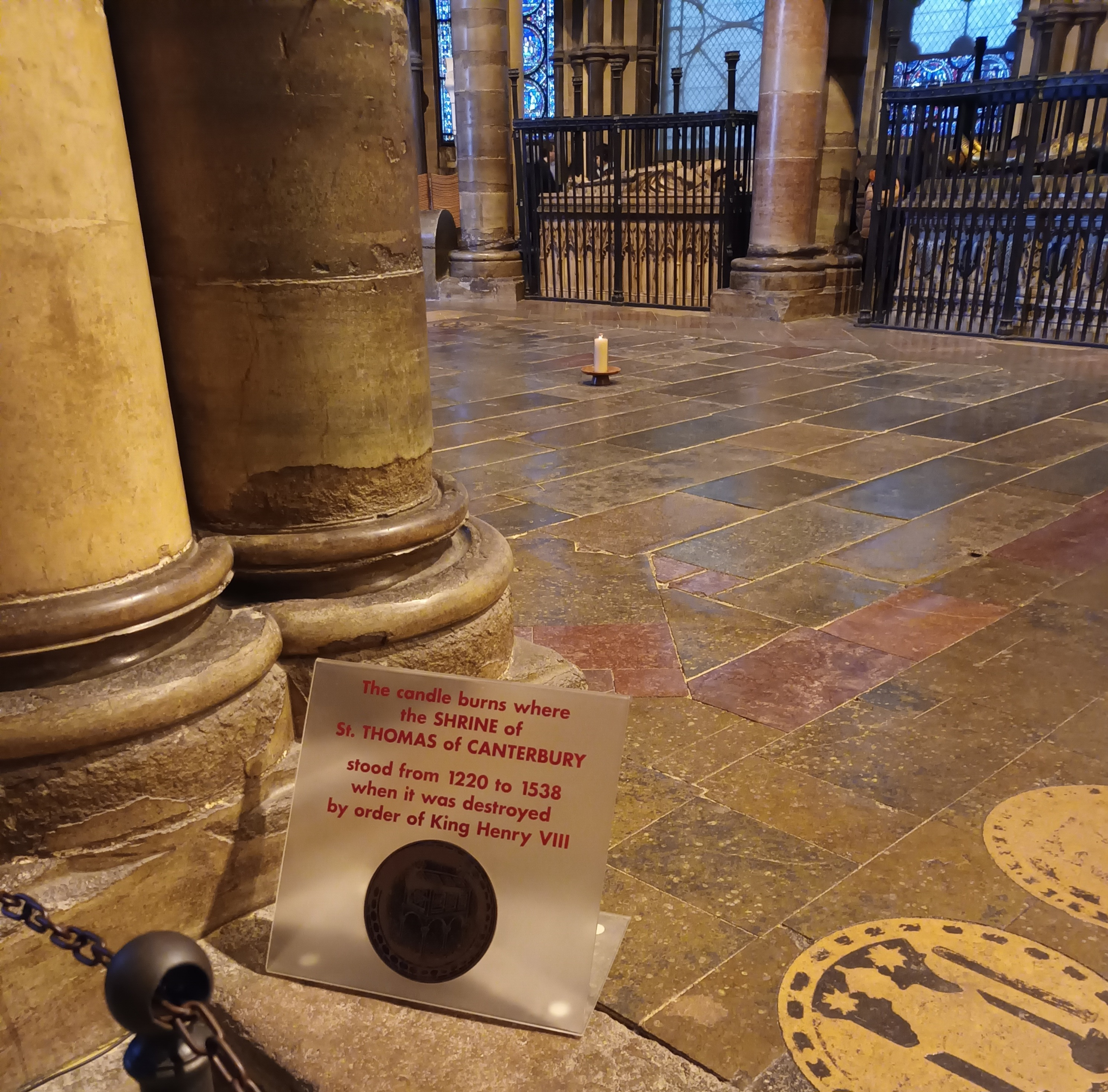
Former site of Thomas Becket's shrine in Canterbury Cathedral

In Dublin, the Abbey of St Thomas the Martyr was built in 1177 for the Augustines. In Scotland, King William the Lion ordered the building of Arbroath Abbey in 1178. On completion in 1197 the new foundation was dedicated to Becket, whom the king had known personally while at the English court as a young man.

The translation of Becket's body occurred on 7 July 1220, the 50th jubilee year of his death, and was "one of the great symbolic events in the life of the medieval English Church", attended by King Henry III, the papal legate, Archbishop of Canterbury Stephen Langton, and many dignitaries and magnates, both secular and ecclesiastical. A "major new feast day was instituted, commemorating the translation... celebrated each July almost everywhere in England and in many French churches." It was suppressed in 1536 with the Reformation. The shrine was destroyed in 1538 during the dissolution of the monasteries on orders from King Henry VIII. He also destroyed Becket's bones and ordered all mention of his name obliterated.

A cult began, which included drinking of "water of Saint Thomas", a mix of water and the remains of the martyr's blood miraculously multiplied. The procedure was frowned upon by the more orthodox, due to the similarities with the eucharist of the blood of Jesus. The saint's fame quickly spread through the Norman world. The first holy image of Becket is thought to be a mosaic icon still visible in Monreale Cathedral in Sicily, created shortly after his death. Becket's cousins obtained refuge at the Sicilian court during their exile, and King William II of Sicily wed a daughter of Henry II. Marsala Cathedral in western Sicily is dedicated to Becket. Over 45 medieval chasse reliquaries decorated in champlevé enamel showing similar scenes from Becket's life survive, including the Becket Casket, constructed to hold relics of him at Peterborough Abbey and now housed in London's Victoria and Albert Museum.

As the scion of a mercantile dynasty of later centuries, Mercers, Becket was much regarded as a Londoner by citizens and adopted as London's co-patron saint with Saint Paul: both appear on the seals of the city and of the Lord Mayor. The Bridge House Estates seal has only a Becket image, while his martyrdom is shown on the reverse.

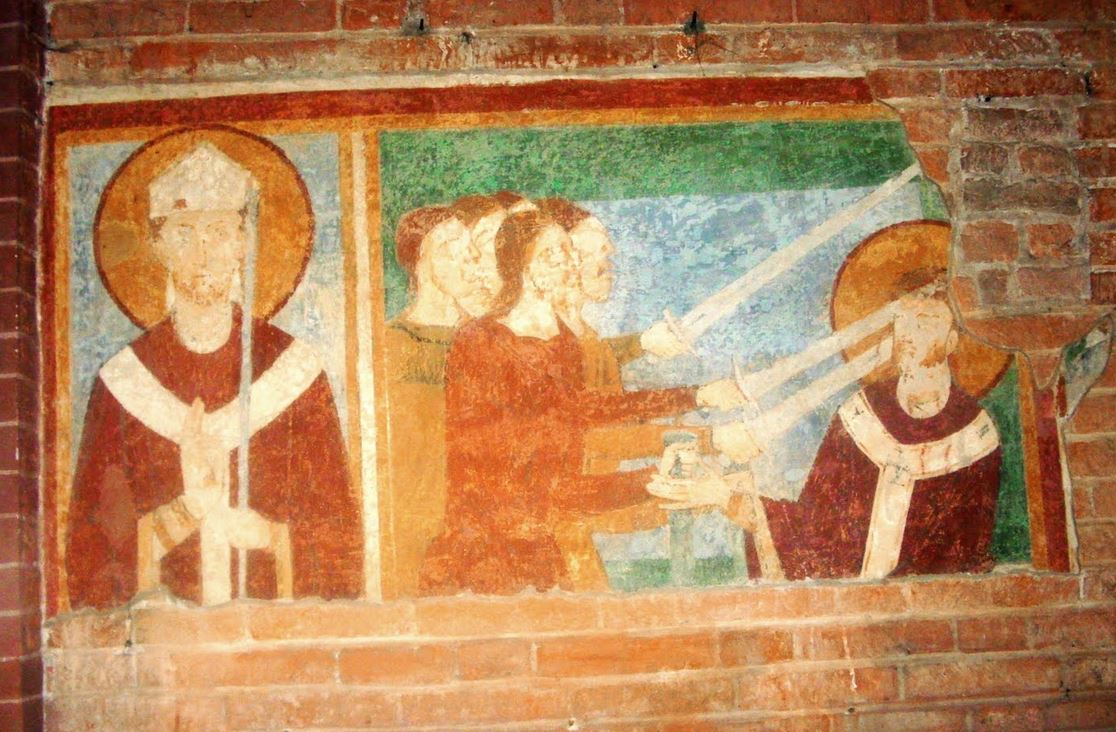
Fresco depicting the murder of Thomas Becket; on the left is the figure of Saint Lanfranco in act of blessing. Church of San Lanfranco, Pavia.

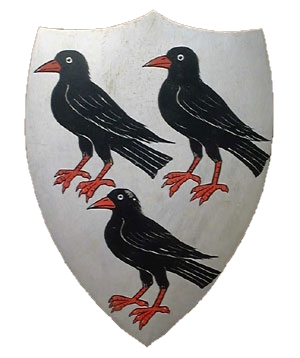
Attributed arms

== Legacy ==
- In 1170 King Alfonso VIII of Castille married Eleanor Plantagenet, second daughter of Henry II and Eleanor, Queen of England and Duchess of Aquitaine. She honoured Becket with a wall painting of his martyrdom that survives in the church of San Nicolás de Soria in Spain. Becket's assassination made an impact in Spain: within five years of his death Salamanca had a church named after him, Iglesia de Santo Tomás Cantuariense. Monumental frescoes with the martyrdom of Becket were depicted in the romanesque church of Santa Maria in Terrassa.
- Geoffrey Chaucer's The Canterbury Tales features a company of pilgrims travelling from Southwark to Becket's shrine in Canterbury Cathedral.
- The story of Becket's life became a popular theme for medieval Nottingham alabaster carvers. One set of Becket panels is shown in the Victoria and Albert Museum.
- The arms of the city of Canterbury, officially registered in 1619 but dating back to at least 1380, is based on the attributed arms of Becket: Argent, three Cornish choughs proper, with the addition of a chief gules charged with a lion passant guardant or from the Royal Arms of England.
- In 1884 Alfred, Lord Tennyson wrote Becket, a play about Becket and Henry II that Henry Irving produced after Tennyson's death and played in the title role. Modern works based on the Becket story include: T. S. Eliot's play Murder in the Cathedral, adapted as the opera Assassinio nella cattedrale by Ildebrando Pizzetti; Jean Anouilh's play Becket, where Becket is not a Norman but a Saxon, adapted for the screen in 1964, and starring Peter O'Toole and Richard Burton; and Paul Webb's play Four Nights in Knaresborough, which Webb adapted for the screen, selling the rights to Harvey and Bob Weinstein. The power struggle between Church and King is a theme of Ken Follett's novel The Pillars of the Earth, where a late scene features the murder of Becket. An oratorio by David Reeves, Becket – The Kiss of Peace, was premièred in 2000 at Canterbury Cathedral, where the event had occurred, as a part of the Canterbury Festival, and a fundraiser for the Prince's Trust.
- The Becket Fund for Religious Liberty, a non-profit, non-partisan legal and educational institute in the United States fostering free expression for religious traditions took its inspiration from Becket.
- In 2005 a poll of historians by BBC History magazine of the "worst Briton" in each century of the last 1,000 years selected Becket as the worst of the 12th century. The following year the magazine polled its readers which of the ten selected by historians was the worst of the last millennium. Becket came second behind Jack the Ripper. The editor of the magazine suggested that Becket and the Ripper had been chosen because they were the best known names, and few would have heard of most of the other candidates.
- The many UK churches dedicated to Becket include Cathedral Church of St Thomas of Canterbury, Portsmouth, St Thomas of Canterbury Church, Canterbury, Church of St Thomas the Martyr, Monmouth, St Thomas à Becket Church, Pensford, St Thomas à Becket Church, Widcombe, Church of St Thomas à Becket, Capel, St Thomas the Martyr, Bristol, and St Thomas the Martyr's Church, Oxford. Those in France include Église Saint-Thomas de Cantorbéry at Mont-Saint-Aignan, Upper-Normandy, Église Saint-Thomas-Becket at Gravelines (Nord-Pas-de-Calais), Église Saint-Thomas Becket at Avrieux (Rhône-Alpes), and Église Saint-Thomas Becket at Bénodet (Brittany).
- Among his obligations in contrition to Henry, William de Tracy much enlarged and re-dedicated to St Thomas of Canterbury the parish church in Lapford, Devon, in his manor of Bradninch. The martyrdom day is still marked by a Lapford Revel.
- British schools named after Becket include Becket Keys Church of England School and St Thomas of Canterbury Church of England Aided Primary School. British hospitals include St Thomas' Hospital.
- Part of the Hungarian city of Esztergom is named Szenttamás ("Saint Thomas"), on a hill called "Szent Tamás" dedicated to Thomas Becket – a classmate of Lucas, Archbishop of Esztergom in Paris.
- In the treasury of Fermo Cathedral is the Fermo chasuble of Thomas Becket, on display at Museo Diocesano.
- Becket is honoured in the Church of England and in the Episcopal Church on 29 December.
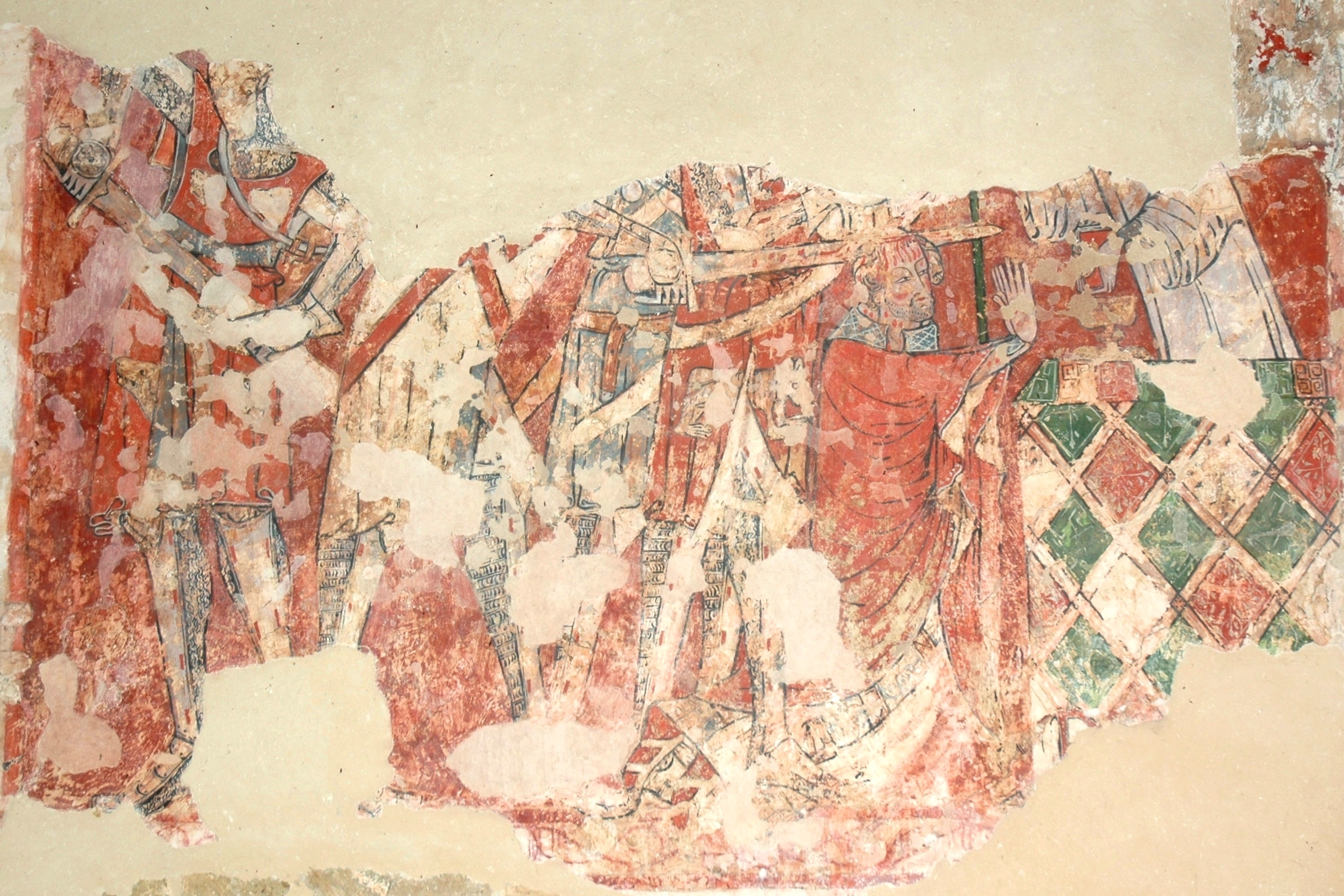
Wall painting of Thomas Becket's martyrdom painted in the 1330s in the parish church of St Peter ad Vincula, South Newington, Oxfordshire

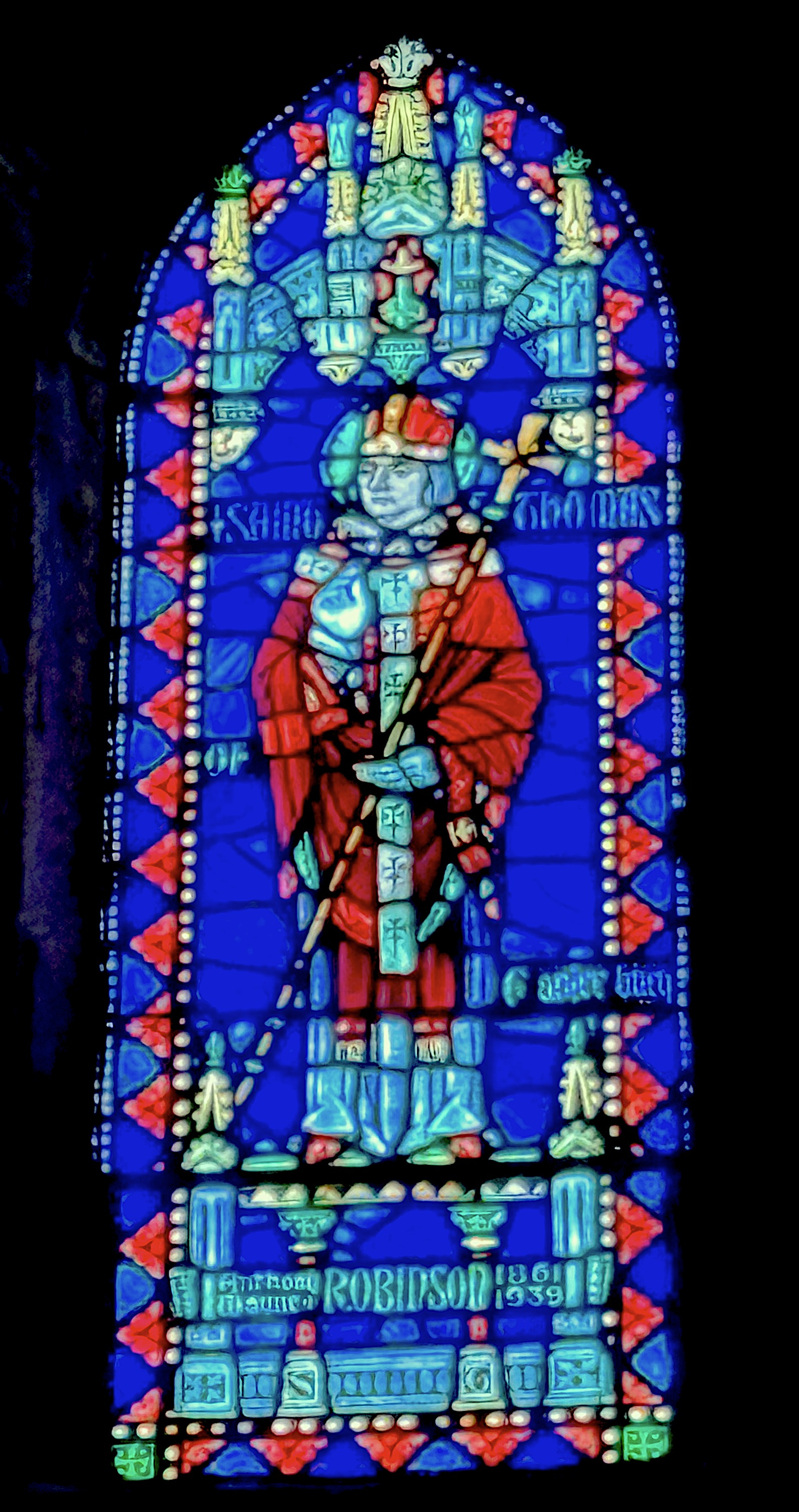
Thomas Becket in clerestory of Church of the Good Shepherd (Rosemont, Pennsylvania)

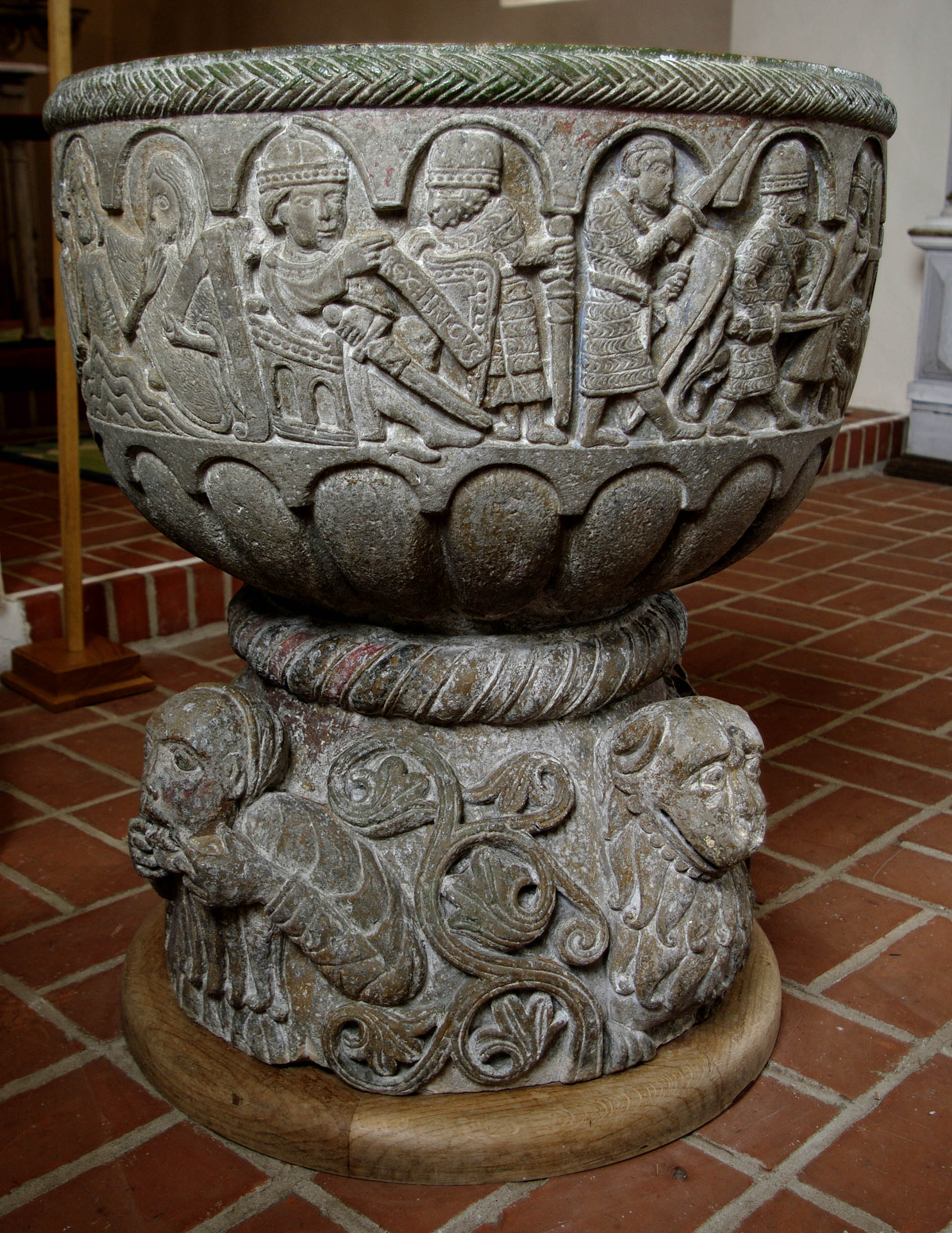
Baptismal font depicting Henry II of England ordering the murder of Thomas Becket (Lyngsjö Church, Sweden, late 12th century)

== Explanatory notes ==
Political offices
Preceded by Robert of Ghent	Lord Chancellor; 1155–1162	Succeeded by Geoffrey Ridel
Catholic Church titles
Preceded by Theobald of Bec	Archbishop of Canterbury; 1162–1170	Succeeded by Roger de Bailleul
