= William de Tracy =

Anglo-Norman knight who killed Thomas Becket in 1170)

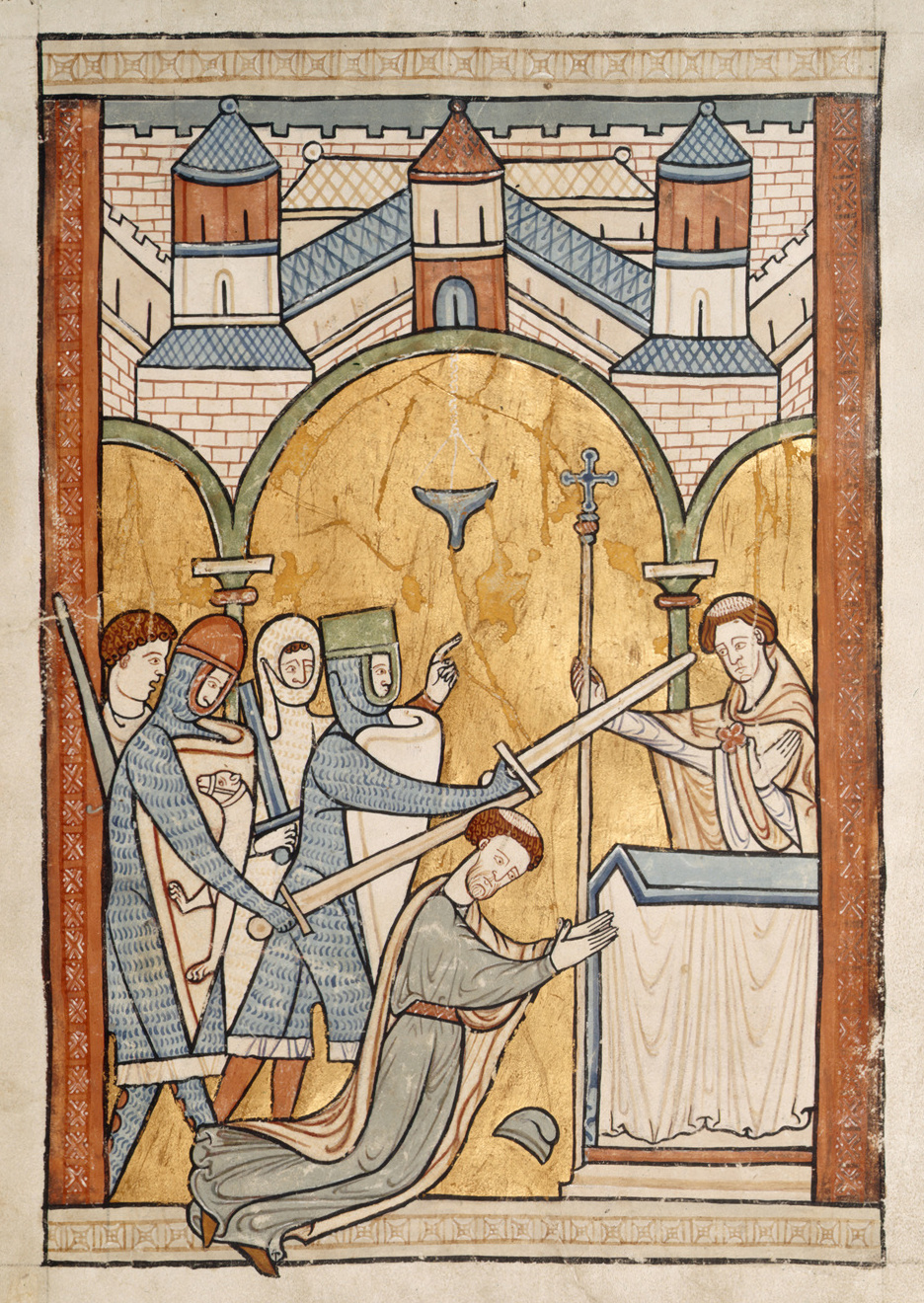
Contemporary drawing portraying the murder of Becket

William de Tracy (died c. 1189) was a knight and the feudal baron of Bradninch, Devon, with caput at the manor of Bradninch near Exeter, and was lord of the manors (amongst very many others) of Toddington, Gloucestershire and of Moretonhampstead, Devon. He is notorious as one of the four knights who assassinated Thomas Becket, Archbishop of Canterbury, in December 1170.

== Origins ==
William was a son of John de Sudeley and his wife, Grace de Tracy. Their elder son, Ralph de Sudeley (died c. 1192), became his father's heir, while the younger, William, inherited his mother's barony of Bradninch and assumed her family name as William de Tracy. He became a knight of Gloucestershire and held the lands of his brother by service of one knight's fee.

William appears in a charter of his older brother Ralph de Sudeley, assigning the manor of Yanworth, near Cirencester, to Gloucester Abbey. Two of the witnesses to that charter lived on land held by the Normandy branch of the de Tracys, and two of the English witnesses had previously witnessed a charter to Barnstaple Priory in 1146 for Henry de Tracy, who had married a daughter of Juhel de Mayenne as permitted by Stephen, King of England. In 1166, William held one fee from his brother Ralph.

== Murder of Becket ==
William was one of the four knights who, supposedly at the behest of King Henry II, in 1170 murdered Thomas Becket, Archbishop of Canterbury. His accomplices were Reginald Fitzurse, Hugh de Morville, and Richard le Breton (or de Brito). They afterwards invaded the Archbishop's Palace, plundering Papal Bulls and Charters, gold, silver, vestments, books, and utensils employed for the services of the church.

Henry failed to arrest the knights, advising them to flee to Scotland. Whilst their lands technically escheated to the crown, they appear to have continued to enjoy use of them after only a short interruption, presumably as a favour from the king. They stayed only a short while in Scotland, returning to the castle of Knaresborough in Yorkshire, the possession of Hugh de Morville.

== Benefactions ==
William executed a charter granting to the canons of Torre, in the county of Devon, all his lands at North Chillingford.

=== Alkborough ===
It is known that Hugh de Morville, Richard de Brito, and William de Tracy built a church at Alkborough, near Scunthorpe in North Lincolnshire, where, until 1690, an inscribed stone on the chancel recorded the benefaction.

=== Bovey Tracey ===
The name of the town of Bovey Tracey is derived from the River Bovey which passes through the town, and from the 'de Tracey' family – from Traci near Bayeux, Normandy, who settled in the area after the Norman Conquest of 1066. William rebuilt the town's Church of St Peter, Paul and Thomas after 1170 as part of his penance for his part in Becket's murder. In addition, he significantly rebuilt and added a tower, chancel, and porch to the church of Lapford, Devon, which was then re-dedicated to Becket.

=== Nymet Tracy ===
According to local tradition, William founded a church at Nymet Tracey near Bovey, in penance.

== Excommunication and exile ==
The benefactions failed to impress Pope Alexander III, and he excommunicated William and the other murderers on Maundy Thursday, March 25, 1171.

William set out for Rome after the end of September, but before Henry II's expedition to Ireland in October, when he made appearances in the shire court of Oxford, attesting a quitclaim relating to land of Winchcombe Abbey at Gagingwell, near Enstone, north of Oxford. In addition, he was present when the charter recording the transaction was offered up on the High Altar at Winchcombe Abbey. Scutage was paid on de Tracy's lands that year.

The departure of the other knights to Rome was delayed until two of them, FitzUrse and de Morville, had taken part in the great Revolt of 1173–74 against the king. Becket's murderers gained their audience with the Pope, who despite their penitence, declared they should be exiled and fight in Jerusalem "in knightly arms in The Temple for 14 years", and then return to Rome.

== Death and burial ==
There is speculation as to what happened next. Herbert of Bosham says that William did not reach the Holy Land but died as early as 1174 of leprosy at Cosenza in Southern Italy. After much examination the present Lord Sudeley dismissed this story as fictitious sensationalism on Herbert's part. Moreover, William's journey east is confirmed by Romwald II, Archbishop of Salerno and by Roger Hovenden, who stated that the Pope instructed the knights, once their duties were fulfilled, to visit the Holy Places barefoot and in hairshirts and then to live alone for the rest of their lives on the Black Mountain near Antioch, spending all their time there in vigils, prayers, and lamentations. It is thought that William retired to a hermitage there. Roger Hovenden related further that after their deaths the bodies of the knights were buried at Jerusalem before the door of The Temple, the Templar Round Church built on the site of the Temple of Solomon. This conforms to the tradition that the murderers were buried under the portico in front of the Al-Aqsa Mosque, which was the refectory of the Knights Templar.

Another tradition is that the bodies of the knights were returned to the island of Brean Down, off the coast of Weston-super-Mare and buried there.

== Relatives and descendants ==
William had a son, also called William, who made charitable benefactions in France, building and endowing a house for lepers at a place called Coismas, possibly Commeaux, or Couesmes-Vaucé. He also made gifts to the Priory of St Stephen, Le Plessis-Grimoult of lands possessed by the family before they all finally came to England. He died before 1194, leaving a son, Henry, who lost his lands in 1202.
