= Herbert of Bosham =

Herbert of Bosham was a twelfth-century English biographer of Thomas Becket who held a foremost place among the scholars in Thomas's household. His date of birth is unknown, but he was a member of Henry II's itinerant chapel by 1157 and likely died at Ourscamp around 1194.

== Early life ==
He was probably born in Bosham, Sussex, from which he took his name.

He studied theology in Paris as a pupil of Peter Lombard. He introduced Lombard's Sentences into England.

== Companion to Becket ==
He must have joined Becket's household before 1162 as, on his elevation in that year, the new archbishop immediately promoted him to a responsible position. He was to give his master advice on the performance of his duties, and to assist and even direct his studies of Scripture.

Herbert remained closely attached to Becket through the arduous and troubled years of his episcopacy and exile, up until almost the very eve of the final scene in Canterbury Cathedral. After returning to England with Becket in December 1170, he remained with him until he was sent back again on an errand to the French king. He vainly implored his master to let him stay for the end which both felt to be close at hand. And, in fact it came two days after Herbert's departure. Of all the archbishop's followers, he was the fiercest opponent of the King Henry II of England and the royal "customs". He was unafraid to confront the king to his face or to take on dangerous missions to England.

== Biographer ==
After Becket's death, Herbert seems to have lived mainly on the Continent, not revisiting England until about 1184, and he complains that he was neglected; he records, however, a friendly interview with the king himself. We know nothing of him after the year 1189.

Herbert of Bosham's verbose biography of Becket has less historical value of than that of William Fitzstephen. He shared Thomas's ideals and was an eyewitness of most of the incidents of his episcopacy. He had sat by him, for instance, during the stormy scenes of the trial at Northampton. On the other hand, he did not begin to write till 1184, many years after the events which he records, and Dom Albert L'Huillier gave reasons to doubt the accuracy of Herbert's reminiscences.

Besides the Life of St. Thomas, he wrote a lengthy Liber Melorum in praise of him. An edition of the Life is contained in vol. III of the Materials for the History of Thomas Becket (Rolls Series) edited by James Craigie Robertson; the volume also contains some extracts from the Liber Melorum.

== Biblical Studies ==
During the summer of 1190 Herbert had retired from court and commenced biblical study on the Psalms at the Cistercian Abbey of Ourscamp. He is reported to have used rabbinic sources, such as Rashi and Christian Hebraists, such as Hugh of St Victor and Andrew of St Victor.

== Fictional portrayals ==
Herbert was portrayed by actor Clive Currie in the 1924 silent film Becket, based on a play of the same title by Alfred Lord Tennyson.
