= Constitutions of Clarendon =

Legislation enacted by Henry II restricting Church power

The Constitutions of Clarendon were a set of legislative procedures enacted by Henry II of England in 1164. The Constitutions were composed of 16 articles and represented an attempt to restrict ecclesiastical privileges and to curb the power of the Church courts and the extent of papal authority in England. In the anarchic conditions of Henry II's predecessor, Stephen (reigned 1135–1154), the church had extended its jurisdiction by taking advantage of the weakness of royal authority. The Constitutions were claimed to restore the law as it was observed during the reign of Henry I (1100–1135).

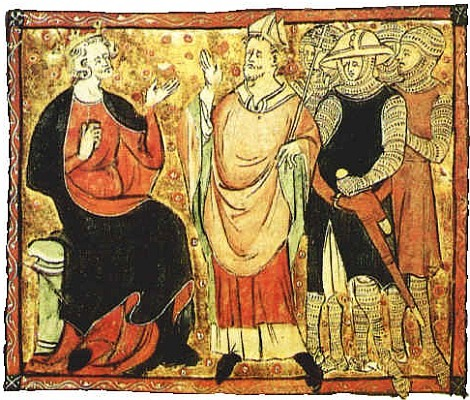
12th-century depiction of Henry II with Thomas Becket

The Constitutions take their name from Clarendon Palace, Wiltshire, the royal hunting lodge at which they were promulgated.

== Purposes ==
The Constitutions' primary goal was to deal with the controversial issue of "criminous clerks", or clergy accused of committing a serious secular crime but tried in ecclesiastical courts under "benefit of clergy". Unlike royal courts, these ecclesiastical courts were strictly limited in the punishments to which a convicted felon could be subjected; in particular the spilling of blood was prohibited. An ecclesiastical case of murder often ended with the defendant being defrocked (dismissed from the priesthood). In a royal court, murder was often punished with mutilation or execution.

The Constitutions of Clarendon were Henry II's attempts to deal with these problems (and conveniently increase his own power at the same time). He claimed that once the ecclesiastical courts had tried and defrocked clergymen, the Church could no longer protect the individual. As such, the convicted former clergy could face further punishment under the jurisdiction of secular courts.

It was formerly supposed that Henry wanted all clerics accused of crimes to be tried in the King's Courts. But this impression, as F. W. Maitland showed, is certainly wrong. A rather complicated arrangement was proposed by which cognizance of the case was first to be taken in the King's Court.

If the culprit proved to be a cleric, the case was to be tried in the ecclesiastical court, but an officer of the King's Court was to be present. If the accused was found guilty, the royal officer was to conduct him back to the King's Court after degradation, where he would be dealt with as an ordinary criminal and adequately punished.

The king's contention was that flogging, fines, degradation, and excommunication, beyond which the spiritual courts could not go, were insufficient as punishment. Thomas Becket, Archbishop of Canterbury (1162–1170), argued in response that, apart from the principle of clerical privilege, to degrade a man first and to hang him afterwards was to punish him twice for the same offence. Once degraded, he lost all his rights, and if he committed another crime, he might then be punished with death like any other felon.

== Effect ==
Thomas Becket resisted the Constitutions, especially the clause concerning "criminous clerks". As a result, Henry put Becket up for trial at Northampton. Becket fled into exile in France with his family. Bishops were in agreement over the articles until the Pope disapproved and then Becket repudiated his arguments. The ensuing controversy became so bitter that Becket was murdered on 29 December 1170. After this, Henry felt compelled to revoke the two controversial clauses, which went against canon law. However, the other clauses remained in effect as law of the land.
