= William Fitzstephen =

English administrator

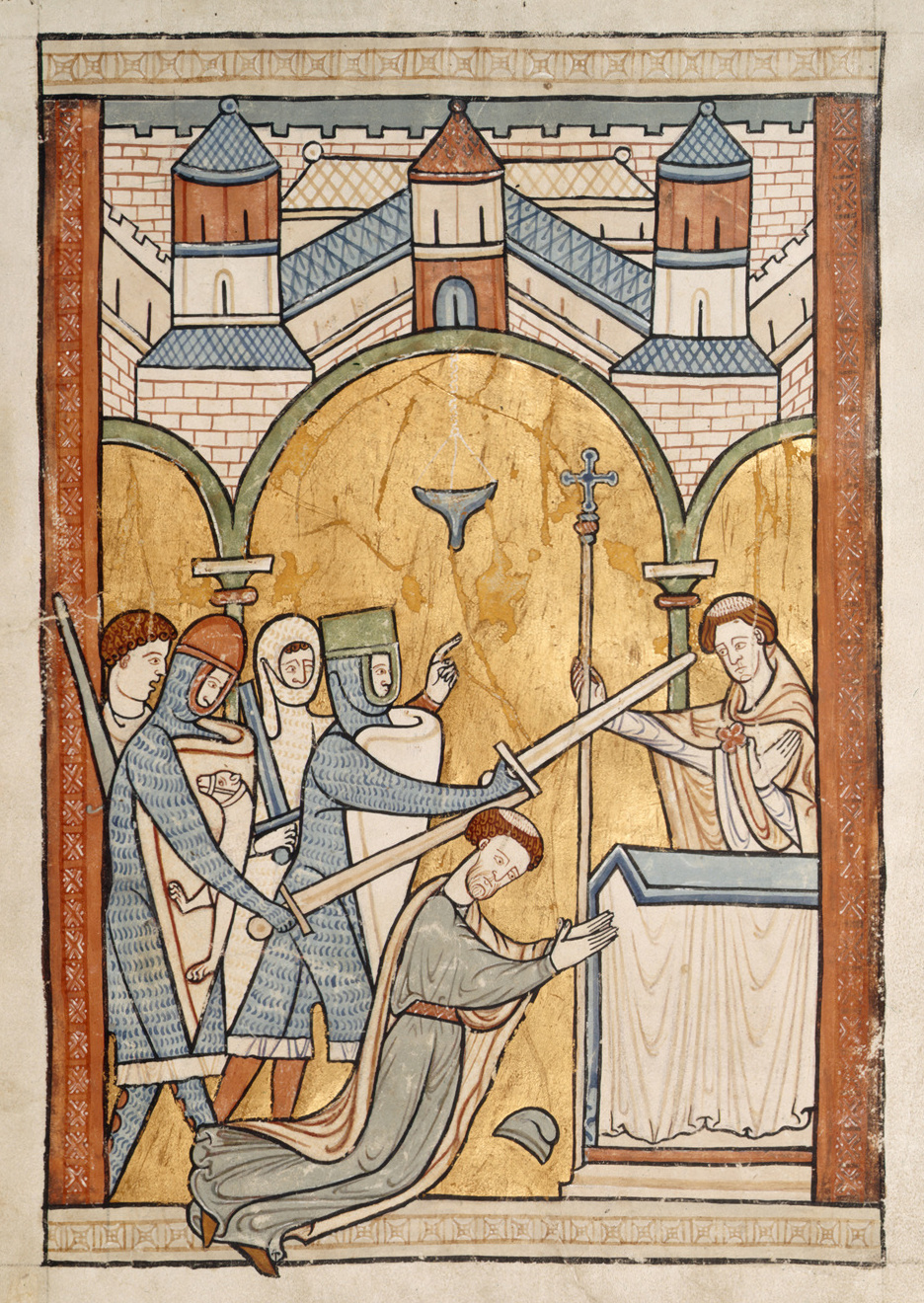
Thirteenth-century manuscript illumination depicting Thomas Becket's assassination in Canterbury Cathedral – Fitzstephen was an eye-witness

William Fitzstephen (also William fitz Stephen; died c. 1191) was a cleric and administrator in the service of Thomas Becket. In the 1170s, he wrote a long biography of Thomas Becket – the Vita Sancti Thomae (Life of St. Thomas).

Fitzstephen had been Becket's personal household clerk for ten years. When Becket became Chancellor of England, Becket granted Fitzstephen full authority to act in his name in diocesan matters. Fitzstephen became a subdeacon with responsibility for perusing letters and petitions involving the diocese.

Fitzstephen appeared with Becket at the council at Northampton Castle, where the archbishop was disgraced. When Becket was forced into exile, after refusing to sign the Constitutions of Clarendon, King Henry II accepted a petition, in verse, from Fitzstephen and pardoned Becket from the banishment. When Becket and the king reconciled, Fitzstephen became his administrator once more. Fitzstephen records that he was among those of Becket's advisors who cautioned against excommunicating King Henry. Fitzstephen was with Becket on the day of Becket's assassination in Canterbury Cathedral in 1170.

Fitzstephen wrote a biography of Becket, detailing the differences between the archbishop and the King. This also included an account of London in the 12th century, which was included in the biography as a preface, Descriptio Nobilissimi Civitatis Londoniae. The three editions of this work demonstrate a continuing familiarity with the life of the city. For this reason, he is not thought to be the same William Fitzstephen whom Henry appointed to be Sheriff of Gloucester and itinerant justice in 1171.

== See also ==
- Edward Grim

== Sources ==
- Davis, Henry William Carless (1911). "Fitz Stephen, William" . Encyclopædia Britannica. Vol. 10 (11th ed.). p. 448.
- Cousin, John William (1910), "Fitzstephen, William", A Short Biographical Dictionary of English Literature, London: J. M. Dent & Sons – via Wikisource
- Archer, Thomas Andrew (1889). "Fitzstephen, William" . In Stephen, Leslie (ed.). Dictionary of National Biography. Vol. 19. London: Smith, Elder & Co. pp. 212–213. Endnotes:
  - Materials for the Hist. of Thomas Becket, ed. Robertson (Rolls Ser.), vol. iii. contains Fitzstephen's Vita Sti Thomæ
  - Roger of Hoveden, ed. Stubbs (Rolls Ser.), vol. ii.
  - Madox's Hist. of the Exchequer (ed. 1769), vols. i. and ii.
  - Foss's Judges, vol. i; Wright's Biographia Literaria, vol. ii.
  - Hardy's Cat. of Manuscript Materials for Hist. of Great Britain and Ireland, ii.
