= Reginald Fitzurse =

12th-century Anglo-Norman nobleman and assassin of Thomas Becket

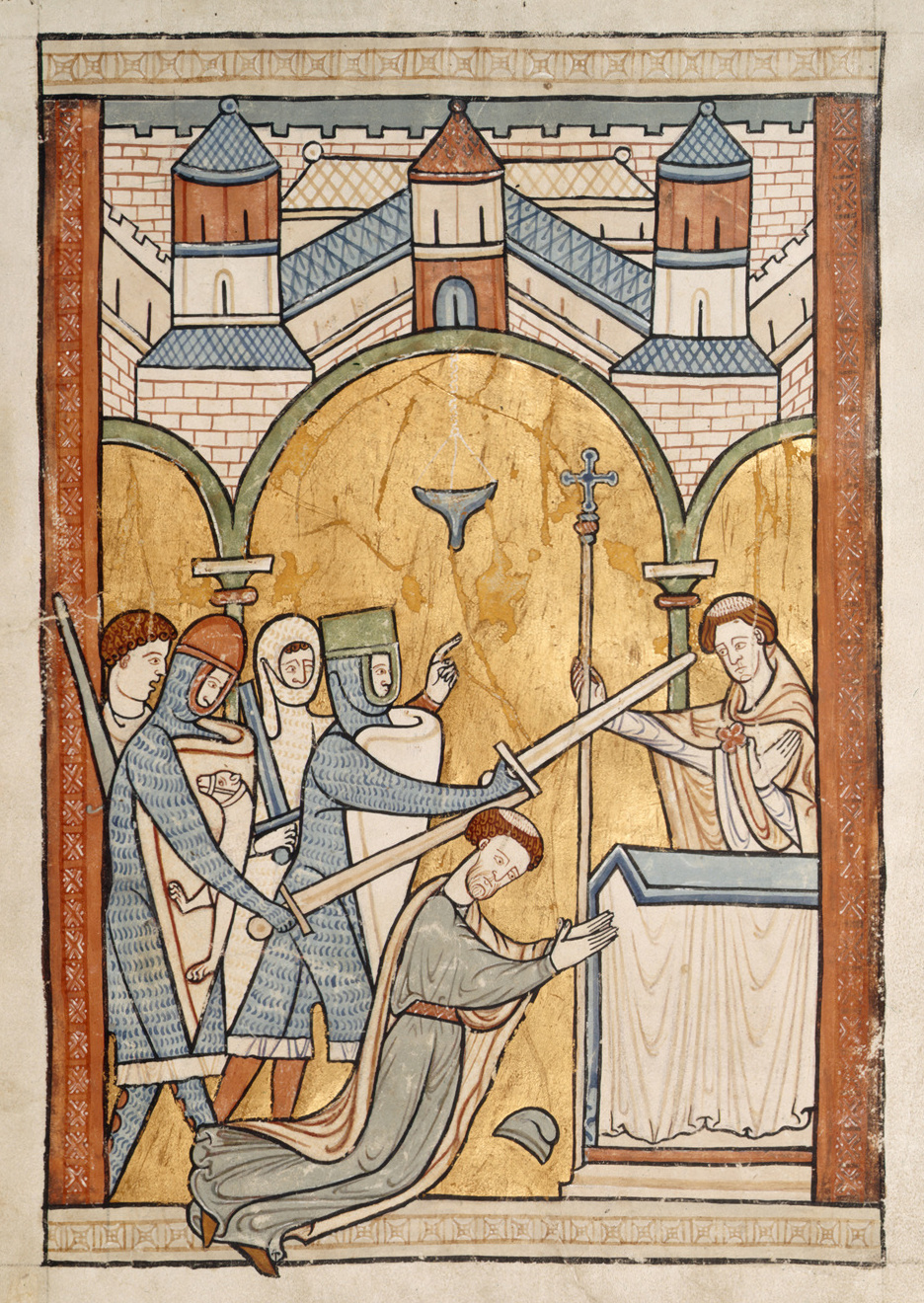
Contemporary drawing portraying the murder of Becket. The cognizance of a bear can be seen on the shield of Fitzurse

Sir Reginald Fitzurse (1145–1173) was one of the four knights who murdered Thomas Becket in 1170. His name is derived from Fitz, the Anglo-Norman French term meaning "son of" and urse meaning a bear, likely the nom de guerre of an ancestor. Although he lived before the true age of heraldry, which developed in the early 13th century, his shield bore the cognizance of a bear, which is visible in a contemporary drawing portraying the murder of Becket.

== Early life ==
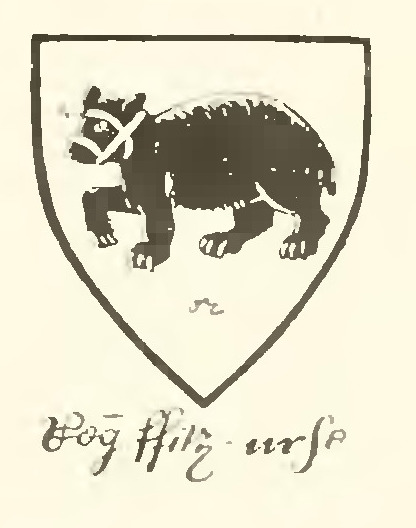
Reginald Fitz Urse shield, "bore, or, a bear passant sable, muzzled argent"

Fitzurse was the eldest son of Richard Fitzurse, on whose death about 1168 he inherited the manor of Williton, Somersetshire. He also held land in Leicestershire and Northamptonshire and at Barham, Kent, between Canterbury and Dover. He lived for a time at Barham Court in Teston. He was a knight in Henry II's household.

== Assassination of Becket ==
At Christmas 1170, Fitzurse was at the court of Henry II at Bures in Normandy when Henry ranted against Thomas Becket. Fitzurse and the other three knights, Hugh de Moreville, William de Tracy and Richard le Breton or Brito, crossed the Channel separately and met up in Saltwood Castle, Kent, to plan their attack.

On 29 December 1170, they burst into the cathedral choir at Canterbury clad in armour and carrying swords determined to capture or kill Becket. Fitzurse appeared to be the ringleader and delivered the first but non-fatal blow to Becket's head and the other knights followed suit until Becket lay dead. Christendom was outraged while the king publicly expressed remorse and engaged in public confession and penance.

The four knights initially escaped to Scotland and thence to Morville's Knaresborough Castle where they stayed for a year. All four were excommunicated by Pope Alexander III on Easter Day and ordered to make a penitential pilgrimage to the Holy Land, staying for 14 years. It is believed that none returned.

Legend holds that Fitzurse fled to Ireland where he fathered the McMahon clan. Fitzurse's relatives, who remained in England, changed their name to 'de Bereham' (of Barham), the location of their home, to also avoid any persecution. The name has evolved over time to just Barham.

== Marriage and Issue ==
Reginald married Beatrice de Limesi; they had one daughter, Matilda Fitzurse. She married Robert de Courtney and had issue.
