= Hugh de Morville, Lord of Westmorland =

12th-century Anglo-Norman nobleman and assassin of Thomas Becket

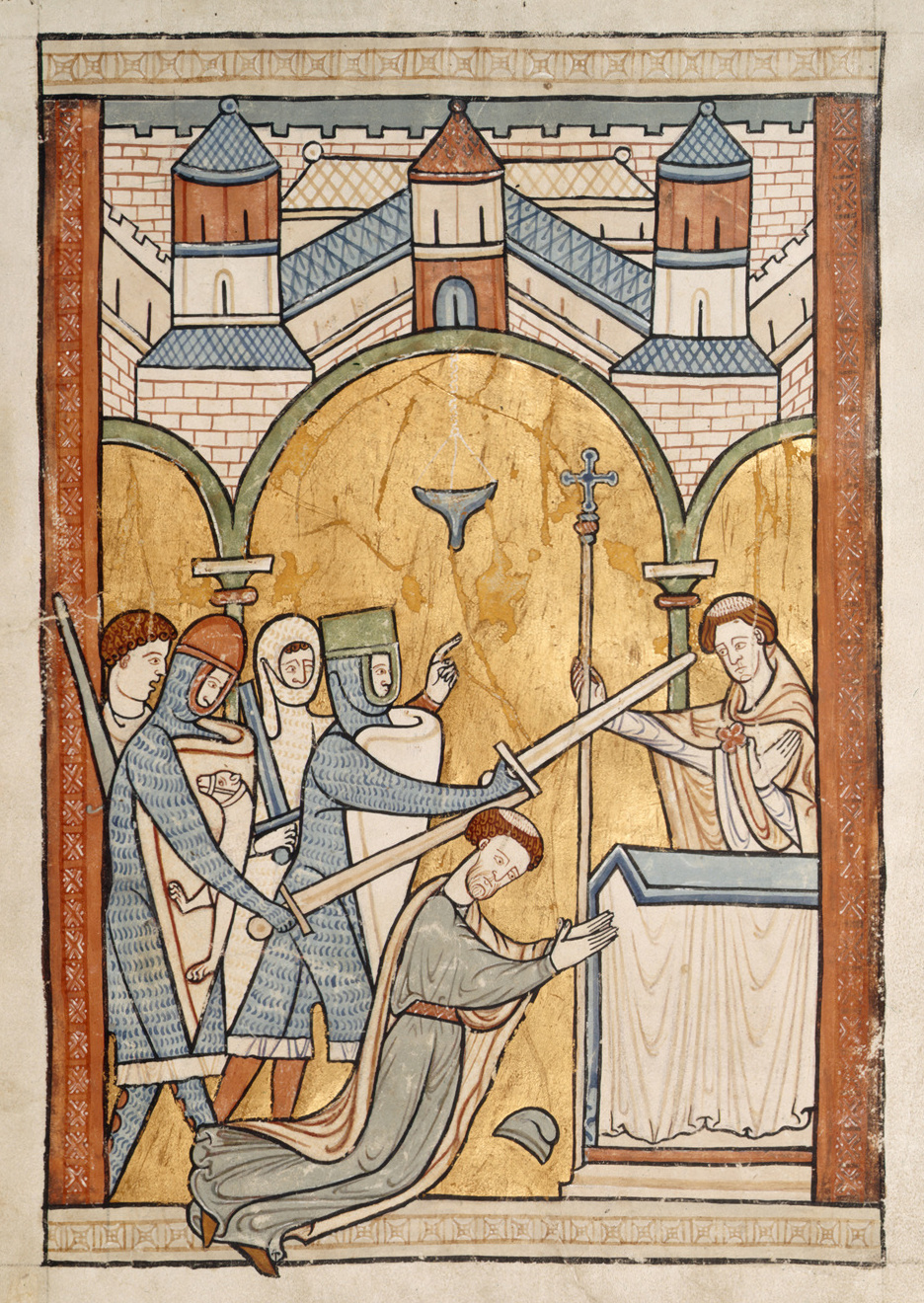
13th-century depiction of Thomas Becket's murder; Hugh de Morville was among the assassins.

Hugh de Morville (died c. 1173) was an Anglo-Norman knight who served King Henry II of England in the late 12th century. He is chiefly famous as one of the assassins of Thomas Becket, Archbishop of Canterbury in 1170. He held the title Lord of Westmorland and of Knaresborough; his father was Hugh de Morville, Constable of Scotland.

== Westmorland ==
Hugh is thought to have been his father's eldest son. He appears in the service of King Henry from 1158. University of Edinburgh historian Geoffrey W. S. Barrow identifies two charters were given by the younger Hugh in his capacity as Lord of Westmorland, one being read aloud to his court at his castle of Appleby on the upper River Eden. One of the witnesses was Harvard de Malnurs, Constable of Knaresborough Castle. Malnurs' rare surname may refer to a hamlet in the northern French province of Maine, now called La Malnoyere at La Rouaudière. Reginald de Beauchamp, who witnessed both charters, may have been a relative of Hugh's mother Beatrice, daughter of Roger de Beauchamp of Bedford.

Another mentioned, Peter de Lacelas, appears to be a kinsman of Gerard de Lacelles and his son Alan, who was firmly established as tenants of the de Morville's in Westmorland. Alan de Lascelles was captured with his lord at the siege of Alnwick Castle in July 1174. Lascelles has a Beauchamp rather than a Morville association, for Loucelles, whence the name was derived, is one of a small group of parishes between Bayeux and Caen from which the Beauchamps of Bedford drew their vassals of knightly rank.

== Becket's murder – excommunication and exile ==
Hugh de Morville and three other of King Henry II's knights, Reginald Fitzurse, William de Tracy and Richard le Breton (or de Brito), plotted Thomas Becket's murder after interpreting the king's angry words (supposedly "What miserable drones and traitors have I nourished and brought up in my household, who let their lord be treated with such shameful contempt by a low-born cleric?") as a command. They assassinated the archbishop in Canterbury Cathedral on 29 December 1170. After Henry advised them to flee to Scotland, they subsequently took refuge in de Morville's Knaresborough Castle.

Hugh de Morville, Richard de Brito and William de Tracy built a church at Alkborough, near Scunthorpe in today's North Lincolnshire, where, until 1690, an inscribed stone on the chancel recorded the benefaction. This benefaction failed to impress Pope Alexander III, however, who excommunicated Tracy and the other murderers on Maundy Thursday, 25 March 1171. Tracy paid scutage on his lands in 1171 and set out for Rome after the end of September but before Henry II's expedition to Ireland in October. The departure of Hugh de Morville and the other knights to Rome was delayed until two of them, Fitzurse and de Morville, had taken part in the rebellion against the king in 1173–74. The Archbishop's murderers finally gained their audience with the Pope, who, despite their penitence, decreed they should be exiled and fight "in knightly arms in The Temple for 14 years" in Jerusalem, and after the given time return to Rome.

== Vassal of Richard I of England ==
A Hugh de Morville, son of Simon and nephew of Hugh the Murderer, appears in the service of the Crusader king Richard I in the 1190s. He stood hostage for Richard in 1194 when the king had been captured by Henry VI, Holy Roman Emperor. The German poet Ulrich von Zatzikhoven wrote that a Huc von Morville brought with him the French-language sourcebook for his romance Lanzelet (Lancelot). Dahood finds it improbable that Hugh of Knaresborough was the same individual.

== Death and burial ==
William de Tracy's journey east is confirmed by Romwald, Archbishop of Salerno, and Roger of Hoveden, who report that the Pope instructed the knights, once their duties were fulfilled, to visit the holy places barefoot and in hair shirts and then to live alone for the rest of their lives on the Black Mountain near Antioch, spending their time in vigil, prayer, and lamentation. Romwald continues that, after their deaths, the bodies of the knights were buried at Jerusalem before the door of the temple, though this does not conform exactly to the tradition that the murderers were buried under the portico in front of the Al-Aqsa Mosque, which was the refectory of the Knights Templar. Another tradition is that the bodies of the knights were returned to the island of Brean Down, off the coast of Weston-super-Mare, and buried there.

The lordship of Westmorland passed to Hugh's sister (some sources say niece), Maud, in 1174; she held the lands until Hugh's expiation.
