= Edward Grim =

Monastic witness to the murder of Thomas Becket

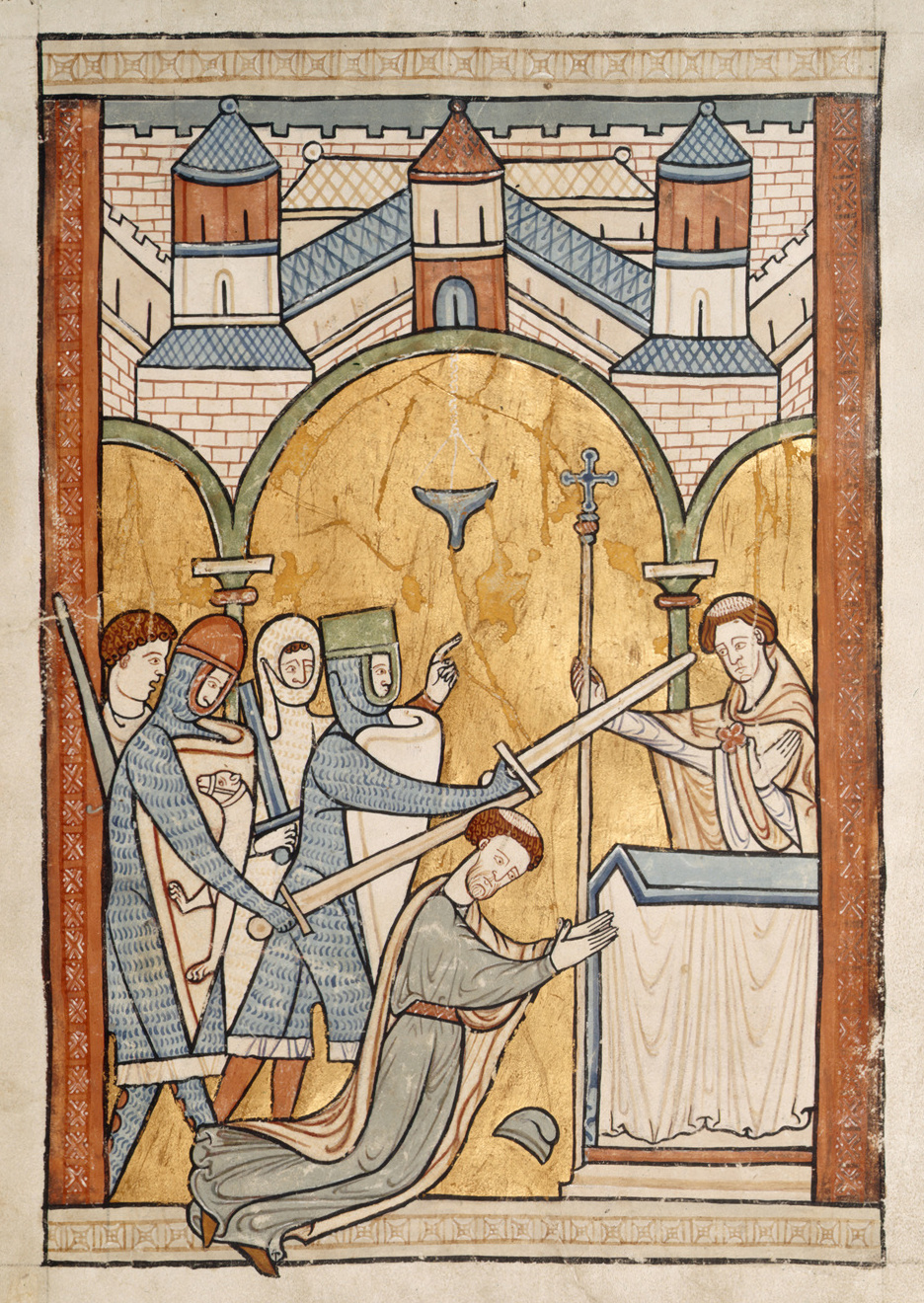
Thirteenth-century manuscript illumination depicting Thomas Becket's assassination - Edward Grim (right) trying to protect Becket

Edward Grim (died c. 1189) was a monk from Cambridge who visited Canterbury Cathedral on Tuesday 29 December 1170, when Thomas Becket was murdered. He researched and published a book, Vita S. Thomae (Life of St. Thomas) in about 1180, which is today known chiefly for a short section in which he gave an eyewitness account of the events in the cathedral.

On the day of the murder, Grim was with Becket in Canterbury Cathedral. He stood by Becket during Becket's altercation with the knights. He attempted to protect Becket from their attack until, his arm was nearly cut off by a stroke aimed at the archbishop, and he fell to the ground. He was able to crawl away to the altar where the other archbishop's clerks had hidden, and escaped with his life.

His Vita S. Thomae cannot have been completed earlier than 1174 as it contains an account of the penance of Henry II; another passage seems to show that it was written not later than 1177 (Materials, ii. 448–9; cf. Magnusson, pref. to Thomas Saga, ii. lxxxii). As it would seem that Grim did not meet Becket until a few days before the latter's death, his information concerning the archbishop's life must be considered second-hand apart from the last scenes to which he was an eye-witness. A large part of his narrative closely resembles that of the French poet Garnier (or Guernes) de Pont-Sainte-Maxence, who completed his own work in 1175. Whether Grim copied Garnier or Garnier copied Grim is not certain, but the former is most likely. Grim was dead before Herbert of Bosham finished his work on St. Thomas, i.e. by 1186, or at latest 1189.

== See also ==
- William Fitzstephen
