= Knaresborough Castle =

Ruined fortress in North Yorkshire, England

- Knaresborough, North Yorkshire, England
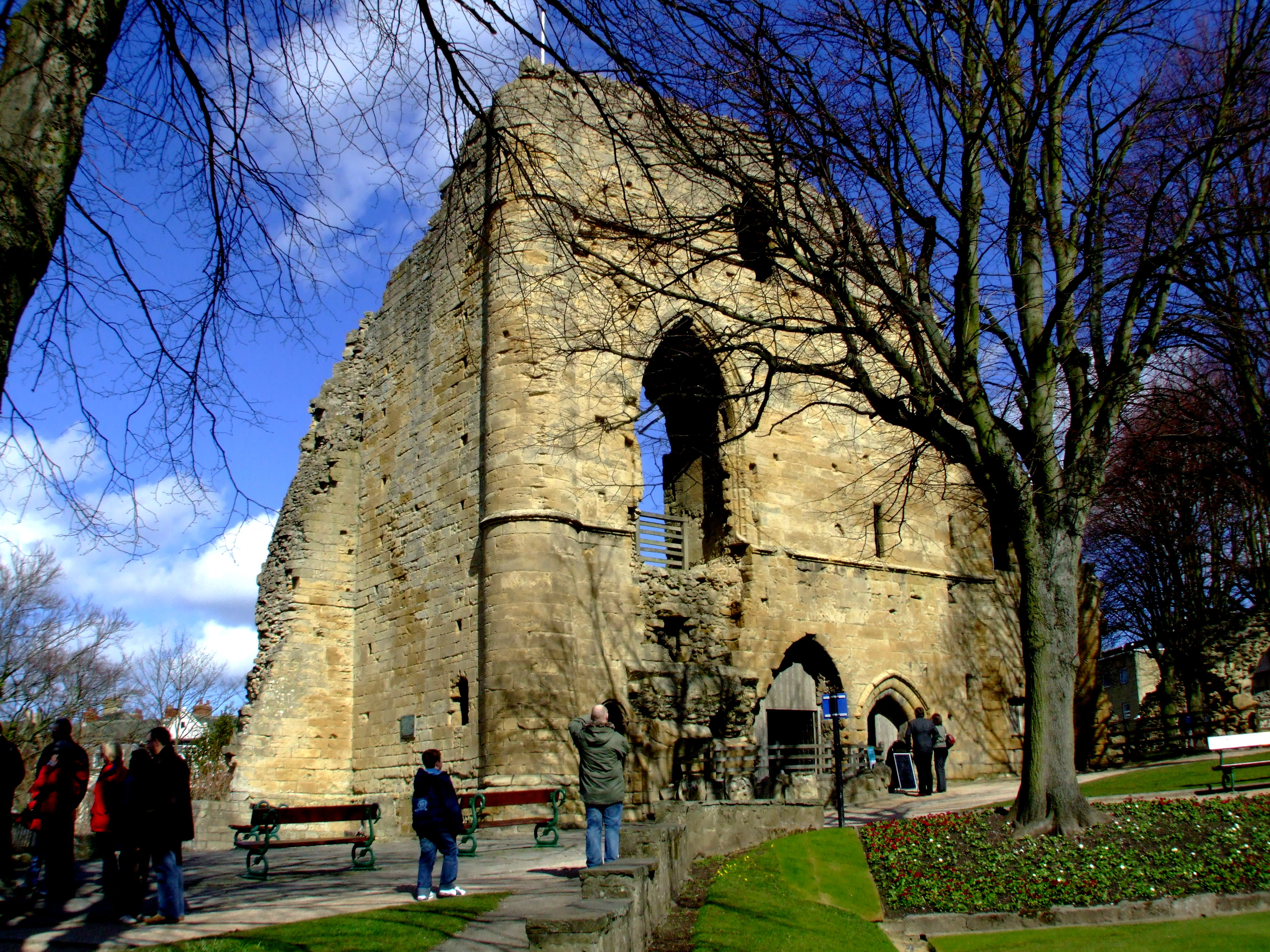
- The ruins of the keep of Knaresborough Castle.

Site information
- Type: Castle
- Owner: Duchy of Lancaster
- Controlled by: North Yorkshire Council
- Open to the public: Yes
- Condition: Ruined

Location
- Shown within North Yorkshire
- Coordinates: 54.00719°N 1.46932°W

Site history
- Built: Around 1100, rebuilt 1301–1307
- In use: Until 1648

Knaresborough Castle is a ruined fortress overlooking the River Nidd in the town of Knaresborough, North Yorkshire, England.

== History ==
The castle was first built by a Norman baron in c. 1100 on a cliff above the River Nidd. There is documentary evidence dating from 1130 referring to works carried out at the castle by Henry I. In the 1170s Hugh de Moreville and his followers took refuge there after assassinating Thomas Becket.

William de Stuteville was appointed as Governor of Knaresborough castle in Easter 1173. After de Stuteville's death in 1203, King John gave Hubert Walter, Archbishop of Canterbury, custody of all of William de Stuteville's lands and castles and the wardship of his son and heir Robert de Stuteville. However, Robert died in 1205 and William's brother Nicholas de Stuteville became William's heir. A charter dated at Lambeth 5 August 1205 confirmed that Nicholas had paid a fine of 10,000 marks for his inheritance, with the exception of the castles of Knaresborough and Boroughbridge, which were retained by the King.

The King regarded Knaresborough as an important northern fortress and spent £1,290 on improvements to the castle. In August 1304, Elizabeth of Rhuddlan, a daughter of Edward I, travelled from Linlithgow Palace to Knaresborough Castle. She gave birth to her son, Humphrey, in September, assisted by a holy relic of the girdle of the Virgin, brought especially from Westminster Abbey.

The castle was rebuilt at a cost of £2,174 between 1307 and 1312 by Edward I and completed by Edward II, including the great keep. Edward II gave the castle to Piers Gaveston and stayed there himself when the unpopular nobleman was besieged at Scarborough Castle.

Philippa of Hainault took possession of the castle in 1331, at which point it became a royal residence. The queen often spent summers there with her family. Her son, John of Gaunt acquired the castle in 1372, adding it to the vast holdings of the Duchy of Lancaster. Katherine Swynford, Gaunt's third wife, obtained the castle upon his death.

A detailed survey of the state of the castle buildings was made in 1561. The building was used by estate auditors and law courts were held in the hall.

The castle was taken by Parliamentarian troops in 1644 during the Civil War and largely destroyed in 1648, not as the result of warfare but because of an order from Parliament to dismantle all Royalist castles. Indeed many town-centre buildings are built of 'castle stone'.

== Present day ==
The remains of the castle are open to the public and there is a charge for entry to the interior remains. The grounds are used as a public leisure space, with a bowling green and putting green open during the summer. It is also used as a performing space. It plays host to frequent events, such as the annual FEVA (Festival of Visual Arts and Entertainment). The property is owned by the monarch as part of the Duchy of Lancaster holdings, but is administered by North Yorkshire Council.

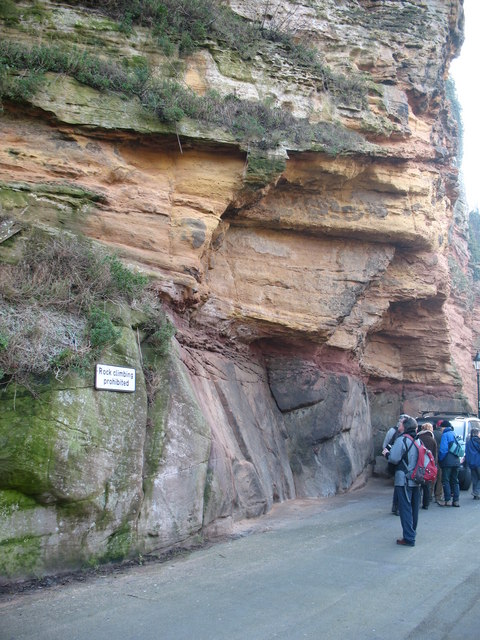
Crags below Knaresborough Castle. There is an unconformity between mid-Carboniferous sandstones at the road level and late Permian grits and limestones above.

Knaresborough castle has had ravens since 2000, one of which was given by the Tower of London, and an African pied crow named Mourdour. In 2018, Mourdour was filmed greeting people at the castle in a Yorkshire accent, saying "Y'alright love?" The video subsequently went viral and was reported by various news broadcasters.

== Description ==
The castle, now much ruined, comprised two walled baileys set one behind the other, with the outer bailey on the town side and the inner bailey on the cliff side. The enclosure wall was punctuated by solid towers along its length, and a pair, visible today, formed the main gate. At the junction between the inner and outer baileys, on the north side of the castle stood a tall five-sided keep, the eastern parts of which have been pulled down. The keep had a vaulted basement, at least three upper storeys, and served as a residence for the lord of the castle throughout the castle's history. The castle baileys contained residential buildings, and some foundations have survived. In 1789, historian Ely Hargrove wrote that the castle contained "only three rooms on a floor, and measures, in front, only fifty-four feet."

=== Courthouse ===
The former court house in the grounds was built in the 14th century probably as House of Records, and is now a museum. It was extended in the 16th and 18th centuries, and was restored in 1830 and again in the 20th century. The museum includes furniture from the original Tudor Court, as well as exhibits about the castle and the town. It is built of magnesian limestone and brick. The roof is in stone slate, with stone coping and a kneeler on the left, and hipped on the right. There are two storeys and five bays, and a single-storey two-bay extension at the rear. In the ground floor is a round-headed doorway with a hood mould, other doorways, and two horizontally-sliding sash windows. An external staircase leads up to a doorway in the upper floor with a chamfered surround and a basket arch. There are also five windows with chamfered surrounds, recessed mullions and stepped hood moulds. Inside, there is a 14th-century fireplace, 17th-century cupboards and doors, and benches and panelling from the 16th-century courtroom. The building is grade II listed.

=== Prison ===
Attached to the courthouse is a former prison, built in 1786. The prison, later used for other purposes, is in gritstone, with stone corbels carrying the gutters, and a hipped stone slate roof. There is a single storey with cells below, and one bay. On the front is a three-light segmental-headed window with a transom, and in the left return are two large round-headed windows. The prison is also grade II listed.
