= House on the Rock (disambiguation) =

The House on the Rock is a tourist attraction in Wisconsin, United States.

House on the Rock may also refer to:

- "House on the Rock" (American Gods), an episode of the television series American Gods
- House on the Rock (church), in Lagos, Nigeria
- House on the Rock (Sighișoara), an historic building in Romania
- Parable of the Wise and the Foolish Builders, a parable of Jesus

== See also ==
- The House in the Rock, building in England
