= Old Manor House =

Old Manor House is the name of:

== Buildings ==
- Knaresborough Old Manor House, North Yorkshire, England
- Mitford Old Manor House, Northumberland, England
- The Old Manor House, Clifton, North Yorkshire, England
- Old Manor House, Cottingham, East Riding of Yorkshire, England

== Other uses ==
- The Old Manor House, novel
