= Old Town Hall, Knaresborough =

Municipal building in Knaresborough, North Yorkshire, England

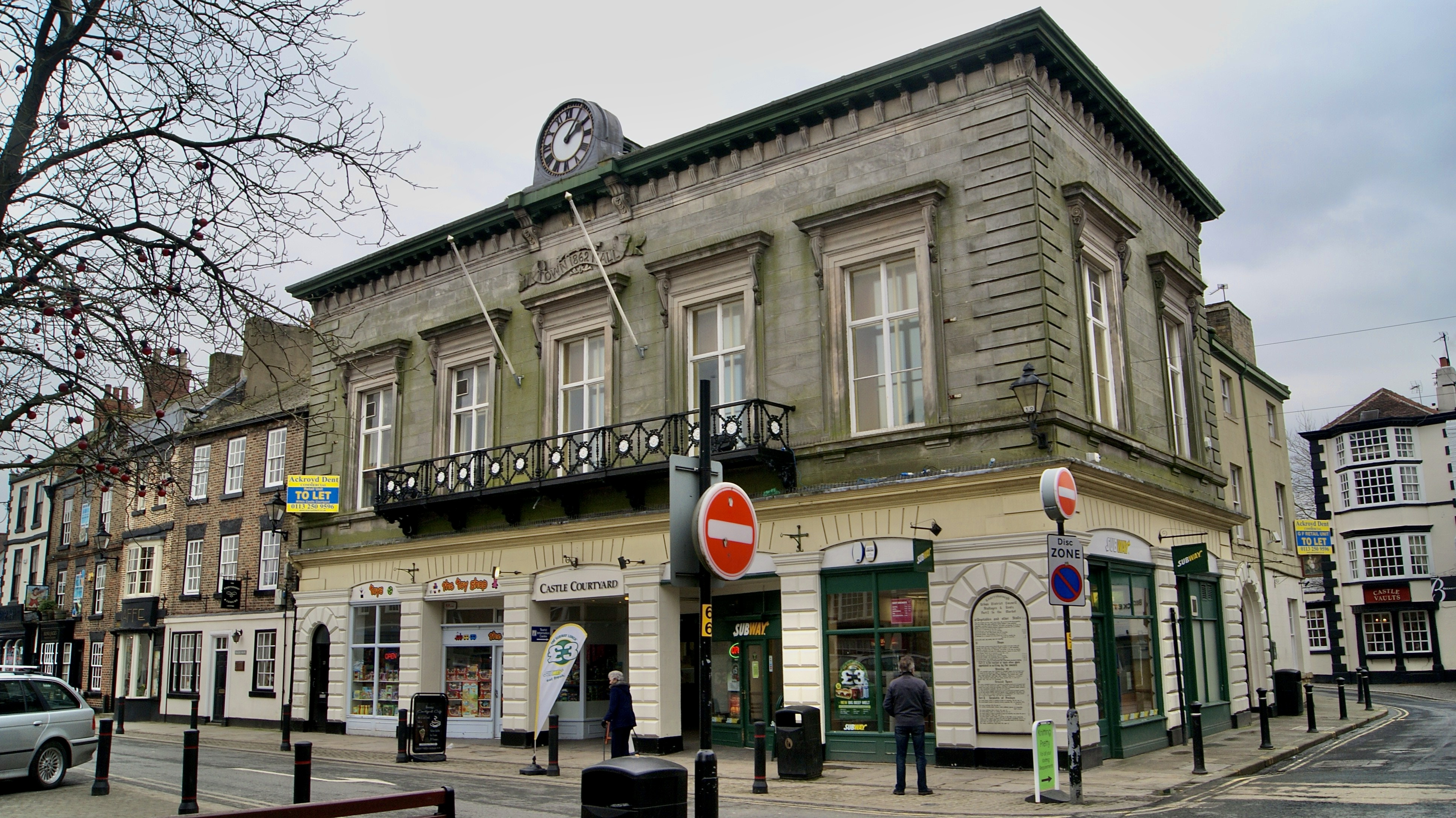
- Old Town Hall, Knaresborough

- Shown in North Yorkshire
- 54.0080°N 1.4674°W
- Location: Market Place, Knaresborough

History
- Built: 1862

Site notes
- Architect: John Child
- Architectural style: Neoclassical style

Listed Building – Grade II
- Official name: Nos 25,27,29 and 31 (Old Town Hall) with Additional Range on Right Return
- Designated: 12 December 1985
- Reference no.: 1315653

The Old Town Hall is a former municipal building in the Market Place, Knaresborough, North Yorkshire, England. The structure, which was used as an events venue by Knaresborough Urban District Council, is a Grade II listed building.

== History ==
The first municipal building in Knaresborough was an early 17th century toll booth, which was rebuilt as a sessions house with two prison cells in the basement in 1768. The sessions house was the venue for debtors court hearings once a fortnight and county court hearings once a year. In the mid-19th century civic officials decided to demolish the old sessions house and to erect a new town hall on the same site.

The foundation stone for the new building was laid by Sir Charles Slingsby, 10th Baronet of Scriven Hall who, as the lord of the manor, decided to make the site available at a nominal charge and also contributed to the cost of the construction. It was designed by John Child in the neoclassical style, built in ashlar stone at a cost of £3,000 and was completed in 1862. It was arcaded on the ground floor, so that markets could be held, with an assembly room on the first floor. The design involved a symmetrical main frontage with five bays facing onto the Market Place; a series of rusticated piers supported the first floor structure. On the first floor, there was a row of five cross-windows with architraves as well as a wrought iron balcony which could be accessed from any one of the three central windows. Above the middle window there was a carved scroll with the inscription "Town Hall" and the date of construction and, at roof level, there was a cornice with dentils and a central clock (by J. Bailey and Co. of Manchester). Local candidates who were standing for election to the UK Parliament delivered their election addresses on the balcony until the constituency was abolished in 1885.

Following significant population growth, largely associated with the status of Knaresborough as a market town, the area became an urban district in 1895. Although the new council used the town hall as a venue for civic events, council officers and their departments were located at the council offices in York Place, before moving to Knaresborough House in 1951. The arcading was enclosed with glazing in the early 20th century so allowing the ground floor to be used for retail purposes. During the Second World War, the officers and men of the 41st Royal Tank Regiment, who were based at Pannal Hall from October 1940 to February 1941, attended several concerts in the town hall before departing for North Africa and seeing action in the Second Battle of El Alamein.

The town hall was converted into a retail mall known as the "Castle Courtyard" in the late 20th century. The local tourist information office was among tenants accommodated in the retail mall and the assembly room was brought back into use as a nightclub.

== See also ==
- Listed buildings in Knaresborough
