= St Mary's Church, Knaresborough =

Church in Knaresborough, North Yorkshire, England

Coordinates: 54.0108°N 1.4726°W

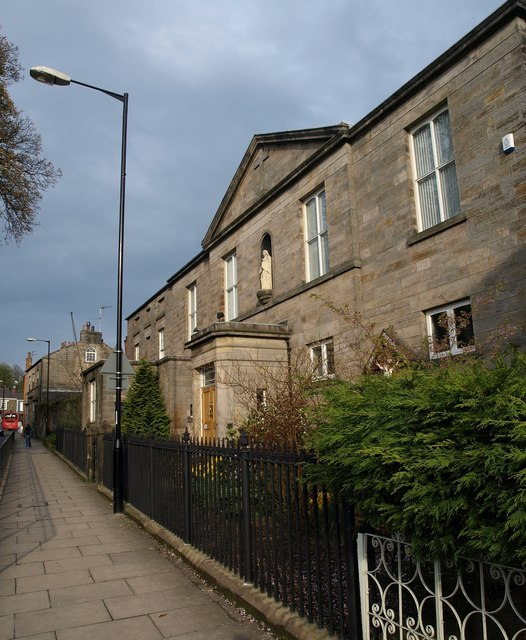
The church, in 2009

St Mary's Church is a Catholic church in Knaresborough, a town in North Yorkshire, in England.

Catholics in Knaresborough worshipped in Follifoot from 1750. In 1797, a linen factory in the town was converted into a chapel and priest's house. The current church was purpose-built between 1831 and 1832, in the style of a private house. It is said to have reused the foundations of St Hilda's Chapel, Rudfarlington. It was remodelled inside in 1973, and was reordered in 2001, when the sanctuary was moved to the south wall, the organ gallery was removed, and the entrance moved to the rear. The church was grade II listed in 1968.

The church is built of gritstone, with a sill band, a lintel band, an eaves cornice, and a Westmorland slate roof. It has two storeys and a front of five bays, the middle three bays projecting under a pediment containing a cross in relief. In the centre is a projecting porch, now converted into a chapel, above which is a round-arched niche containing a statue. Most of the windows are sashes. Inside, the original ceiling survives, but the other fittings date from the late 20th and early 21st centuries.

The neighbouring presbytery is also grade II listed. It is built of gritstone, and has a hipped Westmorland slate roof. It has three storeys and three bays. In the centre is a doorway with a fanlight, and to its right is a bay window. To the left, and in the middle floor, are sash windows, and the top floor contains three blind windows.

== See also ==
- Listed buildings in Knaresborough
