= Commercial Hotel, Knaresborough =

Pub in Knaresborough, North Yorkshire, England

Coordinates: 54°00′33″N 1°28′05″W

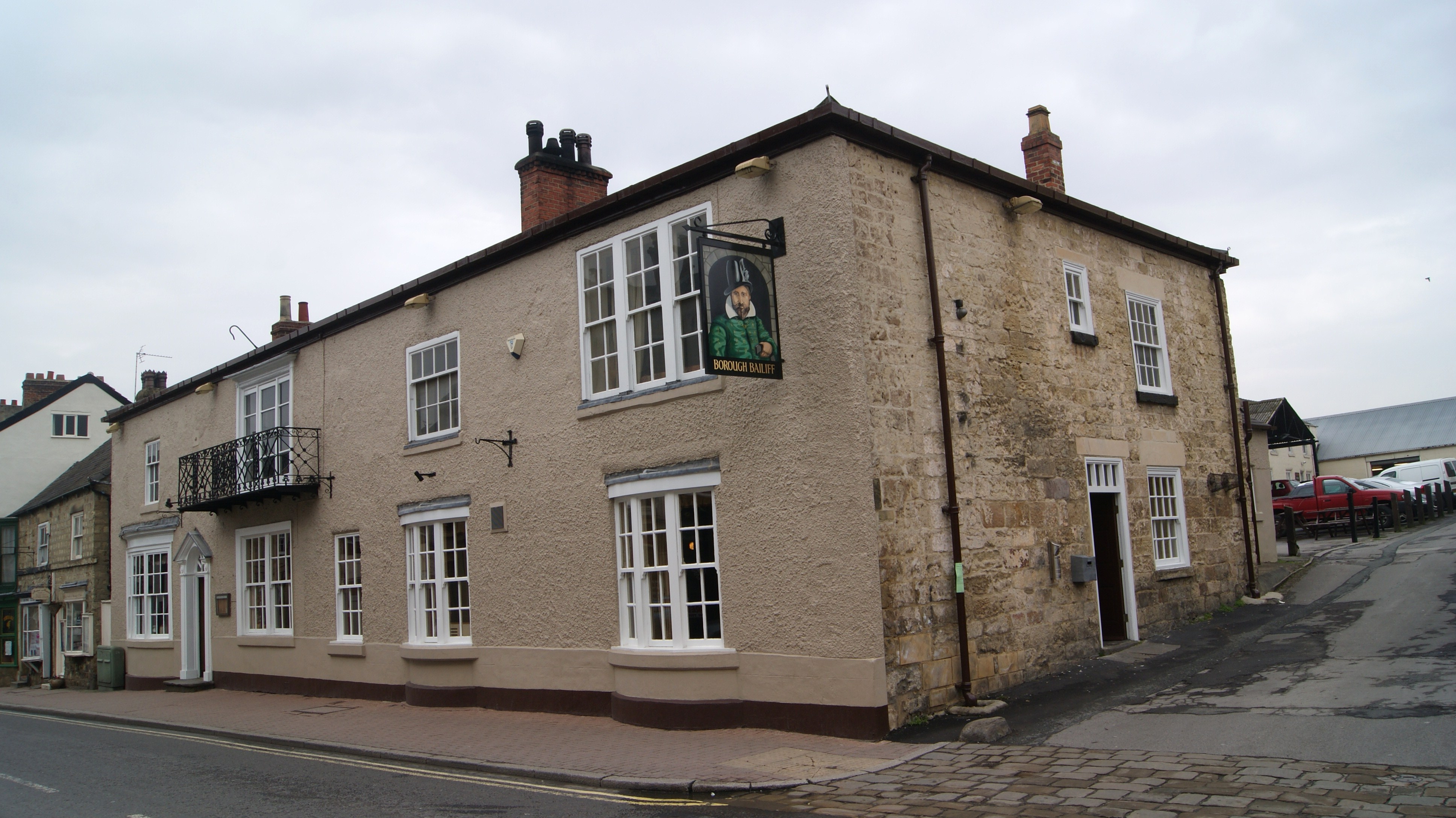
The pub in 2013, while named the Borough Bailiff

The Commercial Hotel is a historic pub in Knaresborough, a town in North Yorkshire, in England.

The building was constructed in the 16th century, as a house. In the 17th century, the town bailiff, Peter Benson, owned the property. In about 1720, it was converted into an inn, the Commercial Hotel. The front of the building was replaced around the middle of the century. The building was restored in the 1930s, and again in 1976. It was grade II listed in 1952. In the early 21st century, it was known as the Borough Bailiff, but it was later acquired by Samuel Smith's Old Brewery and reverted to its original name.

The pub has a timber framed core, it is encased in rendered limestone, and has a hipped Westmorland slate roof. There are two storeys and four bays. The doorway has fluted pilasters with paterae, a fanlight, and a triangular pediment. On the front are three bow windows, and the other windows are sashes. Under the upper floor window in the second bay is a decorative wrought iron balcony. Inside, there is a 17th-century staircase at the rear.

== See also ==
- Listed buildings in Knaresborough
