= Oldest Chemist Shop in England =

Building in Knaresborough, North Yorkshire, England

Coordinates: 54°00′29″N 1°28′01″W

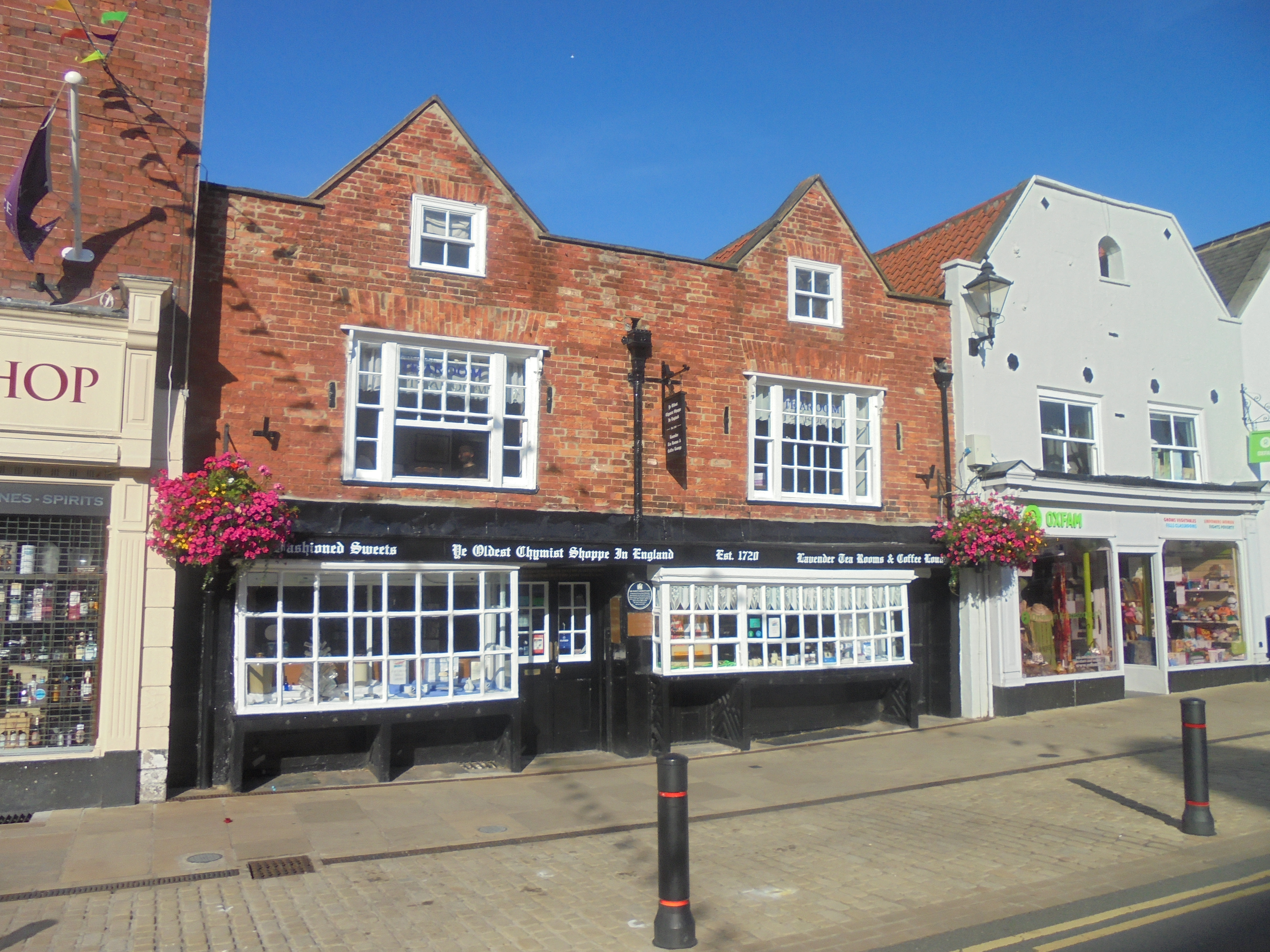
The building, in 2019

The Oldest Chemist Shop in England is a historic building in Knaresborough, a town in North Yorkshire, in England.

The building was constructed in the 17th century. In 1720, the apothecary John Beckwith began running his business from the building, and it continued to operate as a pharmacy until 1998. It has since operated as a gift shop, with the fittings from the pharmacy remaining in place. In 2001, the first floor was converted into a tearoom. The shop continues to sell a lavender water concotion which was made on the premises in the 19th century.

The shop has a timber framed core, it is encased in brick on the front, and has a pantile roof. There are two storeys and attics, and two gabled bays. In the ground floor are central double doors flanked by bow windows with decorative wooden posts. The upper floor contains tripartite sash windows, in the left bay of the attic is a four-light sash window, and the other bay contains a painted replica. Inside the shop are surviving timber framing, 18th-century shop fittings, and 17th-century panelling and stairs. The building has been grade II listed since 1952.

== See also ==
- Listed buildings in Knaresborough
