= Castle Mill, Knaresborough =

Watermill in Knaresborough, North Yorkshire, England

Coordinates: 54.0063°N 1.4710°W

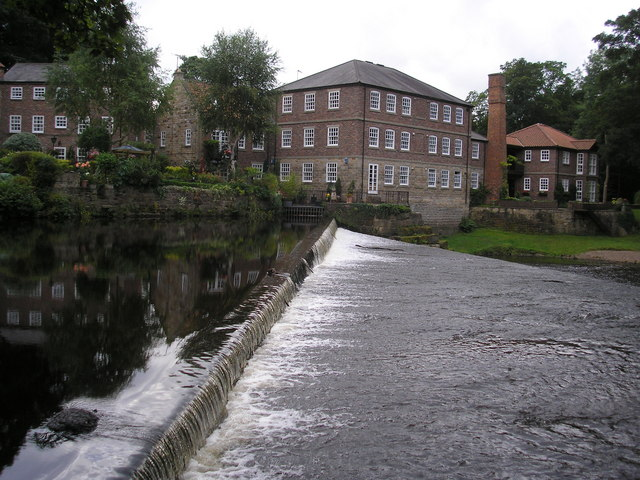
The mill, seen across the River Nidd. The original building is in the centre, with the central range to its left, and the central building on the far left.

Castle Mill is a historic watermill in Knaresborough, a town in North Yorkshire, in England.

The complex lies on the side of a corn mill. In 1770, it was rebuilt as a paper mill, and in 1791 it was converted to spin cotton, with a new building added. In the 1810s, it switched to spinning flax, and the 1791 building was replaced. In the late 1840s, the mill was taken over by Walton, Gates and Simpson, who added power looms and a steam engine. In the 1860s, it switched from spinning to weaving linen. The company later became Walton & Co, and it continued weaving until 1972, and left the premises entirely in 1984. Between 1986 and 1987, the complex was converted into housing. Several buildings on the site are grade II listed.

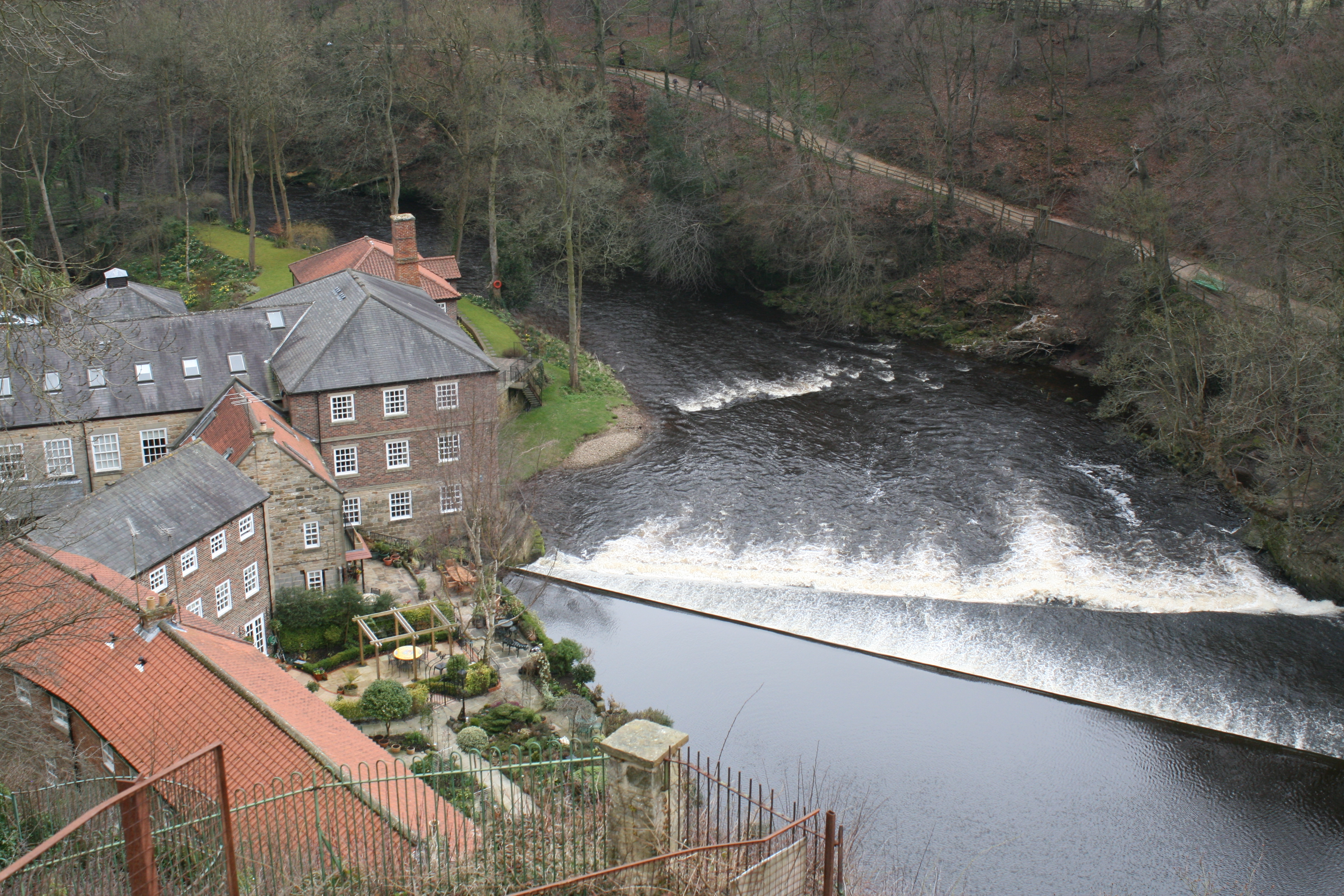
View of the mill from the hillside above

The original mill building dates from 1770, although it is possible that parts of the walls survive from the older corn mill. It is built of gritstone on the ground floor and in brick above, and has floor bands and a hipped Westmorland slate roof. It is built over the mill race, and has three storeys, and fronts of seven and three bays. The windows are sashes in architraves, those in the upper two floors with cambered heads.

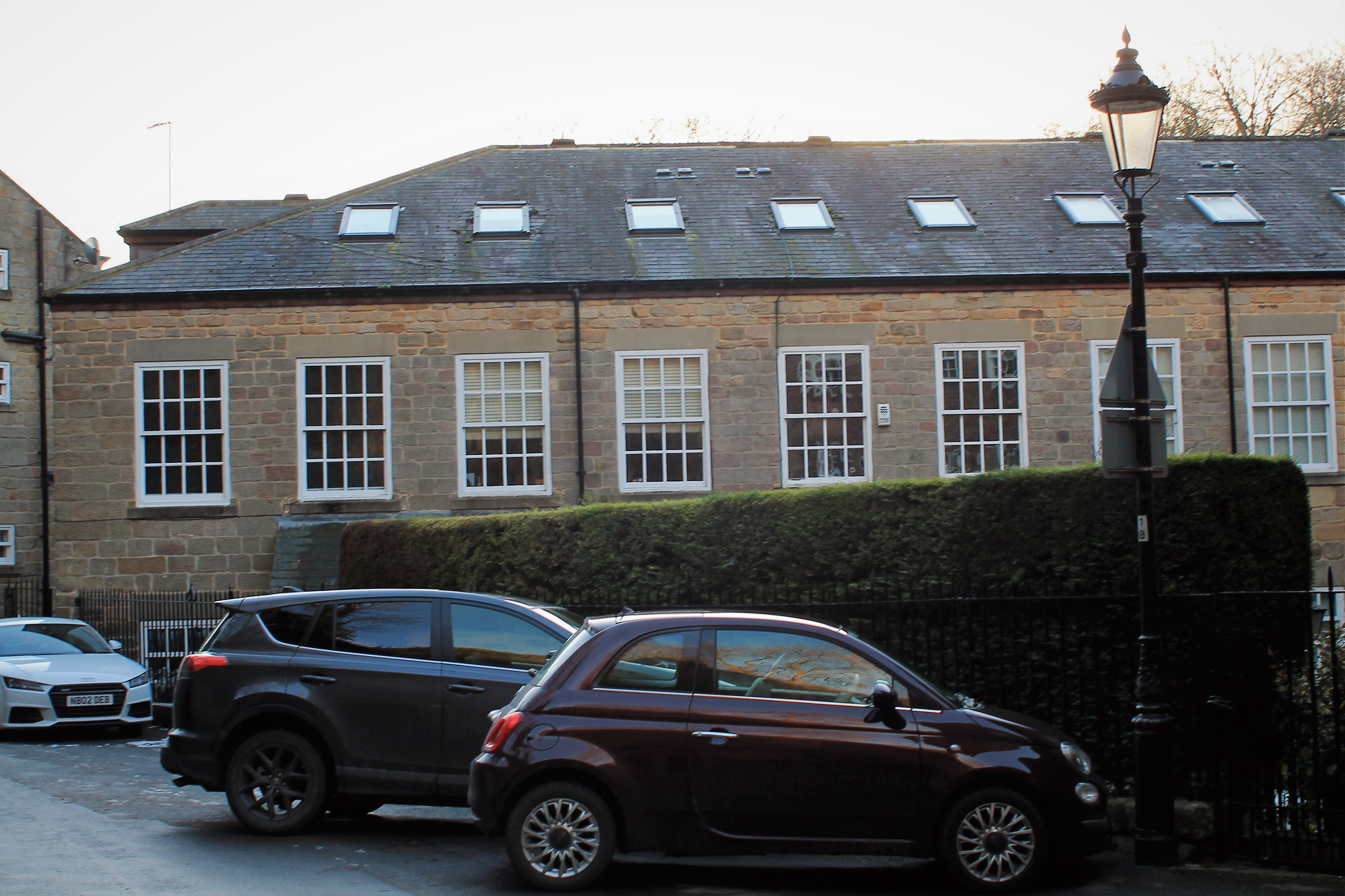
The weaving shed

The weaving shed, adjoining the original mill building, dates from the 1810s. It is built of gritstone with a hipped Westmorland slate roof. There are two storeys, eleven bays on the front, and three on the return. The windows are large horizontally-sliding sashes, and in the left return is a loading door with a pulley rail.

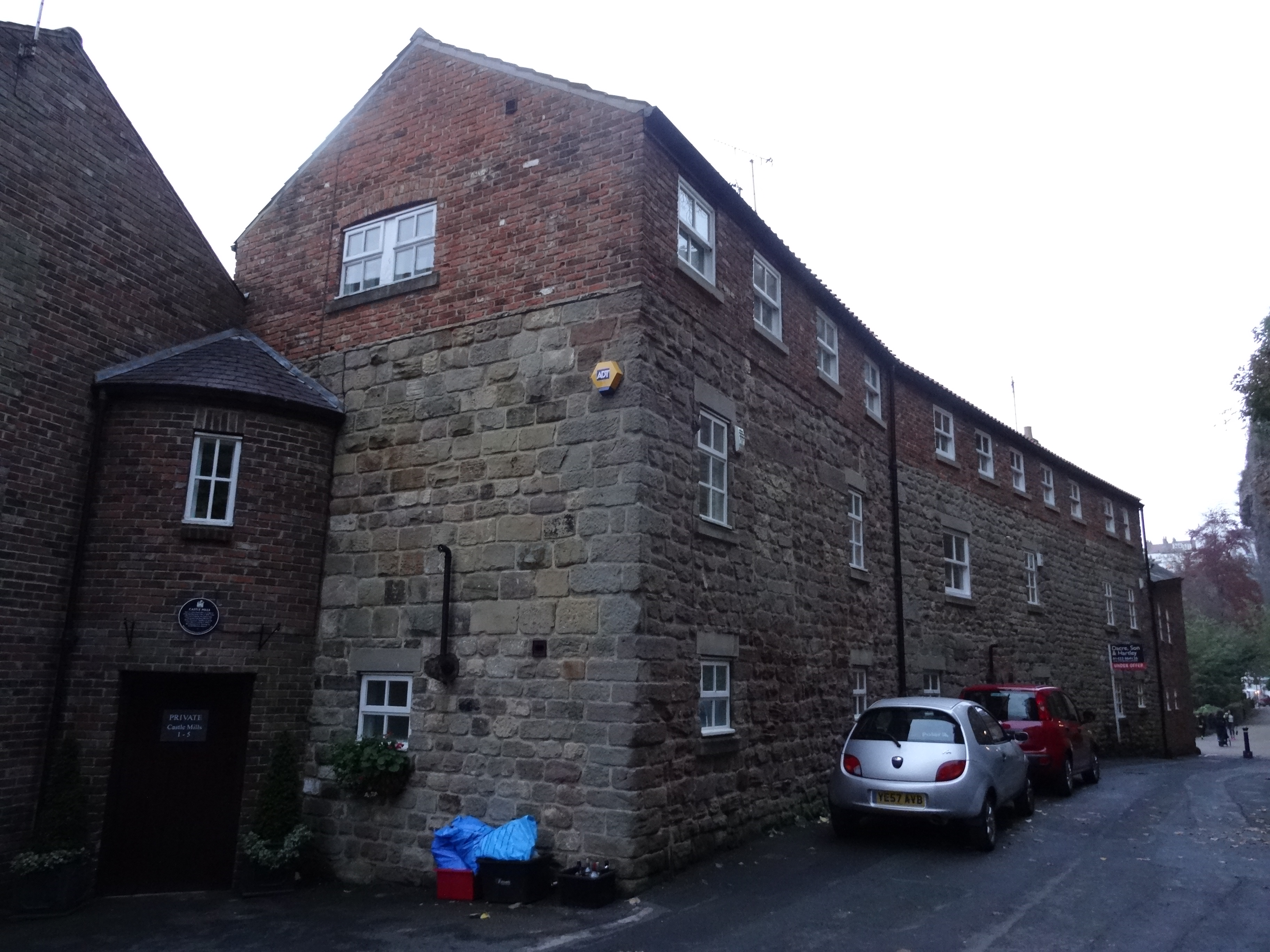
Northern mill building

The northern mill building was originally a cottage, built in about 1800. Further cottages were constructed on either side in the early 19th century, and then an adjoining warehouse in the 1850s. The internal walls of the cottages were demolished in the 1860s, and the building became a workshop, while the warehouse was rebuilt in 1879. The building is constructed of gritstone and brick, with roofs of pantile and Westmorland slate. It has three storeys and ten bays, following the curve of the road, and a two-storey three-bay brick extension to the north. On the east front is a loading door, and the windows are a mix of sashes, some horizontally-sliding, and square windows; some windows are blocked. At the south end is a two-storey porch linking the building with the central building.

The central building was constructed in the 1840s of brick on a stone plinth, with sandstone details, quoins and a stone slate roof. It has three storeys and five bays. The windows are sashes, and some are blocked.

Between the central building and the weaving shed is the central range, probably built in 1770 as the owner's house, but converted into a workshop and warehouse by the 1820s. The mill building is constructed of rendered stone and brick, and has a stone slate roof with courses of Westmorland slate, a stone ridge, and stone gable coping and a kneeler on the right. There are two storeys and four bays. The windows are sashes, some horizontally-sliding, and some in architraves.

== See also ==
- Listed buildings in Knaresborough
