= High Bridge, Knaresborough =

Road bridge in Knaresborough, North Yorkshire, England

Coordinates: 54°00′32″N 1°28′30″W

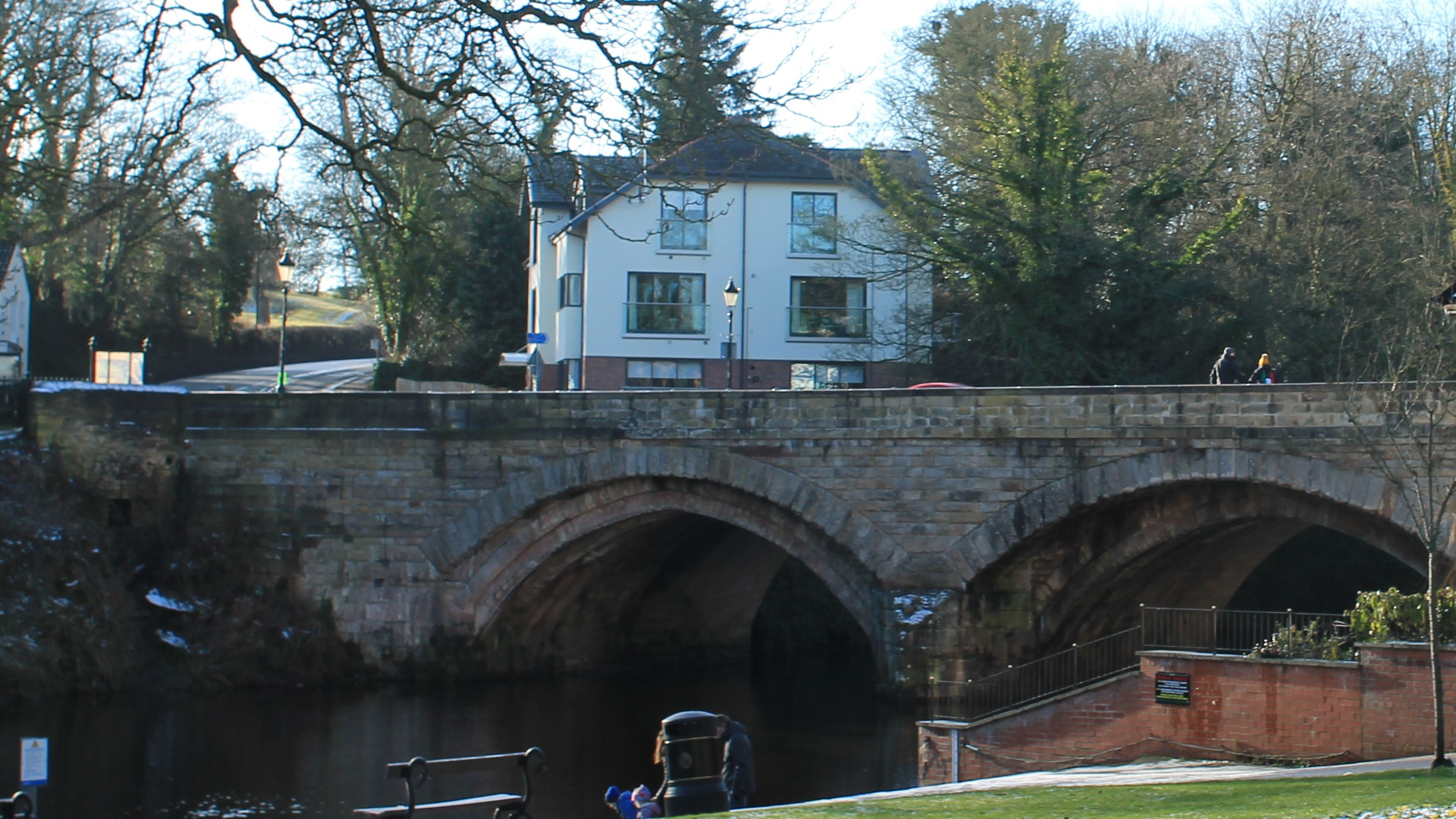
The bridge, in 2019

High Bridge is a historic bridge over the River Nidd in Knaresborough, a town in North Yorkshire, in England.

A bridge over the river at this location was first recorded in 1200. The bridge was built in stone in the 14th century, three metres wide with rib vaulting and pointed arches. It was rebuilt in 1773, incorporating the original structure but four metres wide and with skewed end points on the banks, and a toll gate was added. The bridge was widened upstream in the 19th century, and in the 1920s, it was widened on both sides, and new parapets were constructed. It was grade II listed in 1952.

The bridge carries Harrogate Road (A59 road). It is built of gritstone and sandstone and consists of two segmental arches with voussoirs. The bridge has pointed cutwaters on both sides and chamfered ribs, and a footpath has been built on the downstream side.

== See also ==
- Listed buildings in Knaresborough
