= Newton House, Knaresborough =

House in Knaresborough, North Yorkshire, England

Coordinates: 54°00′26″N 1°27′51″W

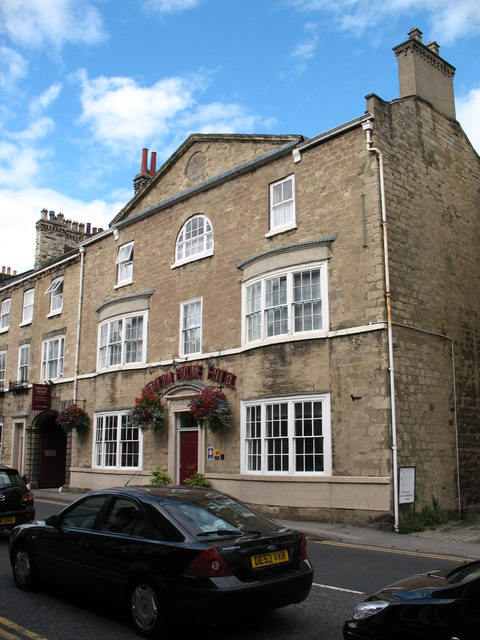
The building, in 2011

Newton House is a historic building in Knaresborough, a town in North Yorkshire, in England.

The house was built in the mid or late 18th century. Local tradition claims that it was built with stone from Knaresborough Castle. In the 20th century, it was combined with the house to its left, to form a hotel with twelve bedrooms. The owners appeared on the series "Four in a Bed" in 2016, winning the episode. In 2022, it was taken over by Lamb and Flag Enterprises. Both sections of the building have been separately grade II listed since 1952.

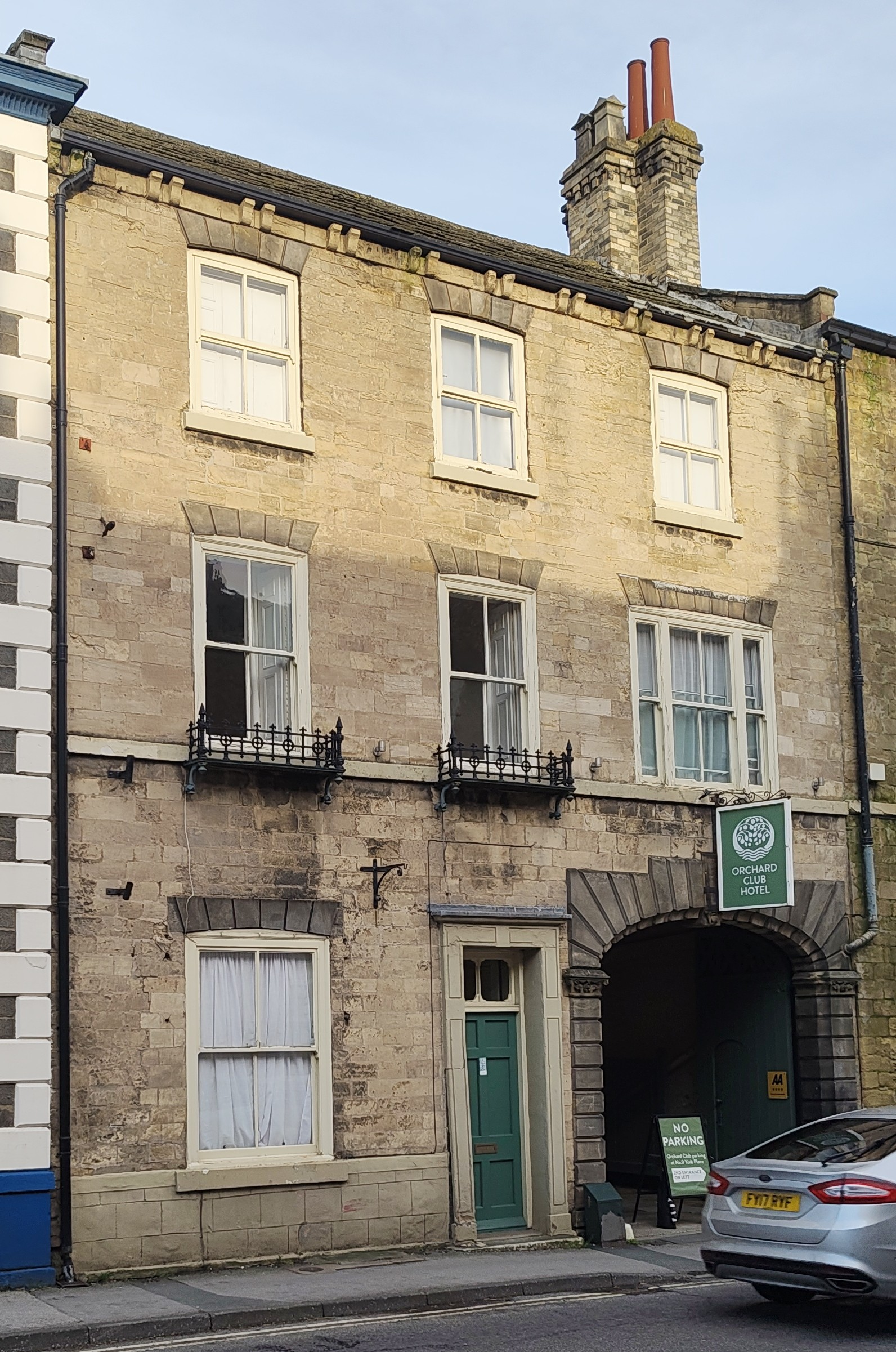
The left-hand house

The original house is built of limestone, with sill bands, a moulded eaves cornice, and a triangular pediment containing a blind oculus, flanked by blocking courses. It has three storeys and three bays. The central doorway has a shouldered architrave, a fanlight, consoles flanking a frieze of paterae and triglyphs, and carrying a cornice and segmental pediment. Above the doorway is a sash window in an architrave, and in the top floor is a lunette. The outer bays in the lower two floors contain bow windows, and in the top floor are sash windows in architraves.

The house to the left is also built of limestone with a sill band, and has paired gutter brackets and a stone slate roof. It has three storeys and three bays. In the right bay is a wide carriage arch with rusticated voussoirs and a keystone with a mask and a scroll motif. In the centre is a doorway in an architrave, and to its left is a sash window. Above are sash windows, those in the left two bays in the middle floor with cast iron balconies, and the window in the right bay tripartite. All the windows have segmental-arched channelled wedge lintels.

== See also ==
- Listed buildings in Knaresborough
