= Mother Shipton Inn =

Pub in Knaresborough, North Yorkshire, England

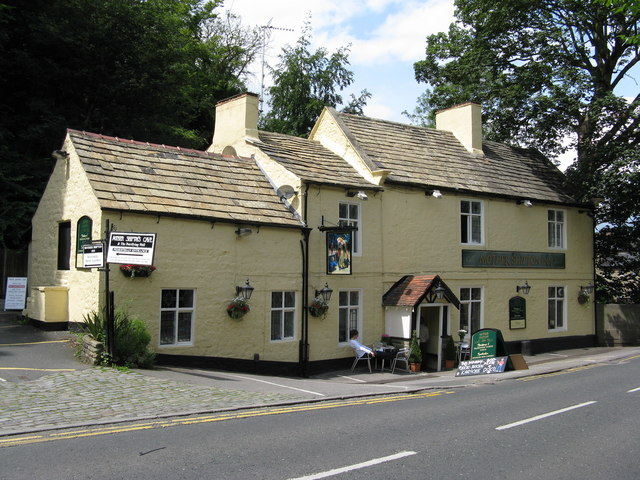
The pub, in 2009

The Mother Shipton Inn is a historic pub in Knaresborough, a town in North Yorkshire, in England.

The building was constructed in the 17th century, to serve as a gatehouse for the Long Walk promenade. It probably became an inn in the 18th century, and was long known as the "Dropping Well". The building was altered in the 19th century, and the door and windows were replaced in the 20th century. It was owned by the Slingsby family until 1915. The building was grade II listed in 1968. It was refurbished in 2017 at a cost of £200,000, at which time it was owned by Admiral Taverns.

The pub is built of stone, with a floor band, and a stone slate roof with gable coping and shaped kneelers. The main block has two storeys and two bays, with a two-storey single bay addition to the left, and a block of one storey with an attic and two bays at the far end. On the front is a porch, and the windows are casements. Inside the pub are a variety of rooms serving as bars and dining areas, one with a large stone fireplace. It is decorated with numerous pictures of Mother Shipton, and an 18th-century copper sign with her picture hangs outside.

== See also ==
- Listed buildings in Knaresborough
