= St John's House =

Historic building in Knaresborough, North Yorkshire

Coordinates: 54°00′40″N 1°28′18″W

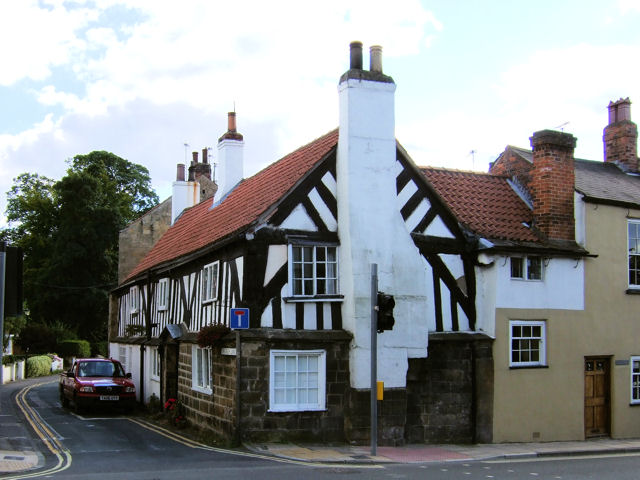
The building, in 2007

St John's House is a historic building in Knaresborough, a town in North Yorkshire, in England.

The open hall house was constructed using timbers dated between 1488 and 1490. It built for the Prebendary of Beechill. A written confession of sins, dated to the early 16th century, was later found hidden in a beam in the building. The house was sold by the church in 1776, and has since been a private residence. It was grade II listed in 1952.

The house is timber framed, with the ground floor and rear encased in gritstone, partly rendered, and it has a pantile roof. It has two storeys, three bays, and a rear aisle. The doorway has a gabled hood, and most of the windows date from the 20th century. In the upper floor is exposed close studded timber framing and curved braces. Inside, the original beams and joists survive and are visible. There is a large stone fireplace, and the stairs have 17th-century balusters.

== See also ==
- Listed buildings in Knaresborough
