= Knaresborough Market Cross =

Structure in Knaresborough, North Yorkshire, England

Coordinates: 54°00′28″N 1°28′01″W

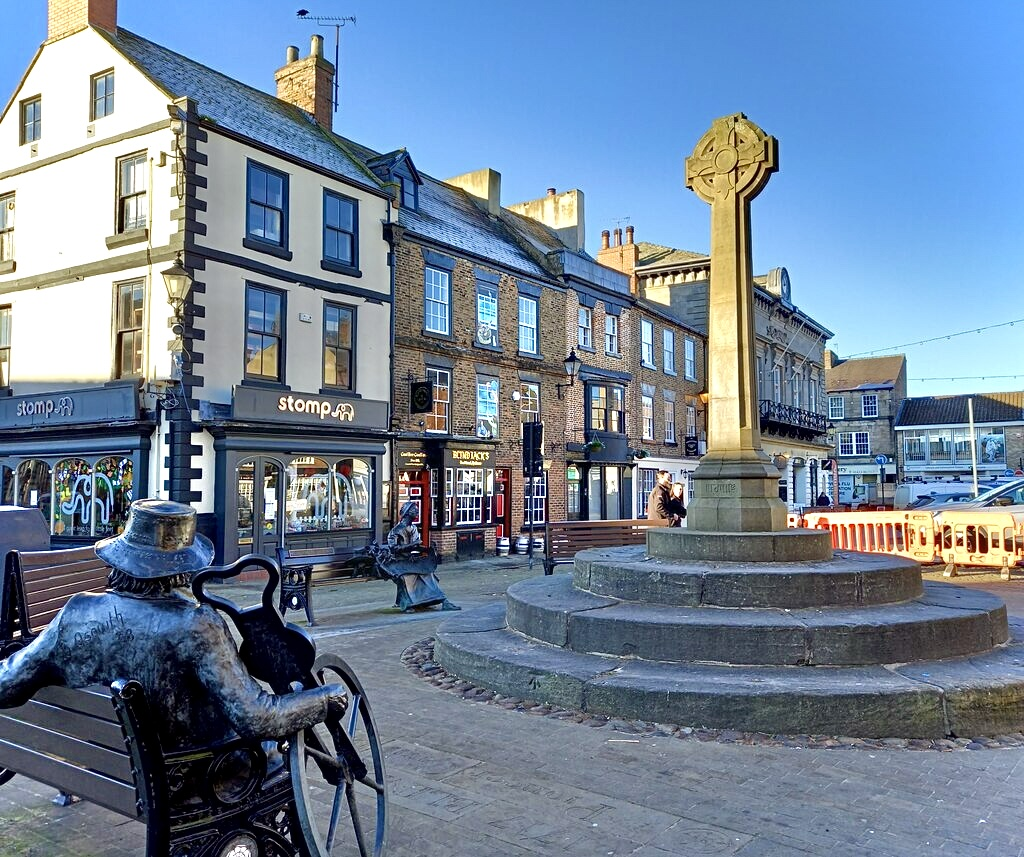
The cross, in 2023

Knaresborough Market Cross is a structure in Knaresborough, a town in North Yorkshire, in England.

Knaresborough's records claim that a market was first held in the town in 1206, although the town's market charter is from 1310. The market cross in the Market Place is believed to have been constructed in 1709. It was demolished in 1804, with only the steps which had supported it surviving. In 1953, Cecil Naden carved a replacement cross, to commemorate the Coronation of Elizabeth II, and it was placed atop the steps. The cross is alternatively known as the "Buttery" or "Butter Cross".

The steps are built of millstone grit. They have a circular plan, and consist of four concentric steps. They have been grade II listed since 1968.

== See also ==
- Listed buildings in Knaresborough
