= Listed buildings in Knaresborough =

Knaresborough is a civil parish in the county of North Yorkshire, England. It contains about 200 listed buildings that are recorded in the National Heritage List for England. Of these, two are listed at Grade I, the highest of the three grades, four are at Grade II*, the middle grade, and the others are at Grade II, the lowest grade. The parish contains the market town of Knaresborough and the surrounding area. Most of the listed buildings are houses, cottages and associated structures, shop, offices and commercial buildings. The River Nidd runs through the parish, and listed buildings associated with it are bridges and a weir. The railway came to the town in about 1851, and listed buildings associated with it are Knaresborough railway station, the portals of a tunnel, a water tank, a signal box, and the Knaresborough Viaduct, which carries the line over the River Nidd. There are two unusual buildings carved out of rock, St Robert's Cave and the Chapel of Our Lady of the Crag. Other listed buildings include churches and chapels, items in a churchyard, and a presbytery, a former court house and prison, public houses and hotels, a group of mill buildings, former schools, a former town hall, and a group of telephone kiosks.

== Key ==
Grade	Criteria
I	Buildings of exceptional interest, sometimes considered to be internationally important
II*	Particularly important buildings of more than special interest
II	Buildings of national importance and special interest

== Buildings ==
Name and location	Photograph	Date	Notes	Grade
St John the Baptist's Church; 54.00960°N 1.47184°W		c. 1200	The church has been altered and extended through the centuries, it dates mainly from the mid-15th century, and was restored in 1871–72 by Ewan Christian. The church is built in limestone with dressings in gritstone, and has roofs of Westmorland slate and lead. It consists of a nave, north and south aisles, a south porch, a central tower, and a chancel with a north vestry. The tower has four stages, diagonal buttresses, a clock face on the south, and paired trefoil-headed bell openings with hood moulds, above which is stone coping and corner pinnacles, and on the top is a slender lead-covered spire.	I
St Robert's Cave; 53.99932°N 1.45109°W		c. 1200 (possible)	A cave and the foundations of a chapel associated with Robert of Knaresborough. The foundations have a rectanglar plan, and contain a grave recess, a bench and steps. Two steps lead down to the cave, which has two chambers. The walls are covered in niches and inscriptions.	II*
Court House Museum; 54.00669°N 1.46914°W		14th century	The former court house in the grounds of Knaresborough Castle, later a museum, is in magnesian limestone and brick. The roof is in stone slate, with stone coping and a kneeler on the left, and hipped on the right. There are two storeys and five bays, and a single-storey two-bay extension at the rear. In the ground floor is a round-headed doorway with a hood mould, other doorways, and two horizontally-sliding sash windows. An external staircase leads up to a doorway in the upper floor with a chamfered surround and a basket arch. There are also five windows with chamfered surrounds, recessed mullions and stepped hood moulds.	II
Chapel of Our Lady of the Crag; 54.00286°N 1.46542°W		1407–08	The chapel is carved into the foot of a cliff. On the front is a round-arched doorway, and to its left is a mullioned and transomed window. To the right is a later carved figure of a knight in armour. Inside, there is a vault with a central boss, an altar, a canopied niche, and a piscina, all carved from the rock.	I
St John's House; 54.01113°N 1.47177°W		16th century	The house is timber framed, the ground floor and rear are encased in gritstone, partly rendered, and it has a pantile roof. There are two storeys, three bays, and a rear aisle. The doorway has a gabled hood, and most of the windows date from the 20th century. In the upper floor is exposed close studded timber framing and curved braces.	II
The Borough Bailiff; 54.00908°N 1.46798°W		16th century	The public house has been refronted and restored. It has a timber framed core, it is encased in rendered limestone, and has a hipped Westmorland slate roof. There are two storeys and four bays. The doorway has fluted pilasters with paterae, a fanlight, and a triangular pediment. On the front are three bow windows, and the other windows are sashes. Under the upper floor window in the second bay is a decorative wrought iron balcony.	II
Kirkness Cottage; 54.00556°N 1.46718°W		Late 16th century	The house has a timber framed core, the exterior is rendered, and it has a pantile roof. There are two storeys and two bays, and a lower two-storey single-bay extension to the right. In the centre is a doorway, with a passage door to the left. The windows date from the 20th century and are small paned.	II
12 Market Place; 54.00804°N 1.46675°W		1625	A shop with a timber framed core and a Westmorland slate roof. There are two storeys and attics, two gabled bays on the front, and four bays on the right return. In the ground floor is a shopfront with a cornice, and the upper floors contain sash windows.	II
Rose Cottage; 54.00621°N 1.46336°W		1685	The house is in red brick with stone dressings, chamfered quoins, a moulded floor band, and a hipped tile roof. There are two storeys, the northeast front has one bay, and there are two bays in the left return. In the centre of the front is a window in the architrave of a blocked doorway, over which is a broken segmental pediment containing the date. Above this is a sash window in an architrave, with a projecting apron.	II
85 and 87 High Street; 54.00950°N 1.46913°W		Late 16th to early 17th century	A house, later two shops, with a timber framed core, enclosed in stone, with a roof of Westmorland slate and eaves courses of stone slates. There is one storey and attics, and three bays. The left shop has a shopfront with a recessed doorway, and the right shop has a shopfront with a doorway on the left, and above it is a later three-light cross-window breaking through the eaves. Internally, there is a timber-framed wall with close studding.	II
44 and 46 Market Place; 54.00805°N 1.46778°W		Late 16th to early 17th century	A house, later two shops, on a corner site, probably with a timber framed core, the exterior rendered, and with a blocking course and a Westmorland slate roof. There are two storeys and three bays. On the front are two shopfronts, between them is a bow window, above which is a shallower bow window, and over the right shopfront is a sash window.	II
Manor Cottage; 54.00905°N 1.47173°W		Late 16th to early 17th century	The house has a timber framed core, with walls in rendered stone, with chequered paintwork, and a thatched roof. There is one storey and an attic, and three bays. It contains a small square window, and a larger two-light window. Inside, there are substantial remains of timber framing.	II
The Old Royal Oak; 54.00766°N 1.46664°W		16th to 17th century	The public house has a timber framed core, the exterior is rendered and it has a tile roof. There are two storeys and attics, and three bays, the right two bays wider and gabled, and the attic of the middle bay jettied. In the centre is a shopfront with a doorway. The windows date from after 1907, and all have tile roofs. Inside, there are extensive remains of timber framing.	II
1, 3 and 5 Kirkgate and 25 Castlegate; 54.00791°N 1.46782°W		Early 17th century	A row of three cottages, possibly almshouses, on a corner site, later used for other purposes. There is a timber framed core, the exterior is rendered, and the roof is partly in stone slate and partly in pantile. There are two storeys and attics, three bays on the front, and one on the right return. The left bay contains a bow window and a doorway to its left, and above are sash windows, the window in the attic horizontally-sliding. On the right bay is a doorway with a dentilled cornice. The right return contains a shopfront, and a large shop window above in an architrave with a cambered arch.	II
72, 74, 76 and 78 High Street; 54.00917°N 1.46820°W	—	Early 17th century	A row of four houses, later shops, with a timber framed core, encased in limestone, partly rendered, with a sill band, and Westmorland slate roofs, hipped on the right. There are two storeys and five bays. In the ground floor are shopfronts, doorways and bow windows, and the upper floor contains sash windows and a canted bay window.	II
10 Castlegate; 54.00738°N 1.46706°W		17th century (probable)	A house later used for other purposes, it is rendered and has a stone slate roof. There are two storeys and two bays. In the ground floor is a central doorway flanked by shop windows with cornices, and the upper floor contains casement windows.	II
2, 2A and 4 Cheapside and 38 Gracious Street; 54.00663°N 1.46641°W		17th century (probable)	A row of houses, later three shops, on a corner site. They have a timber framed core, encased in stone, and have a pantile roof with an eaves course of stone slate, coped on the right. There are two storeys and an L-shaped plan, with six bays on Cheapside and three on Gracious Street. In the left bay is a two-storey bow window, and elsewhere are doorways and shop windows. Most of the other windows are casements, and there is a horizontally-sliding sash window.	II
6, 8 and 10 Finkle Street; 54.00890°N 1.46899°W		17th century (probable)	A row of three rendered cottages, probably with a timber framed core, and with a Westmorland slate roof. There are two storeys and three bays. On the front are three doorways, in the right bay is a bow window, and the other windows are a mix of casements and horizontally-sliding sashes.	II
2 and 4 Market Place; 54.00792°N 1.46639°W		17th century	A house, later two shops, with a timber framed core, encased in painted brick, with a wooden cornice, moulded gutter brackets, and a tile roof. There are two storeys and two bays. In the centre are paired doorways with fanlights, a plate glass shop window to the right, and a shop window with Gothick tracery to the left. The upper floor contains two sash windows.	II
3 and 3A Market Place; 54.00770°N 1.46647°W		17th century	A pair of shops with a timber framed core, the exterior rendered and painted, and with a Westmorland slate roof. There are two storeys and two bays. The ground floor contains two shopfronts, and above are two three-light windows.	II
7 Market Place; 54.00769°N 1.46660°W		17th century	A shop with a timber framed core, rendered on the exterior, and with a tile roof. There are two storeys and an attic, and one gabled bay. In the ground floor is a shopfront, and the upper floor contains a five-light window with fluted pilasters and cornice. The gable is jettied on paired wooden brackets, and contains a small six-light window in a shouldered architrave.	II
14 Market Place; 54.00809°N 1.46684°W		17th century	A shop with a timber framed core, rendered on the exterior. There are two storeys and two bays. In the ground floor is a shopfront with a cornice, and the upper floor contains two sash windows in architraves. Above the windows is a parapet with a central opening, which rises to hide the two gables behind.	II
27 York Place; 54.00677°N 1.46287°W		17th century (probable)	The older part has a timber framed core, the walls are rendered and it has a moulded eaves cornice, and a tile roof with stone coping and a shaped kneeler on the right. There are two storeys, a front of three bays, two gabled, and one bay facing the street. On the street face are bow windows with panelled entablatures and dentilled cornices. The doorway on the main front has panelled reveals, a fanlight, a reeded entablature with paterae, and a cornice. The windows are casements.	II
Mother Shipton Inn; 54.00293°N 1.46784°W		17th century	The public house is in stone, with a floor band, and a stone slate roof with gable coping and shaped kneelers. The main block has two storeys and two bays, with a two-storey single bay addition to the left, and a block of one storey with an attic and two bays at the far end. On the front is a porch, and the windows are casements.	II
The Oldest Chemist Shop in England; 54.00815°N 1.46692°W		17th century	The shop has a timber framed core, it is encased in brick on the front, and has a pantile roof. There are two storeys and attics, and two gabled bays. In the ground floor are central double doors flanked by bow windows with decorative wooden posts. The upper floor contains tripartite sash windows, in the left bay of the attic is a four-light sash window, and the other bay contains a painted replica. Inside the shop is surviving timber framing and 18th-century shop fittings.	II
Ye Olde Cottage; 54.00842°N 1.46940°W		17th century (probable)	The cottage is rendered and has a pantile roof. There is one storey and three bays. Steps lead up to the doorway with a small cornice to the left. To its left is a large three-light window, and to its right is a smaller two-light window. On the far right are two square recesses.	II
Manor House; 54.00886°N 1.47181°W		Mid to late 17th century (probable)	The house has a timber framed core, the walls are in rendered stone, with chequered paintwork, and the roof is in stone slate with some Westmorland slate. There are two storeys, and an L-shaped plan, and a two-storey porch projecting on the south side of the east wing. The windows date from the 19th century.	II
104 and 106 High Street; 54.01055°N 1.46963°W		Late 17th century	A pair of houses, later used for other purposes, in red brick on a stone plinth, with quoins, a floor band, a deep eaves cornice on moulded wooden brackets, and a pantile roof with an eaves course of stone slates. There are two storeys and six bays. In the centre are two doorways, the left with a fanlight, and the right with a canopy on wrought iron brackets, and the windows are sashes in architraves.	II
98, 100 and 102 High Street; 54.00987°N 1.46957°W		Late 17th to early 18th century (possible)	A row of three houses in red brick on a limestone plinth, with quoins, floor bands, and a Westmorland slate roof. There are two storeys and five bays. Steps lead up to the three doorways with divided fanlights, and the windows are sashes.	II
128, 130 and 132 High Street; 54.01110°N 1.47015°W		17th to 18th century	A row of three cottages in limestone, the left cottage rendered, on a plinth, with a floor band, and a pantile roof with eaves courses of stone slates. There is one storey and attics, five bays, and two rear wings. On the front are three doorways, and the windows are horizontally-sliding sashes.	II
Gate piers, Scriven Park; 54.01515°N 1.47525°W		Late 17th to early 18th century	The two pairs of gate piers at the entrance to the drive to Scriven Hall, which has been demolished, are in rusticated stone. The inner pair are about 4 metres (13 ft) high, and each pier has a moulded plinth and a deep cornice, on which are four S-shaped supports on balls, carrying a swagged orb and a coronet. The outer gate piers are smaller, about 3.5 metres (11 ft) high, and are surmounted by ball finials.	II*
The Moat Cafe and wall 54.00713°N 1.46754°W		17th to 18th century	An outbuilding later converted into a café, it is rendered, and has a Westmorland slate roof. There are two storeys and an attic, a gabled one-bay front facing the street and two bays on the left return. In the ground floor is a café front, and above and in the return are horizontally-sliding sash windows. To the right is a limestone wall about 2 metres (6 ft 7 in) high and 6 metres (20 ft) long.	II
9 Bond End; 54.01123°N 1.47106°W		Early 18th century (probable)	A house, later used for other purposes, it is rendered, and has a pantile roof and an eaves course of stone slates. There is one storey and two bays. In the centre is a doorway, and this is flanked by sash windows.	II
1 and 1A Castlegate; 54.00710°N 1.46739°W		Early 18th century	A house, later two shops with accommodation above, in painted brick, with a Westmorland slate roof. There are two storeys and three bays. In the centre is a doorway in an architrave, with a cornice on brackets. To its left is a bow window and a shopfront, and there is another shopfront in the right bay. The upper floor contains sash windows and a blind window.	II
11A, 13 and 15 Castlegate; 54.00746°N 1.46726°W		Early 18th century (probable)	A row of three rendered shops on a corner site, with a floor band, a projecting eaves band, and a Westmorland slate roof. There are two storeys and attics, and three bays. The ground floor contains shopfronts, and in the right return are shop windows. In the upper floor are a mix of sash and casement windows.	II
The Abbey; 53.99666°N 1.45889°W	—	Early 18th century	The house, which has been extended, is in brick and stone with stone dressings, quoins, and a pantile roof with stone coped gables and kneelers. There are two storeys and attics, and a northwest front of five bays. The central doorway has a fanlight. Most of the windows are sashes, in the main fronts are two-storey canted bay windows, and in the attics are dormers, some raking and others with hipped roofs.	II
The Old Carpet Mart; 54.00732°N 1.46621°W	cntre	Early 18th century	The warehouse is in stone and red brick with stone dressings, and a roof of pantile with the lower courses in stone slate. In the gable end is a shop entrance and a doorway to the right, and above are casement windows. Elsewhere, the windows are horizontally-sliding sashes, those in the right return with flat heads and segmental brick arches.	II
7 Castlegate; 54.00731°N 1.46730°W		Early to mid 18th century	Two houses, later a shop with living accommodation above, in brown brick with rendered in the ground floor and a pantile roof. There are three storeys and two bays. In the ground floor are shopfronts with fascia boards and a cornice on brackets. The upper floors contain sash windows, those in the middle floor with relieving arches.	II
40 High Street; 54.00842°N 1.46643°W		Early to mid 18th century	A shop with accommodation above, it is rendered, and has a moulded eaves cornice, and a Westmorland slate roof with stone coping and moulded kneelers. There are three storeys and two bays. In the ground floor is a shopfront, with a segmental pediment over the doorway and a triangular pediment to the right, and the upper floors contain sash windows.	II
25 Kirkgate; 54.00834°N 1.46911°W		Early to mid 18th century	A house, later used for other purposes, in rendered brick on a rendered plinth, with limestone details, chamfered quoins, floor bands, and a tile roof. There are three storeys and five bays. The central doorway has attached Tuscan columns, a radial fanlight, and an open triangular pediment. The windows are sashes with keystones.	II
21 Market Place; 54.00790°N 1.46717°W		Early to mid 18th century	A house, at one time a shop, in red brick, with floor and eaves bands, a moulded eaves cornice, a parapet, and a Westmorland slate roof with traces of stone coping on the right. There are three storeys and one bay. In the ground floor is a doorway with a fanlight, and to its right is a three-light shop window with a bracketed cornice. Above this is a large bow window, and in the top floor are sash windows with wedge lintels and double keystones.	II
11 and 13 Bond End; 54.01120°N 1.47127°W		18th century	A pair of cottages in rendered brick, that have a pantile roof with an eaves course of stone slates, and tumbled brickwork and stone coping on the left gable. There are two storeys and three bays. On the front are two doorway in architraves. To the left is a canted bay window and to its right is a shop window. Further to the right, and in the upper floor, are horizontally-sliding sash windows.	II
14 Bond End; 54.01143°N 1.47135°W		18th century	The house is in gritstone, with a wooden eaves band, gutter brackets, and a Westmorland slate roof. There are two storeys and one bay. The doorway has panelled reveals, pilasters, a fanlight, consoles and a cornice. In each floor is a sash window in a wooden architrave.	II
15 Bond End; 54.01120°N 1.47143°W		18th century	The house is in painted brick, and has a pantile roof with two eaves courses of stone slates. There are three storeys and two bays. The windows are a mix of fixed lights and horizontally-sliding sashes.	II
17 Bond End; 54.01120°N 1.47152°W		18th century	The house is in rendered brick, and has a Westmorland slate roof with eaves courses of stone slates. There are three storeys and two bays. In the centre is a doorway, with a double doorway to its right. The windows are horizontally-sliding sashes.	II
21 Bond End; 54.01113°N 1.47197°W		18th century	The house is rendered and has a pantile roof. There are two storeys and three bays. On the front is a recessed doorway with a three-pane fanlight, and the windows are sashes.	II
22 Bond End; 54.01148°N 1.47148°W		18th century	Four cottages combined into one house, in gritstone with a Westmorland slate roof. There are two storeys and four bays. In the ground floor, to the left is a doorway with a fanlight, and to the right is a bow window, and the other windows are sashes.	II
57A Bond End; 54.01008°N 1.47402°W	—	18th century	A house in limestone at the end of a row, with a stone slate roof. There are two storeys and two bays. On the left is a doorway, and the windows are sashes, two on the ground floor and one in the upper floor.	II
1 and 2 Castle Ings Gardens; 54.00590°N 1.46880°W	—	18th century	A row of three cottages combined into one house, in limestone, with a Westmorland slate roof on the left and a stone slate roof on the right. There are two storeys and three bays. To the left of the central doorway is a large bow window, and the other windows are sashes in architraves.	II
20, 22 and 24 Cheapside; 54.00686°N 1.46699°W		Mid 18th century	A row of three houses on limestone, with a Westmorland slate roof and an eaves course of stone slates. There are two storeys and attics, and three bays. In the ground floor are three doorways, the windows are sashes in architraves, and in the attic is a dormer with horizontally-sliding sashes.	II
20 Finkle Street and carriage arch 54.00866°N 1.46929°W		Mid 18th century	The house is in red brick on a limestone plinth, with limestone dressings, quoins, and a Westmorland slate roof. There are three storeys and two bays. In the left bay, steps lead up to a doorway with panelled reveals, a fanlight, Doric pilasters, an entablature and a cornice. In the right bay, the lower two floors contain bow windows, and the other windows are sashes in architraves with segmental heads. To the right is a carriage arch with a sash window above.	II
20 High Street; 54.00793°N 1.46530°W		Mid 18th century	A house, later a shop, in limestone, with sill bands, wooden gutter brackets, and a Westmorland slate roof. There are three storeys and one bay. In the ground floor, on the right, steps lead up to a doorway in an architrave, and to the left is a bow window in an architrave, with a cornice. Above it is a bow window, and in the top floor is a sash window in an architrave.	II
45 High Street; 54.00871°N 1.46761°W		18th century	A house with accommodation above, later used for other purposes, in brown brick, with a modillion eaves cornice and a hipped Westmorland slate roof. There are three storeys and one bay. In the ground floor is a doorway with a fanlight, and to the right is a canted bay window with a scroll motif. Above is a sign board with a modillion cornice on decorated console brackets. and In each upper floor is a bow window.	II
54 High Street; 54.00881°N 1.46730°W	—	Mid 18th century	A house, later a shop with accommodation above, in red brick, with dentilled eaves, gutter brackets and a Westmorland slate roof. There are three storeys and three bays. In the right bay is a carriage entrance and to its left is a shopfront. The upper floors contain sash windows in architraves, with projecting keystones.	II
60 High Street; 54.00890°N 1.46756°W	—	Mid 18th century	A house, later two shops, rendered, with a floor and an eaves band, and a tile roof with shaped kneelers and stone coping on the left. There are three storeys and two bays. In the centre is a doorway flanked by shopfronts, and the middle floor contains two wide bow windows. In the top floor are three sash windows with wedge lintels and projecting keystones.	II
15 Kirkgate; 54.00812°N 1.46836°W		Mid 18th century	A warehouse, later a factory, in red brick, with a hipped stone slate roof, three storeys and six bays. On the front are two doorways, and the windows are sashes, those in the lower two floors horizontally-sliding. Some windows are blocked, and all the openings have segmental-arched heads. At the rear is a two-storey three-bay extension, its openings with lintels and keystones. The right return is in limestone, and contains a loading door.	II
49 and 51 Kirkgate and rear garden wall 54.00874°N 1.47067°W		18th century	A pair of houses in rendered stone, with a Westmorland slate roof, hipped on the left, and with gable coping on the right. There are three storeys on the front, with irregular sash window, some horizontally-sliding, and two doorways. The rear is in limestone with quoins, and has four storeys, the right bay projecting as a wing, and three tiers of canted bay windows on the right. The rear garden wall is in brick on a limestone plinth with an embattled parapet, and contains an archway and a corner tower.	II
6 Market Place; 54.00792°N 1.46652°W		Mid 18th century	A house, later a shop, with living accommodation above, it is rendered, and has quoins, floor and eaves bands, a brick parapet with a stone cornice, and a stone slate roof. There are three storeys and three bays. In the ground floor is a shopfront and a doorway with traceried fanlight to the right, and the upper floors contain sash windows in architraves with keystones and moulded sills.	II
13 Market Place; 54.00766°N 1.46718°W		Mid 18th century	A row of three houses, all with three storeys and Westmorland slate roofs. The left house has one bay, it is rendered, and has quoins on the left. In the ground floor is a shopfront, the middle floor contains a sash window, and in the top floor is a Venetian window. The middle house projects slightly, it has two bays, and is taller. In the ground floor is a canted bay window with a doorway to its right, and the upper floors contain sash windows with sill bands. The right house projects slightly more, it is less tall, and has two bays. In the ground flor is a shopfront, and the upper floors contain sash windows with sill bands.	II
17 Market Place; 54.00782°N 1.46704°W		Mid 18th century	A house, later a shop, on a corner site, it is rendered, on a limestone plinth, and has quoins, a floor band, and a Westmorland slate roof with stone copings and shaped kneelers. There are three storeys and an attic, and two bays on the front. In the ground floor, on the front and in the return, are arcaded doorways and shop windows, and the upper floors and attic contain sash windows.	II
19 Market Place; 54.00786°N 1.46710°W		Mid 18th century	Two houses, later a public house. in red brick with a stepped floor band, a moulded eaves course, and a Westmorland slate roof. There are three storeys and an attic, and three bays. On the front is a bay window flanked by doorways with Gothick-traceried fanlight, and to the right is a sash window in an architrave. In the upper floors, the middle bay contains painted blind windows, and in the outer bays are sash windows, all with wedge lintels, and in the attic is a small gabled dormer.	II
32 and 34 Market Place; 54.00838°N 1.46737°W		Mid 18th century	A house, later two shops, in rendered brick, with floor bands, a moulded eaves cornice, a brick parapet with stone pilasters at the ends, and ramped stone coping, and a Westmorland stone roof with stone gable copings. There are three storeys and four bays. In the ground floor are shopfronts with wooden pilasters, and to the left is a passage entry. The upper floors contain sash windows in architraves, with moulded sills, and lintels with keystones.	II
Ashwell Lodge; 54.01023°N 1.47380°W	—	Mid 18th century	A house in limestone, roughcast on the front, with wooden gutter brackets and a hipped Westmorland slate roof. There are two storeys and three bays. The central doorway has pilasters, a fanlight, and an open triangular pediment. The windows are sashes in architraves.	II
Beech House; 54.00919°N 1.46745°W		18th century	The house, later used for other purposes, is rendered, and has a moulded floor band, and a parapet with brick fluted panels, and a modillion cornice. There are two storeys, a cellar and a false attic storey, and five bays. In the centre is a porch with Tuscan columns, an entablature with a cornice and a blocking course, and a doorway in an architrave. In the right bay is a doorway with an architrave and a pediment. Also on the front are two canted bay windows, the left with two storeys. The other windows are sashes with wedge lintels. The left return has two storeys and seven bays.	II
Castle Cliffe; 54.00810°N 1.46898°W	—	Mid 18th century	The house is in limestone with stone gutter brackets and a stone slate roof. There are two storeys and attics, and three bays. The central doorway has a fanlight and a cornice. The doorway and the flanking sash windows have Gibbs surrounds and triple keystones. In the upper floor are sash windows with incised eared lintels and keystones, and there is a central dormer.	II
Castle Close; 54.00803°N 1.46901°W	—	Mid 18th century	A house or folly, in stone, with a pyramidal stone slate roof. There are two storeys with a moulded and dentilled eaves cornice, and a two-storey two-bay addition to the east, with gable coping and a ball finial.	II
Castle Vaults; 54.00784°N 1.46782°W		Mid 18th century	The public house (later The Castle Inn), is rendered, and has massive quoins, sill bands, a dentilled eaves cornice, and a hipped slate roof. There are four storeys, one bay on the north front and two on the east front. The ground floor of the north front has three Doric pilasters flanking sash windows. Above it is a triglyph frieze, and a canted bay window in each of the three upper floors. On the east front is a doorway with a divided fanlight on the left, and the right bay curves round the corner. The upper floors contain sash and blind windows.	II
Former dye house and boatshed 54.00818°N 1.47011°W		Mid 18th century	The building, later converted for residential use, is in rendered limestone with a pantile roof. There are two storeys and four bays. In the centre is a cambered archway, and in the outer bays are doorways. Above the right doorway is the former segmental-ached loading door, to the left are sash windows, and in the roof are two gabled dormers.	II
Steps to the market cross 54.00789°N 1.46682°W		18th century	The steps are in millstone grit. They have a circular plan, and consist of four concentric steps. The cross dates from the 20th century.	II
Kirkman Bank; 54.00789°N 1.47303°W	—	18th century	A farmhouse, extended later in the century, to become a small Georgian country house. It is in yellow limestone with Welsh slate roofs. The original farmhouse has two storeys and four bays and two storeys. The later house to the southwest has two storeys, a double depth plan, and four bays. The windows in both parts are sashes.	II
Oakfield House; 54.00389°N 1.46760°W		18th century	The house is in brown brick on a limestone plinth, with limestone dressings, quoins, floor bands, a stone eaves band, and a Westmorland slate roof. There are three storeys and three bays. Steps lead up to the doorway in the left bay that has a rectangular traceried fanlight, and the windows are sashes, those in the lower two floors with keystones.	II
Former Royal Oak Public House; 54.01142°N 1.47057°W		Mid 18th century	The public house, later used for other purposes, is rendered, and has wooden eaves with gutter brackets, and a Westmorland slate roof with gable coping on the right. There are two storeys and four bays, the left bay canted and containing a segmental carriage arch. The doorway has a wooden surround, and a cornice on consoles. The windows are sashes in wooden architraves.	II
Swadford House; 54.00699°N 1.46513°W		18th century	Two houses combined into one, in brick, the ground floor rendered, on a stone plinth, with quoins and a sill band. There are two storeys and five bays, the left three bays lower. The left part has a roof of stone slate, and to the right it is in Westmorland slate. The right part contains a doorway a fanlight, and an architrave with a cornice and two stone balls. Above the doorway is a blind window, and the other windows are sashes with slightly cambered heads, the window in the ground floor with a keystone. The left part contains sash windows in architraves, the window in the ground floor with a double keystone.	II
The Dower House; 54.01124°N 1.47260°W		Mid 18th century	The dower house, later a hotel, is in red brick on a limestone plinth, with stone dressings, rusticated quoins, a parapet with moulded limestone coping, and a pantile roof with eaves courses of stone slate. There are three storeys, the top storey false, with sloping ends, and seven bays. The central doorway is round-arched, with a fanlight and a keystone. The windows in the lower two floors are sashes with architraves, flat arches and keystones, and in the top floor are five blind windows.	II
The Old School House; 54.01005°N 1.46941°W		Mid 18th century	The school house, later a private house, is rendered, and has a pantile roof with eaves courses of stone slates, and stone gable coping. There are two storeys and three bays. The central doorway has panelled reveals and a fanlight, and above it is an inscribed tablet. To the right of the doorway is a sash window in an architrave, and the other windows are horizontally-sliding sashes.	II
Windsor House; 54.00658°N 1.46385°W		Mid 18th century (probable)	The house is rendered, and has wooden gutter brackets, and a Westmorland slate roof, with the remains of stone coping and a kneeler on the left. There are two storeys and six bays. The doorway has an architrave, a rectangular fanlight and a cornice. The windows are sashes in architraves, and some windows are blind.	II
80 High Street; 54.00926°N 1.46838°W		1764 (probable)	A shop with storage above, it is rendered, and has a pantile roof. There are three storeys and three bays. In the left bay is a segmental carriage archway, and to its right is a shopfront. In the upper floor, the left bay contains casement windows, and in the other bays are sash windows in architraves under segmental arches.	II
19 Bond End; 54.01119°N 1.47160°W		Mid to late 18th century	A house on a corner site, later a shop, it is rendered, with quoins on the right, and a Westmorland slate roof. There are three storeys and two bays. In the ground floor is a shop door flanked by bow windows, and the upper floors contains sash windows in wooden architraves.	II
Railings, gates and overthrow with lamp, 14 and 16 Boroughbridge Road; 54.01249°N 1.46879°W		Mid to late 18th century	The railings, gates and overthrow are in wrought iron. The railings are on a gritstone base and have pointed and vase finials, and the overthrow has a lamp. The gate posts are in the form of Classical columns with vase finials.	II
110 Briggate; 54.00396°N 1.46763°W		Mid to late 18th century	A house in brown brick on a limestone plinth, with quoins, floor and eaves bands, and a stone slate roof. There are three storeys and three bays. In the left bay is a doorway with a wedge lintel. The windows are sashes, those in the lower two floors with wedge lintels and keystones.	II
6 and 8 Cheapside; 54.00669°N 1.46663°W		Mid to late 18th century	A pair of rendered houses with a Westmorland slate roof, three storeys and two bays. In the centre is a passage door flanked by two house doorways. There is one casement window, the other windows are sashes, those in the top floor horizontally-sliding.	II
14 Cheapside; 54.00674°N 1.46679°W		Mid to late 18th century	A house in limestone with a Westmorland slate roof, two storeys and two bays. In the left bay are two doorways, the left with a fanlight. The windows are sashes, the window in the ground floor with a plain lintel, and those above with incised lintels.	II
16 and 18 Cheapside; 54.00679°N 1.46688°W		Mid to late 18th century	A pair of houses in limestone, with a stone slate roof, two storeys and cellars, and four bays. In the centre are paired doorways with steps, outside which are bow windows over cellar openings. In the upper floor, the middle bays contain blind windows, in the outer bays are sash windows in architraves, and on the roof on the left is a dormer.	II
7 Church Lane; 54.01096°N 1.47159°W	—	Mid to late 18th century	A rendered house with a pantile roof and four courses of eaves stone slates. There are two storeys and three bays. The doorway has an architrave, a fanlight, a cornice and a flat hood. To its right is a bow window, and the other windows are sashes, those in the ground floor with architraves.	II
4 and 6 High Bond End; 54.01359°N 1.47278°W	—	Mid to late 18th century	A pair of limestone houses with a stone slate roof. There are three storeys and three bays. In the centre are paired doorways with divided fanlights, and above them are blind windows. The outer bays contain sash windows with architraves and flat arches.	II
23 and 25 High Street; 54.00800°N 1.46606°W		Mid to late 18th century	Two shops with accommodation above, they are rendered, and have a pantile roof. There are three storeys and three bays. In the centre is a wide carriage arch, and this is flanked by shopfronts. The upper floors contain sash windows.	II
47 High Street; 54.00876°N 1.46774°W		Mid to late 18th century	A house on a corner site, later a shop, it is rendered, and has a dentilled and moulded eaves cornice, and a Westmorland slate roof. There are three storeys and three bays. In the ground floor is a doorway flanked by plate glass windows, and above them is a sloping fascia, and a deep cornice. The upper floors contain sash windows, those in the top floor with double keystones.	II
57 and 59 High Street; 54.00893°N 1.46813°W		Mid to late 18th century	A house, later two shops, in limestone with a Westmorland slate roof. There are three storeys and an attic, and three bays. In the ground floor are two shopfronts, and a passage entry on the left. Above is a fascia board with dentilled decoration flanked by carved consoles. In the middle floor are canted bay windows with dentilled cornices, and the top floor contains a small inserted square window, and to the right are two sash windows flanking a blind window. In the left bay of the attic is a gabled dormer, and to the right are two small segmental-headed windows.	II
86 High Street; 54.00940°N 1.46863°W		Mid to late 18th century	A shop with accommodation above, it is in painted brick and has a stone slate roof with courses of pantiles at the ridge. There are two storeys and two bays. In the ground floor ii a shopfront containing a doorway with a fanlight, above which is a plain fascia, and a deep cornice on moulded consoles. The upper floor contains a bow window on the left, and a sash window to the right.	II
2 and 4 Kirkgate; 54.00807°N 1.46790°W		Mid to late 18th century	A pair of houses, in the past used for other purposes, in red brick, with a dentilled eaves cornice and a Westmorland slate roof. There are three storeys and three bays. On the front are two doorways with fanlights, the right with pilasters and a cornice. In the middle floor of the left bay is a bay window, and the other windows are sashes.	II
57, 59 and 61 Kirkgate; 54.00888°N 1.47111°W		Mid to late 18th century	Two, later three, houses in limestone, with a stone slate roof, three storeys and four bays. On the front are two doorways with architraves consoles and cornices, and to the left is a passage door. In the second and fourth bays are sash windows in architraves, the other bays contain blind windows, and all have wedge lintels.	II
1 Market Place; 54.00778°N 1.46630°W		Mid to late 18th century	Two houses, later a shop, in painted brick, with quoins, floor bands, a dentilled eaves cornice, and a stone slate roof. On the front is a doorway flanked by bow windows, and to the left is a doorway in an architrave, with a traceried fanlight. The upper floors contain sash windows with keystones.	II
23 Market Place; 54.00793°N 1.46723°W		Mid to late 18th century	A house, later used for other purposes, in red brick, the ground floor rendered, with a Westmorland slate roof. There are three storeys and three bays. The central doorway has a fanlight, and is flanked by plate glass windows. The upper floors contain sash windows with wedge lintels.	II
26 York Street and 2 Iles Lane; 54.00679°N 1.46350°W		Mid to late 18th century	A house on a corner site, later used for other purposes, in limestone, with paired gutter brackets and a hipped Westmorland slate roof. There are three storeys, three bays on the front and two on the right return. In the centre of the front, steps lead up to a doorway with an architrave, a fanlight, an entablature and a cornice. The windows are sashes, those in the ground floor with shouldered wedge lintels and keystones, and those in the upper floors with incised lintels. In the right return is a doorway and sash windows, all with wedge lintels.	II
Ashwell House; 54.01014°N 1.47394°W	—	Mid to late 18th century	A house in limestone, with a stone slate roof, two storeys and three bays. The doorway is in the centre, and above it is a blind window. In the outer bays are sash windows in architraves, one horizontally-sliding.	II
Bond End House and Grove House; 54.01247°N 1.46870°W		Mid to late 18th century	A large house, later divided, it is rendered, and has a floor band, a dentilled eaves cornice, and a Westmorland slate roof with stone coping, There are three storeys and five bays, and a two-storey, one-bay block on the left. The doorway has an architrave a fanlight and a cornice, and is flanked by bay windows. The other windows are sashes in architraves, those in the ground floor with cornices. There is also a bay window in the left block.	II
Castle Mill: Central range 54.00630°N 1.47100°W	—	Mid to late 18th century	The mill building, later used for other purposes, is in rendered stone and brick, and has a stone slate roof with courses of Westmorland slate, a stone ridge, and stone gable coping and a kneeler on the right. There are two storeys and four bays. The windows are sashes, some horizontally-sliding, and some in architraves.	II
Castle Mill: Central building 54.00634°N 1.47084°W	—	Mid to late 18th century	The mill building, later used for other purposes, is in brick on a stone plinth, with sandstone details, quoins and a stone slate roof. There are three storeys and five bays. The windows are sashes, and some are blocked.	II
Newton House; 54.00723°N 1.46404°W		Mid to late 18th century	A house, later a hotel, in limestone, with sill bands, a moulded eaves cornice, and a triangular pediment containing a blind oculus, flanked by blocking courses. There are three storeys and three bays. The central doorway has a shouldered architrave, a fanlight, consoles flanking a frieze of paterae and triglyphs, and carrying a cornice and segmental pediment. Above the doorway is a sash window in an architrave, and in the top floor is a lunette. The outer bays in the lower two floors contain bow windows, and in the top floor are sash windows in architraves.	II
Richmond House; 54.00809°N 1.47009°W		Mid to late 18th century	The house is in red brick on a limestone plinth, with a modillion eaves cornice and a stone slate roof. There are two storeys and three bays. Steps with a handrail lead up to the central doorway that has an architrave and a fanlight. The windows are sashes in architraves, and all the openings have brick lintels and projecting keystones.	II
York House and railings 54.00716°N 1.46380°W		Mid to late 18th century	The house is in rendered limestone, with a sill band, and a moulded and dentilled eaves cornice. There are three storeys and five bays. Steps lead up to the central doorway that has Tuscan columns, a fanlight, a fluted entablature, and a dentilled triangular pediment. The windows are sashes with keystones. In front of the house are iron railings.	II
Knaresborough House; 54.01029°N 1.47011°W		c. 1768	A large house, later used for other purposes, in limestone, with a balustraded band over the ground floor, a moulded eaves cornice, and a hipped stone slate roof. The main block has three storeys and five bays, with a single-storey two-bay wing on the left and a two-storey two-bay wing on the right. In the centre is a portico with Tuscan columns carrying a fluted frieze, a dentilled cornice, and a triangular pediment, and a doorway with a fanlight. The windows are sashes.	II
Fort Montague and wall 54.00323°N 1.46573°W		1770–91	A house, partly cut into a cliff face, and partly in stone, partly rendered, with a Westmorland slate roof. There are four storeys and one bay, with one room on each floor. On the east front is a segmental-arched doorway in the top floor, and on the south front is a sash window on each floor, all but the top window horizontally-sliding. At the top is an embattled parapet, and to the left is a wall, also with an embattled parapet.	II
High Bridge; 54.00904°N 1.47501°W		1773	The bridge, which has since been widened, carries Harrogate Road (A59 road) over the River Nidd. It is in gritstone and consists of two segmental arches with voussoirs. The bridge has pointed cutwaters on both sides and chamfered ribs, and a footpath has been built on the downstream side.	II
2, 4, 6, 8 and 10 Bond End; 54.01139°N 1.47085°W	—	Late 18th century	A linen mill, converted into five houses in about 1820, it is in gritstone with a pantile roof. There are two storeys and five bays, the left bay recessed. Three of the doorways have panelled reveals, fanlights, and cornices on consoles. In the middle floor of the second bay is a canted bay window with a wrought iron balustrade, and the other windows are sashes.	II
3 and 5 Bond End; 54.01124°N 1.47085°W		Late 18th century	A pair of houses in millstone grit with a stone slate roof. There are three storeys and two bays. In the outer parts are doorways with fanlights. The right window in the ground floor is a top-hung casement, and the others are sashes. The windows in the lower two floors have splayed lintels, voussoirs and keystones.	II
39 and 41 Bond End; 54.01007°N 1.47363°W	—	Late 18th century	A pair of houses in limestone with a Westmorland slate roof. There are two storeys and two bays. The doorways have fanlights, and the left house has a later large porch in Classical style. The windows are sashes.	II
2 and 4 Finkle Street; 54.00898°N 1.46886°W		Late 18th century	A pair of houses in limestone with a pantile roof. There are two storeys and three bays. In the left bay is a carriage entrance with a casement window above. The other bays contain a doorway with a fanlight in the outer part, between which are bow windows. In the upper floor are sash windows.	II
14, 16 and 18 Finkle Street; 54.00873°N 1.46°W	—	Late 18th century	A row of three houses in limestone, with moulded stone gutter brackets, and a slate roof. There are two storeys and three bays. In the ground floor are three doorways in moulded frames, two bow windows, and to the left is a sash window in an architrave. The upper floor contains four horizontally sliding sash windows with keystones and voussoirs.	II
3 Gracious Street; 54.00707°N 1.46500°W		Late 18th century	The house is in brick on a plinth, the left return rendered, with quoins, cogged eaves and a tile roof. There are three storeys and one bay. In the ground floor is a doorway in an architrave, with a fanlight and a cornice, and to its right is a canted bay window. The upper floors contain top-hung windows in architraves, the window in the middle floor with a wedge lintel.	II
14 High Street; 54.00783°N 1.46504°W		Late 18th century	A shop with offices above in red brick, with dentilled eaves and a pantile roof. There are three storeys and two bays. In the ground floor is a shopfront with a central doorway flanked by bow windows in architraves, a fascia and a cornice on carved brackets. The upper floors contain sash windows with incised wedge lintels.	II
16 and 18 High Street and railings 54.00796°N 1.46540°W		Late 18th century	A pair of houses later used for other purposes, in red brick, on a limestone plinth, with quoins on the left, and a Westmorland slate roof. There are three storeys and three bays. The central doorway has reeded pilasters, a traceried fanlight, and a moulded cornice on consoles. To the right is a shop front, and to the left is a bow window, with another bow window above it. The other windows are sashes with wedge linels, the middle window in the top floor blind. In front of the forecout are cast iron railings with fleur de lis finials.	II
22 High Street; 54.00795°N 1.46539°W		Late 18th century	A house, later two shops, in limestone, with dentilled eaves and a stone slate roof. There are three storeys and two bays. In the ground floor is a doorway flanked by shop windows with slender columns and arches, above which is a fascia board and a moulded cornice. To the right is a doorway with a cornice on moulded brackets. The upper floors contain blind windows in the middle bays, bow windows in the middle floor, and casements in the top floor.	II
35 High Street; 54.00845°N 1.46697°W		Late 18th century	A shop with accommodation above on a corner site, later extended to the south. It is rendered, with a hipped Westmorland slate roof, and three storeys. The original block has four bays on the front and two on the right return. In the ground floor are shopfronts, the corner doorway with a round head and an elaborately carved surround. On both fronts are shop windows, over which are console brackets carrying sign boards. Above, are quoins, sash windows and an eaves band. The extension has three bays, dentilled eaves and casement windows.	II
48 High Street; 54.00867°N 1.46693°W	—	Late 18th century	A shop with accommodation above, in brick, with a Westmorland slate roof, three storeys and three bays. The shopfront has a central doorway with a fanlight, fluted columns and an entablature, flanked by bow windows with segmental fanlights. The upper floors contain sash windows with channelled wedge lintels.	II
82 High Street; 54.00932°N 1.46850°W		Late 18th century	A shop with working premises at the rear, it is rendered, and has a floor band, a moulded eaves band, and a hipped tile roof. There are three storeys, three bays at the front, and possibly six bays along the sides. In the ground floor is a shopfront with a central doorway, and the upper floors contain sash windows in architraves, the sills of those in the top floor on paired brackets.	II
89 High Street; 54.00958°N 1.46920°W		Late 18th century	A house, later used for other purposes, in brick and limestone on a stone plinth, with a pantile roof. There are two storeys, two bays, a rear extension and a lean-to on the right. In the ground floor is a doorway and a bow window to the right, and above are two casement windows.	II
112 and 114 High Street; 54.01075°N 1.46976°W		Late 18th century	A pair of houses, later used for other purposes, in limestone, with wooden gutter brackets and a stone slate roof. There are three storeys and three bays. In the middle bay is a doorway above which are two blind windows, and in the outer bays are sash windows. All the openings have projecting sills and wedge lintels.	II
118, 120 and 122 High Street; 54.01087°N 1.46987°W		Late 18th century	A row of three houses in red brick on a plinth, with two storeys. The two left houses have a roof of Westmorland slate, and five bays. There are two doorways with stone architraves, fanlights and cornices. In the extreme left and right are round-arched passage entrances. The ground floor contains three bow windows with moulded cornices, and in the upper floor are five sash windows with incised wedge lintels. The right house is lower, with a stone slate roof and two bays. It contains an elliptical carriage arch, a bow window in the ground floor and sash windows above.	II
19 Kirkgate; 54.00829°N 1.46884°W		Late 18th century	The house is in brick on a rendered plinth, with stone dressings, quoins, and a stone slate roof. There are three storeys, one bay, and a rear extension with two storeys and one bay. The doorway has a round-arched head with rusticated voussoirs and quoins, and a fanlight. To its left is a bow window with a cornice. In the upper floors are sash windows, in the top floor horizontally-sliding, both with splayed lintels and double keystones.	II
21 and 23 Kirkgate; 54.00831°N 1.46894°W		Late 18th century	A pair of rendered houses on a rendered plinth, with quoins on the left, floor and eaves bands, and a Westmorland slate roof with a moulded stone kneeler on the left. There are three storeys and two bays. In the centre are paired doorways with blocked traceried fanlights. These are flanked by bow windows over cellar openings, and in the upper floors are sash windows.	II
53 and 55 Kirkgate and railings 54.00884°N 1.47099°W		Late 18th century	A pair of houses in stone with a stone slate roof, three storeys and basements, and four bays. Steps lead down to the paired central doorways, and they are flanked by bow windows. In the upper floors the outer bays contain sash windows, the inner bays contain blind windows, and all have incised lintels. In front of the houses are railings on gritstone kerbs. The railings have closely spaced rails with bulbous finials and a top rail.	II
8 and 10 Market Place; 54.00798°N 1.46663°W		Late 18th century	A pair of houses, later shops, in brown and cream brick, with wooden gutter brackets, and a Westmorland slate roof with stone coping. There are three storeys and four bays. In the ground floor is a shopfront, and the upper floors contain sash windows in architraves, with projecting sills and wedge lintels.	II
24 York Place; 54.00685°N 1.46363°W		Late 18th century	A small factory, later converted for other uses, in limestone with a pantile roof. There are four storeys and five bays. In the centre is a double door, to its left is a doorway with a fanlight, and above is a double loading door with a segmental head. The windows are sashes, in the ground floor in architraves, and those in the first floor horizontally-sliding.	II
Stables, Bilton Hall; 54.01180°N 1.49116°W	—	Late 18th century	The stables and coach house, later used for other purposes, are in gritstone with a slate roof. They form an L-shaped plan, mainly in two storeys, and partly in three. The west range contains stable doorways, a blocked carriage arch, and a casement window. In the north range is a bow window and sash windows, and the three-storey part has shelves to a pigeon loft in the top storey, with a pyramidal roof, a ball finial and a weathervane.	II
Castle Mill: Building to the north 54.00645°N 1.47069°W		Late 18th century	The mill building is in gritstone and brick, with roofs of pantile and Westmorland slate. There are three storeys and ten bays, following the curve of the road, and a two-storey three-bay brick extension to the north. On the east front is a loading door, and the windows are a mix of sashes, some horizontally-sliding, and square windows; some windows are blocked. At the south end is a two-storey porch linking the building with another range.	II
Castle Mill Wheelhouse Block; 54.00627°N 1.47120°W		Late 18th century	The mill building is in gritstone on the ground floor and in brick above, and has floor bands and a hipped Westmorland slate roof. It is built over the mill race, and has three storeys, and fronts of seven and three bays. The windows are sashes in architraves, those in the upper two floors with cambered heads.	II
Conyngham Hall; 54.01140°N 1.47835°W		Late 18th century	A large house, later used for other purposes, in gritstone, with roofs of Westmorland slate and stone slate. There are two storeys, a front of three bays, and many extensions at the rear. The front has sill bands, a dentilled eaves cornice, a blocking course, a balustraded parapet with finials, and a hipped roof. In the centre is a portico with pairs of giant Ionic columns carrying an entablature with a triangular dentilled and corniced pediment. The doorway has a segmental pediment, and a keystone with a female mask and grapes, and has flanking windows. The windows are sashes in architraves, those in the ground floor with triangular pediments, and in the upper floor with keystones. In the left return are two two-storey canted bay windows, and the right return contains a bay window with a balustraded parapet.	II*
Gates, gate piers and walls, Conyngham Hall; 54.01037°N 1.47792°W		Late 18th century	The gate piers flanking the entrance to the drive are in stone, square in section, and about 3 metres (9.8 ft) high. Each pier has a plinth, three bands on the shaft, a wreathed shield, a cornice and a ball finial. The double gates are in wrought iron, and contain scrolls and a monogram, The flanking walls curve towards the house, on a plinth, and have gabled coping.	II
Stable block, Conyngham Hall; 54.01151°N 1.47901°W		Late 18th century	The stable block and coach house, later used for other purposes, are in gritstone with a Westmorland slate roof. They form three ranges around a courtyard, the rear range with two storeys, and with one storey elsewhere. The main range has five bays, the middle bay projecting, and containing a carriage arch with a trefoil head, and a triangular coped pediment. The flanking bays contain square recesses, and a moulded eaves cornice. The middle and end bays of the rear range contain round-arched recesses.	II
Fysche Hall; 54.00659°N 1.46335°W		Late 18th century	A large house, later used for other purposes, in limestone, with a moulded eaves cornice, a triangular pediment containing a blocked oculus and a carved compass and square, and a Westmorland slate roof. There are two storeys, five bays, and a two-bay range to the right. In the centre is a portico with Tuscan columns carrying an entablature. The doorway has a moulded architrave, a traceried fanlight and a fluted lintel. The windows are sashes with lintels and keystones.	II
George and Dragon Public House; 54.00624°N 1.46651°W		Late 18th century	The public house is in red brick on a rendered plinth, with a wooden eaves band and gutter brackets, and a Westmorland slate roof. There are two storeys and two bays. The central doorway has a plain surround and a cornice, and is flanked by two-storey bow windows.	II
Hunter's Lodge; 54.00966°N 1.47068°W		Late 18th century	The house is in limestone with a stone slate roof. There are two storeys and two bays. The central doorway has an architrave, a fanlight and a cornice. To its left is a small square window, and above it is a round-arched sash window with decorative glazing. To the right in the upper floor is a sash window in an architrave.	II
Newton House Hotel; 54.00729°N 1.46418°W		Late 18th century	A house, later part of a hotel, in limestone, with a sill band, paired gutter brackets and a stone slate roof. There are three storeys and three bays. In the right bay is a wide carriage arch with rusticated voussoirs and a keystone with a mask and a scroll motif. In the centre is a doorway in an architrave, and to its left is a sash window. Above are sash windows, those in the left two bays in the middle floor with cast iron balconies, and the window in the right bay tripartite. All the windows have segmental-arched channelled wedge lintels.	II
Nidd View Cottage; 54.00857°N 1.47010°W		Late 18th century	The house is in brick on the front and limestone at the rear, on a stone plinth, with quoins on the right, and a pantile roof. There are two storeys at the front and four at the rear, and two bays. The doorway on the left has a segmental head, and to the right is a passage door with a quoined surround and a large incised gritstone lintel. The windows are sashes, those in the upper floor with segmental heads.	II
Saint Johns Cottage; 54.01116°N 1.47188°W		Late 18th century	The cottage is rendered, and has two storeys and two bays, the right bay taller. On the left bay is a pantile roof, and the right bay has a roof of Westmorland slate. The doorway is in the centre, in the right bay are sash windows, and the left bay contains a horizontal-sliding sash in the ground floor and a small two-light window above.	II
The Beeches; 54.00964°N 1.47056°W		Late 18th century	The house is in limestone with a hipped stone slate roof. There are three storeys, one bay on the front facing the road, and three bays on the left return. The front has a painted plinth, in the ground floor are paired sash windows under a segmental arch, and in the upper floors are sash windows with flat heads. All the windows have architraves and voussoirs.	II
The Hermitage; 54.00904°N 1.47241°W		Late 18th century	Two houses, later used for other purposes, rendered and with a Westmorland slate roof. There are two storeys and three bays. In the centre is a doorway with a fanlight, and there is a separate porch. The windows are a mix of sashes and casements, and in the roof is a dormer.	II
Wall, pier and lamp 54.00896°N 1.47108°W		Late 18th century	The revetment wall is in gritstone with rounded coping and a terminal, and is about 9 metres (30 ft) long. At the west end is a square pier, with a narrow projecting band and a pyramidal capstone. On the top is a wrought iron lamp bracket with four S-scroll feet and four curved arms.	II
Weir across River Nidd; 54.00653°N 1.47136°W		Late 18th century	The weira cross the River Nidd is in gritstone. It is composed of massive blocks, and is about 40 metres (130 ft) wide.	II
Low Bridge; 54.00323°N 1.46760°W		1779	The bridge carries Bland's Hill (B6163 road) over the River Nidd. It is in limestone, and consists of two segmental arches. The downstream cutwater is round, and the upstream one is pointed. These are carried up as double pilasters, with widened coping on the flat parapets.	II
Tenter Lodge; 54.00939°N 1.47362°W		1780	A house, later divided into two, in red brick with a hipped Westmorland slate roof. There are five bays, mostly in two storeys, and to the right is a two -storey single-bay embattled tower. The doorway has panelled reveals, reeded pilasters, a fanlight and a deep cornice. Most of the windows are sashes with segmental heads. In the left return is an embattled block.	II
Prison attached to the Court House; 54.00682°N 1.46894°W		1786	The prison, later used for other purposes, is in gritstone, with stone corbels carrying the gutters, and a hipped stone slate roof. There is a single storey with cells below, and one bay. On the front is a three-light segmental-headed window with a transom, and in the left return are two large round-headed windows.	II
3 York Place; 54.00737°N 1.46431°W		c. 1790	A house, later a club, in gritstone with chamfered quoins, a sill band, and a fluted eaves cornice. There are three storeys and five bays. The central doorway has panelled reveals, a fanlight, a reeded architrave with paterae, and a keystone. The windows are sashes with wedge lintels.	II
43, 45 and 47 Bond End; 54.00999°N 1.47366°W		1794	A Wesleyan chapel converted into three houses, in stone. There are three storeys, a gable end with three bays, and five bays on the right return. In the gable end are two doorways, and the third doorway is in the return. The doors and windows date from the 20th century, and in the gable is a blind oculus.	II
2, 4, 6 and 8 Brewerton Street; 54.00670°N 1.46745°W		Late 18th to early 19th century	A row of four houses, in two pairs, in limestone, with a tile roof and an eaves course of stone slates. There are three storeys and four bays. In the centre of each pair are two doorways, one with a fanlight. The middle two bays contain bow windows., and the other windows are sash windows in architraves.	II
30 Cheapside; 54.00701°N 1.46719°W		Late 18th to early 19th century	A house in brick with a Westmorland slate roof, three storeys and one bay. In the ground floor, steps lead up to a doorway on the right, with a fanlight and a segmental-ached head. To the left is a bow window, with a cellar opening below. The upper floors contain sash windows in architraves, with segmental-arched heads.	II
61, 63 and 65 High Street; 54.00897°N 1.46825°W		Late 18th to early 19th century	A row of three shops with accommodation above, in painted brick with Westmorland slate roofs. There are three storeys, and each shop has one bay. In the ground floor are shopfronts, and in the middle floor, the left two shops have canted bay windows, and in the right shop is a bow window. The top floor contains sash windows, the window in the right shop with a wedge lintel.	II
95 High Street; 54.00975°N 1.46943°W		Late 18th to early 19th century	A house in brown brick with a tile roof, three storeys and one bay. Steps lead up to the doorway on the left that has a rectangular fanlight and a moulded cornice. To the right is a bow window, the middle floor contains a bay window, and in the top floor is a sash window.	II
124 and 126 High Street; 54.01098°N 1.47001°W	—	Late 18th to early 19th century	A pair of houses in limestone with a stone slate roof. There are three storeys and two bays. In the outer parts of the ground floor are doorways with divided fanlights. Between the doorways are bow windows, and the upper floors contain sash windows.	II
6A Waterside; 54.00901°N 1.47306°W		Late 18th to early 19th century	The house is in gritstone with a hipped Westmorland slate roof. There are two storeys, a square plan, and two bays. The central doorway has a round-arched fanlight, and above it is a blocked oculus. In the outer bays are round-arched sash windows.	II
Byards Lodge and Byards Cottage; 54.01234°N 1.47101°W	—	Late 18th to early 19th century	A large house divided into two, in limestone with slate roofs. Byards Lodge has two storeys and three bays, flanked by single-storey single-bay wings. It has a dentilled eaves cornice, and roof coping with ball finials on the wings. The doorway has Tuscan columns with a triangular pediment and a fanlight, and the windows are sashes with flat arches. The cottage has a single-storey single-bay link to the main house, and a two-storey two -bay range, the middle bay semicircular with a conical roof.	II
Grimbald Bridge; 54.00035°N 1.44918°W		Late 18th to early 19th century	The bridge carries Wetherby Road over the River Nidd. It is in gritstone, and consists of two round arches. There are cutwaters on each side, rising as pilasters to the parapet, which has triangular-section coping, and there is a band at road level.	II
Hearse house, railings and gate pier 54.00970°N 1.47098°W		Late 18th to early 19th century	The former hearse house is in limestone with a stone slate roof. There is a single storey and rectangular plan. It contains double doors at the east end, and a small window at the west end. The railings are in wrought iron on a stone sill, with spear finials, and a ramped top edge. The gate pier is in gritstone, about 2 metres (6 ft 7 in) high, and has a rounded top.	II
National School for Boys; 54.00736°N 1.46805°W		1814	The school, later used for other purposes, is in stone with a hipped Westmorland slate roof. There is a single storey and a rectangular plan, with fronts of five and two bays, and a lower single-storey three-bay range to the left. The windows are sashess with shouldered wedge lintels, and above the eaves level is a dated and inscribed stone tablet with scroll decoration.	II
10 and 12 Gracious Street; 54.00709°N 1.46533°W		c. 1820	A pair of houses in limestone with a slate roof. There are three storeys and two bays. In the outer parts are doorways with decorative fanlights. The windows on the front are sashes with stone sills and lintels, and elsewhere is a casement window and a horizontally-sliding sash window.	II
7 Bond End; 54.01122°N 1.47098°W		Early 19th century|	A pair of cottages combined into one house, it is in painted brick, with Westmorland slate roofs. There are two storeys, the left part has two bays, and the lower part to the right has one bay. In the left part is a doorway and a shop window to the right with a fascia board, and above are sash windows. The right part has a doorway to the right, and a casement window in each floor.	II
12 Bond End; 54.01139°N 1.47127°W		Early 19th century	A house on a corner site, it is rendered, and has cogged eaves and a Westmorland slate roof. There are two storeys and two bays, the right bay canted. The windows are recessed sashes with cambered heads, and on the right return is a later porch.	II
108 Briggate; 54.00401°N 1.46766°W		Early 19th century	A house in limestone, with a Westmorland slate roof, two storeys and one bay. On the front is a doorway in an architrave, and to its left is a round-arched opening with voussoirs and quoins. To the right is a horizontally-sliding sash window, and in the upper floor is a casement window. The doorway and windows have lintels with keystones.	II
2 and 4 Castlegate; 54.00710°N 1.46717°W		Early 19th century	Two houses, later a house and a shop, in brick on a rendered plinth, with a Westmorland slate roof. There are three storeys and two bays. Steps lead up to the doorway with a fanlight in the house to the right, and to its right is a bow window. The shop on the left has a doorway approached by steps, and a shop window to its right. The upper floors contain sash windows flanking blind windows.	II
2A Castlegate; 54.00705°N 1.46720°W		Early 19th century	A house or factory, later a shop, in brick with a hipped Westmorland slate roof. There are three storeys and a half-cellar, and three bays, the right bay canted. In the left two bays is a shopfront, and the right bay contains a partly blocked window to the half-cellar with a wedge lintel. The upper floors contain sash windows with channelled wedge lintels.	II
26 and 28 Cheapside; 54.00696°N 1.46709°W		Early 19th century	A pair of rendered shops, with quoins, floor bands, and a Westmorland slate roof. There are three storeys and two bays. In the centre are paired doorways with fanlights, flanked by shop windows with cornices. The upper floors contain sash windows in architraves.	II
97 High Street; 54.00979°N 1.46949°W		Early 19th century	A house in red brick, the ground floor rendered, on a plinth, with a dentilled eaves cornice, and a Westmorland slate roof. There are two storeys and four bays. The doorway in the left bay has a fanlight, and the windows are sashes, those in the upper floor with wedge lintels.	II
115 and 117 High Street; 54.01105°N 1.47045°W		Early 19th century	A pair of houses in gritstone with sill bands and a Westmorland slate roof. There are three storeys and three bays. In the centre, steps lead up to paired doorways with fanlights. To the left is a shop window, to the right is a bow window, and on the far left is a segmental-arched passageway with voussoirs. In the upper floors are sash windows with wedge lintels.	II
33, 35 and 37 Kirkgate; 54.00853°N 1.46995°W		Early 19th century	A row of three rendered houses on a stone plinth, with quoins, an eaves band, and a tile roof with shaped kneelers. There are two storeys at the front and four at the rear, and four bays. On the front is a triple doorway, with two house doors flanking a passage door. The house doorways have Doric pilasters, and over the three doors is a continuous heavy cornice. To the right is another house doorway with a similar surround. The windows are a mix of sashes, some horizontally-sliding, and casements.	II
41, 43 and 45 Windsor Lane and 16 and 18 Iles Lane; 54.00595°N 1.46465°W		Early 19th century	A block of houses on a corner site in limestone and some brick at the rear, with a hipped Westmorland slate roof. There are three storeys, four bays on the front and four on the right return. On the front are three doorways with wedge lintels and a round-arched passage doorway. The windows are sashes, those in the lower Iwo floors with wedge lintels.	II
8 and 10 York Place; 54.00711°N 1.46427°W		Early 19th century	A pair of houses in brick with shaped gutter brackets and a Westmorland slate roof. There are three storeys and attics, and each house has two bays with the doorway on the right, each with an architrave and a cornice. In the left bay is a canted bay window, above which is a bow window. In the third bay is a two-storey canted bay window, the other windows are sashes with segmental heads and channelled wedge lintels, and on the roof is a dormer.	II
Castle Mill Cottage; 54.00600°N 1.47084°W		Early 19th century	The house is in gritstone, and has a Westmorland slate roof with inturned kneelers. There are four storeys, one bay, and a projection on the left. Stone steps lead up to an entrance on the first floor. The windows are casements, some with stepped lintels.	II
Four Quarters and Shipton House; 54.00702°N 1.46407°W		Early 19th century	A pair of houses in brick with a Westmorland slate roof. There are three storeys, and each house has two bays. In the centre are paired doorways with fluted architraves, fanlights, an entablature and a cornice. To the left is a bow window, and to the right is a canted bay window. The upper floors contain sash windows in architraves, with incised lintels, and in the roof of the right house are two gabled dormers.	II
Gallon steps, lamp posts and walls 54.00835°N 1.47024°W		Early 19th century	Seven flights of steps linking Waterside and Kirkgate, consisting of gritstone slabs over brick and stone, with cobble platforms between the flights. The walls are in gritstone with pointed coping, and there are two cast iron lamp posts with fluted columns.	II
Lamp post east of St John the Baptist's Church; 54.00955°N 1.47134°W	—	Early 19th century	The lamp post in the churchyard to the east of the church is in cast iron. It has a square base with lion masks, the lower half of the shaft is reeded, and the upper half is octagonal. On the shaft is fern-leaf decoration, there are four curved brackets, and a projecting arm with a moulded finial.	II
March House; 54.00348°N 1.46764°W		Early 19th century	The house is in limestone, with a sill band, a moulded eaves cornice, and a hipped Westmorland slate roof. Three are two storeys and attics, and fronts of three bays. The doorway has an architrave, a fanlight and a cornice. The windows are sashes, those in the ground floor with lintels cut to form shallow segmental arches, and above are dormers.	II
Memorial to Ely Hargrove; 54.00946°N 1.47159°W	—	Early 19th century	A chest tomb in the churchyard of St John the Baptist's Church to the south of the church, and is to the memory of members of the Hargrove family. It is in gritstone, and has a moulded plinth, octagonal fielded panels to the ends, a central octagonal fielded panel flanked by hexagonal fielded panels to the sides. The large top slab has roll-moulded edges and deeply-incised lettering.	II
The Groves Inn; 54.00848°N 1.46728°W		Early 19th century	Two houses combined into a public house, it is rendered and has a floor band and a Westmorland slate roof. There are three storeys and four bays. On the front are two doorways with architraves, fanlights and cornices, and to the left is a passage door. Flanking the right doorway are canted bay windows, and in the upper floors are recessed sash windows with cambered heads.	II
23 Bond End; 54.01106°N 1.47211°W		c. 1830	The house, at the end of a row, is in gritstone on a plinth, with a Westmorland slate roof and stone coping on the right gable. There are two storeys and three bays. Steps lead up to the central doorway that has an architrave, a round-arched fanlight, an entablature and a cornice. This is flanked by tripartite bow windows, and the windows in the upper floor are sashes.	II
St Mary's Church; 54.01081°N 1.47265°W		1831	The church is in gritstone, with a sill band, a lintel band, an eaves cornice, and a Westmorland slate roof. There are two storeys and a front of five bays, the middle three bays projecting under a pediment containing a cross in relief. In the centre is a projecting porch, above which is a round-arched niche containing a statue. Most of the windows are sashes.	II
Presbytery, St Mary's Church; 54.01087°N 1.47246°W	—	1831	The presbytery is in gritstone with a hipped Westmorland slate roof. There are three storeys and three bays. In the centre is a doorway with a fanlight, and to its right is a bay window. To the left, and in the middle floor, are sash windows, and the top floor contains three blind windows.	II
11, 13, 15 and 17 Briggate; 54.00617°N 1.46662°W		Early to mid 19th century	Two pairs of houses with two storeys. The left pair is in red brick with a stone slate roof and three bays. There are two doorways with wedge lintels, to the left of each is a bow window, and to the right is a round-arched passage entry. In the upper floor are sash windows with wedge lintels. The right pair is in painted brick with a Westmorland slate roof, and two bays. There are two doorways with bow windows to the right, and in the upper floor are sash windows, all with wedge lintels. Over the right bay is a dormer window.	II
19 Briggate; 54.00607°N 1.46682°W	cntre	Early to mid 19th century	Two houses combined into one, in red brick, with paired gutter brackets and a Westmorland slate roof. There are two storeys and four bays. In the right bay is a wide carriage arch. Towards the left are paired doorways with rectangular fanlights, an entablature and a cornice. The windows are sashes, above the doorways is a blind window, and all these openings have wedge lintels.	II
98 and 100 High Street; 54.00995°N 1.46932°W		Early to mid 19th century	Two houses in gritstone with stone gutter brackets and a Westmorland slate roofs. There are three storeys and attics and a front of four bays. The doorway on the front has an architrave, a fanlight, and an entablature with triglyphs and a moulded cornice. In the outer parts are blocked doorways, and the windows are sashes with incised lintels. In the right return is a doorway with flanking bay windows.	II
Castle Mill Weaving Shed; 54.00617°N 1.47102°W		Early to mid 19th century	The weaving shed is in gritstone with a hipped Westmorland slate roof. There are two storeys, eleven bays on the front, and three on the return. The windows are large horizontally-sliding sashes, and in the left return is a loading door with a pulley rail.	II
Harts Horns Public House; 54.00793°N 1.46624°W		Early to mid 19th century	The public house is in rendered limestone and has a Westmorland slate roof. There are three storeys and three bays. The doorway has an architrave with triglyphs, and a cornice. In the ground floor are three bow windows, and the upper floors contain recessed sash windows with wedge lintels. To the right is a two-storey two-bay extension.	II
The Wellington Inn; 54.007599°N 1.46687°W		Early to mid 19th century	Two houses, later one public house, in red brick, with paired gutter brackets and a Westmorland slate roof. There are two storeys and four bays. At the left end is a doorway, there is another doorway in the third bay, and both have divided fanlights. Above the right doorway is a blind window, all the other windows are sashes, and all the openings have wedge lintels.	II
National School for Infants and Girls; 54.00763°N 1.46848°W		1837	The school, later used for other purposes, is in stone, with a moulded sill band, paired gutter brackets, and a hipped Westmorland slate roof. There are two storeys, fronts of five and two bays, and a two-storey extension to the rear. The doorways have shouldered wedge lintels, the windows in the main block are sashes, and in the extension they are cross windows.	II
Three stone troughs and walls 54.00908°N 1.46358°W		1841 and earlier	The row of three troughs is in gritstone, the northern trough lower. The retaining wall on the west has round coping, there are two short walls at right angles, one dated, and between the middle and northern trough is another wall. In the southern wall is a pipe, and the water passes through the three troughs and empties into a drain.	II
35 and 35A Market Place; 54.00791°N 1.46763°W		Mid 19th century	Two shops in red brick, on a limestone plinth with a band, quoins on the right, and a hipped Westmorland slate roof. There are two storeys, and three bays curving round a corner. On the front are two shopfronts, and to the right and in the upper floor are sash windows. There is also a blind window, and all the windows have stone wedge lintels. The right return is in limestone, and contains a doorway and a sash window.	II
Knaresborough Viaduct; 54.00845°N 1.47152°W		1851	The viaduct was built by the East and West Yorkshire Junction Railway to carry its line over the River Nidd. It is in gritstone, and is about 100 metres (330 ft) long, and 30 metres (98 ft) high. The viaduct consists of four round arches. The round cutwaters are carried up as buttresses, and at the top are projecting bands and half-towers. The parapet is embattled.	II*
North portal to railway tunnel 54.01038°N 1.46781°W		c. 1851	The tunnel was built by the East and West Yorkshire Junction Railway. The portal is in gritstone, and consists of a round arch with voussoirs and a keystone. The parapet has roll moulding stepped down to the walls of the cutting.	II
South portal to railway tunnel 54.00940°N 1.46960°W		c. 1851	The tunnel was built by the East and West Yorkshire Junction Railway. The portal is in gritstone, and consists of a round arch with voussoirs, flanked by plain pilasters. It has a moulded plinth, machicolations under a string course, and a plain parapet.	II
Water tower, Knaresborough railway station 54.00942°N 1.46973°W		1851	The water tank at the northeast end of the station was built by the East and West Yorkshire Junction Railway. The rectangular base is in brick with thickened corner piers, and it carries a cast iron tank with panelled sides. On the short side of the base is a plain doorway, and on the long side is an ached window in a cast iron frame.	II
8 Castle Yard; 54.00771°N 1.46821°W		1853	A dispensary, later a private house, in millstone grit, with a moulded eaves cornice, and a Westmorland slate roof with stone coping and shaped kneelers. There are two storeys and three bays, the middle bay projecting under a triangular pediment containing an inscription. In the centre is a projecting portico with Tuscan columns, an entablature with triglyphs, a dentilled cornice, and a triangular pediment. The windows are casements in architraves.	II
Bilton Hall; 54.01150°N 1.49111°W	—	1853	The remodelling of a 17th-century country house, later used for other purposes. It is in brick with diapering, and has a stone slate roof, with two and three storeys, attics and cellars. The west front has three storeys and six bays, the outer bays projecting as gabled wings. It contains quoins, and the windows are mullioned and transomed.	II
Former Primitive Methodist Chapel; 54.00628°N 1.46719°W		1854	The chapel, later used for other purposes, is in gritstone with a Westmorland slate roof. There are two storeys, and fronts of three bays. In the centre is a porch with pilasters, incised decoration and a triangular corniced pediment, and the double doors have fanlights. The windows are sashes, and above them is a projecting band at eaves level forming the base of a triangular coped gable pediment, containing an oculus, an inscription and the date.	II
Holy Trinity Church; 54.0057°N 1.46594°W		1854–56	The church is in gritstone with a Westmorland slate roof, and consists of a nave with a clerestory, north and south aisles, a north porch, a chancel with a north vestry, and a northwest tower. The tower has three stages, angle buttresses, two and three-light windows and bell openings, and a broach spire with lucarnes.	II
42 High Street; 54.00857°N 1.46663°W		1858	A bank, later used for other purposes, in stone, with two storeys and seven bays, the left bay and the two right bays slightly recessed. The main four bays have vermiculated quoins. Above the ground floor is a dentilled cornice and an entablature with a dentilled and modillioned eaves cornice, and a balustraded parapet. In the ground floor are a doorway and windows, all with round-arched heads, rusticated quoins and vermiculated keystones, and in the upper floor are round-headed sash windows with hood moulds. In the outer bays are sash windows in architraves with cornices.	II
Former town hall 54.00801°N 1.46742°W		1862	The town hall, later used for other purposes, is in stone, with rusticated quoins, a deep moulded cornice over the ground floor, a moulded sill band, a console, a dentilled eaves cornice, and a hipped Westmorland slate roof. There are two storeys, three bays on the front, and two on the right return. On the front is an arcade of shallow segmental arches with rusticated piers, and outside these are round-arched doorways with rusticated voussoirs. The upper floor contains cross windows in architraves with cornices on consoles. Above the middle window is an inscribed dated scroll, and in front of the middle three windows is a decorative balcony. In the centre of the roof is a clock on consoles. Attached to the right return is a three-storey two-bay extension.	II
22 Finkle Street; 54.00862°N 1.46932°W		c. 1863	A gallery in brick, with stone dressings, paired gutter brackets and a Westmorland slate roof. There are two storeys and three bays. In the ground floor are four full-height windows, the middle two paired, the left of these a doorway, with long and short quoins and shouldered arches. In the upper floor are four sash windows, the middle two paired, with pointed heads and hood moulds.	II
Knaresborough railway station 54.00915°N 1.47037°W		1865	The station buildings consist of a main range with a ticket office and waiting rooms, and canopies on both sides of the track. On the approach to the station are cast iron railings. The buildings are in gritstone and cream brick, with roofs of grey slate and glazing. The main block has a single storey and ten bays, and they have deep eaves with valances. The canopies have cast iron columns with moulded bases, stiff-leaf capitals, and curved braces with circular motifs in the spandrels.	II
Signal box, Knaresborough railway station 54.00882°N 1.47089°W		1872	The signal box is in gritstone on a plinth, with quoins, a floor band, a bracketed cornice, and a hipped grey slate roof with overhanging eaves. There are two storeys and one bay, and the east end is canted. A flight of wooden steps leads to the doorway in the upper floor. The east front has a 15-bay sash window with a channelled wedge lintel over each light. Elsewhere, there is a round-arched sash window with a keystone, and horizontally-sliding sashes.	II
37 High Street; 54.00859°N 1.46720°W		1881	A bank on a corner site, later used for other purposes, in brick with dressings in stone and terracotta. There are three storeys and attics, two gabled bays on High Street, two bays on Market Place, one gabled, and a canted bay on the corner. The doorway in the corner has an elaborate stone surround, with consoles, and a dentilled segmental pediment, and above are cross windows. Most of the other windows are mullioned and transomed. In the middle floor on High Street are bay windows with plaques in the aprons. The gables have elaborate terracotta copings and wrought iron weather vanes. On the Market Place front is an inscribed plaque with a cartouche.	II
Group of telephone kiosks 54.00818°N 1.46735°W		1935	The group of three K6 type telephone kiosks is in Market Place, and they were designed by Giles Gilbert Scott. Constructed in cast iron, each has a square plan and a dome, and there are three unperforated crowns in the top panels.	II
