= The House in the Rock =

Building in Knaresborough, North Yorkshire, England

Coordinates: 54°00′12″N 1°27′57″W

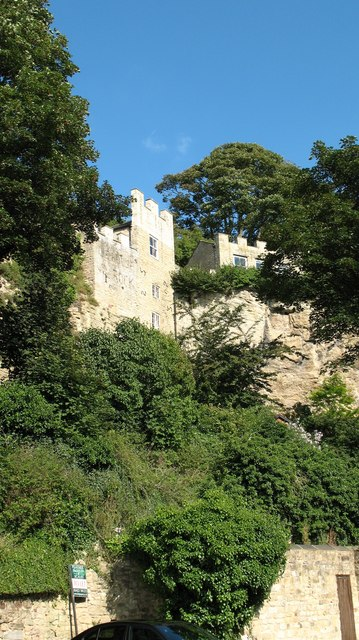
The building, in 2007

The House in the Rock is a historic building in Knaresborough, a town in North Yorkshire, in England.

The house was built between 1770 and 1786 by Thomas Hill, a local linen weaver, who carved it out of the cliff face using hand tools. He constructed the whole building with his oldest son, also Thomas, while renting a nearby cottage. Upon completion, he moved in with his wife and six children. Although there were various other rock-cut houses in the town at the time, the house was the most impressive, and Hill named it Fort Montague in honour of Lady Elizabeth Montagu, who provided some financial support. After inheriting the house, the younger Thomas operated a tearoom from the building, flew the national flag, and fired a cannon while dressed in a naval uniform. He briefly printed novelty banknotes, but this was stopped after some were mistaken for genuine notes. The Hill family lived in the house until 1996, when the front wall became unsafe. It was stabilised using a grant from English Heritage, and was sold to a new owner in 2000, who closed the tearoom. It remains in used as a private home.

The house is partly cut into a cliff face and partly built in stone, partly rendered, with a Westmorland slate roof. There are four storeys and one bay, with one room on each floor. On the east front is a segmental-arched doorway in the top floor, and on the south front is a sash window on each floor, all but the top window horizontally-sliding. At the top is an embattled parapet, and to the left is a wall, also with an embattled parapet. The building has been grade II listed since 1952.

== See also ==
- Listed buildings in Knaresborough
