= Knaresborough Old Manor House =

Building in Knaresborough, North Yorkshire, England

Coordinates: 54°00′32″N 1°28′19″W

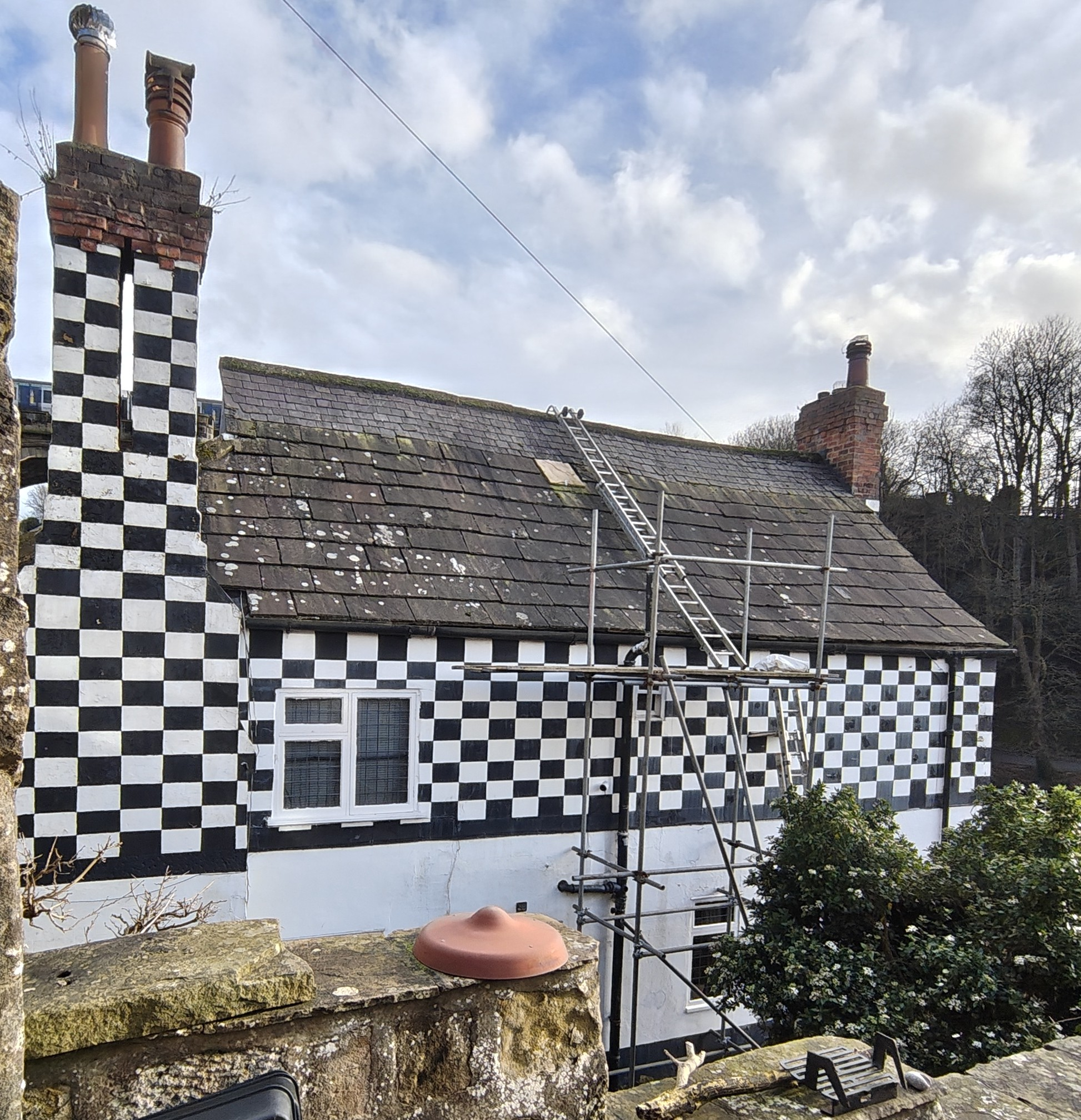
The building, in 2026

Knaresborough Old Manor House is a historic building in Knaresborough, a town in North Yorkshire, in England.

The house is believed to have originally been built in about 1208. A local legend claims that it was constructed as a hunting lodge for John, King of England, but there is no evidence of this. The building incorporated an oak tree, which still remains, concealed in a cupboard. Although it is known as the old manor house, named for the former manor of Beechill, it is not thought to have served this purpose, with the actual manor house having been near St John the Baptist Church, Knaresborough. A story claims that Oliver Cromwell stayed in the house, but he instead stayed in a house on the High Street, with his bed later being moved to the Old Manor House.

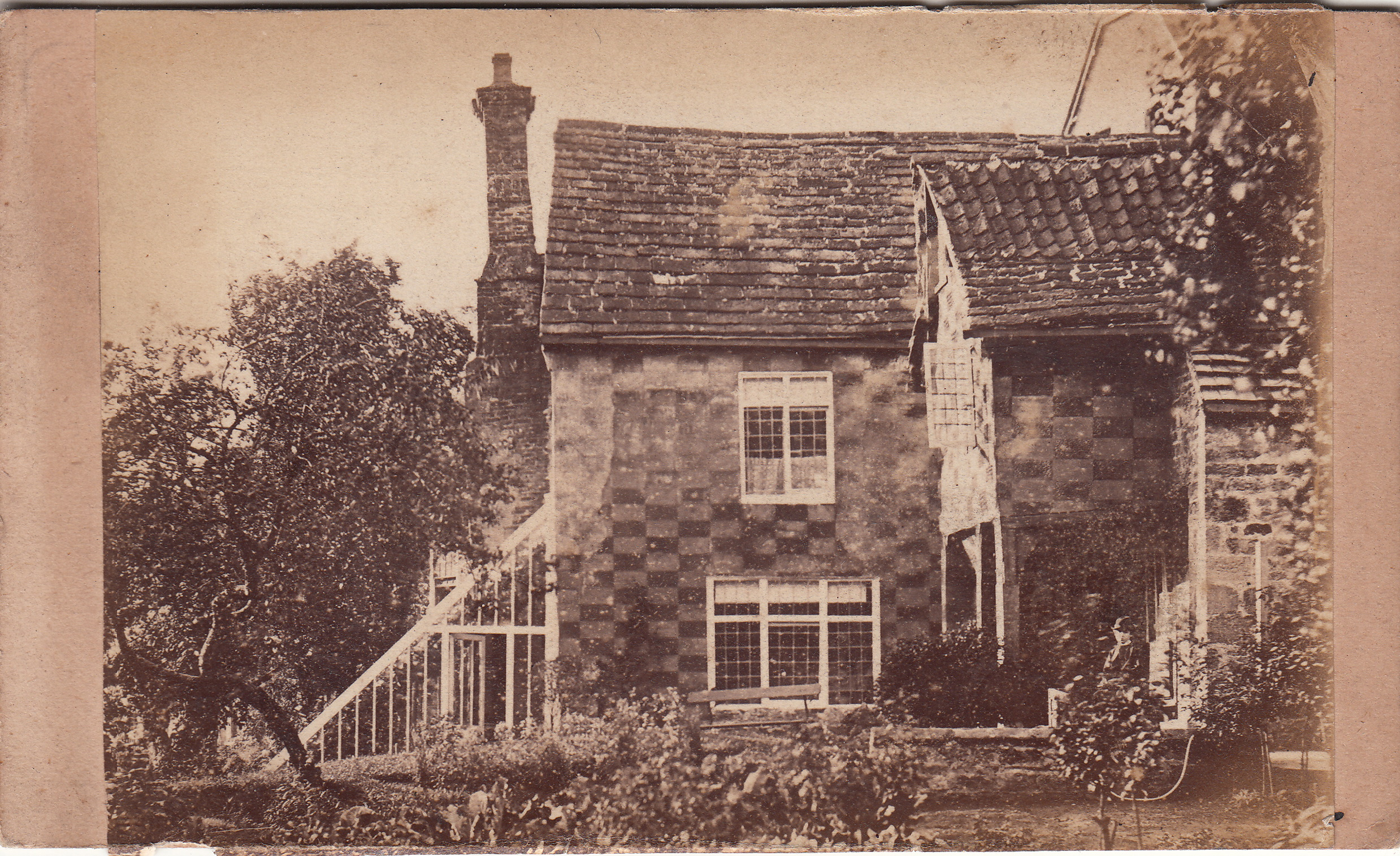
The house in the 1870s

The house was rebuilt in about 1661, and was restored in the late 19th century. An east extension was added in the 20th century. It was owned by the Roundell family from the 17th century for about 400 years. In the early 1800s, it was painted in a chequerboard pattern, supposedly by an owner who was a fan of chess. In the 1950s it was converted into a tearoom and later became a restaurant, but in the 1990s it was reconverted into a house. The building was grade II listed in 1952.

The house has a timber framed core, the walls are in rendered stone, with chequered paintwork, and the roof is in stone slate with some Westmorland slate. There are two storeys, and an L-shaped plan, and a two-storey porch projecting on the south side of the east wing. The windows date from the 19th century. Inside, the entrance hall has a stone flag floor, panelled partitions, and an open fireplace. The living room has elaborate carved panelling and a fireplace with the date 1661, and the room above has similar panelling.

== See also ==
- Listed buildings in Knaresborough
