= House on the Rock (Sighișoara) =

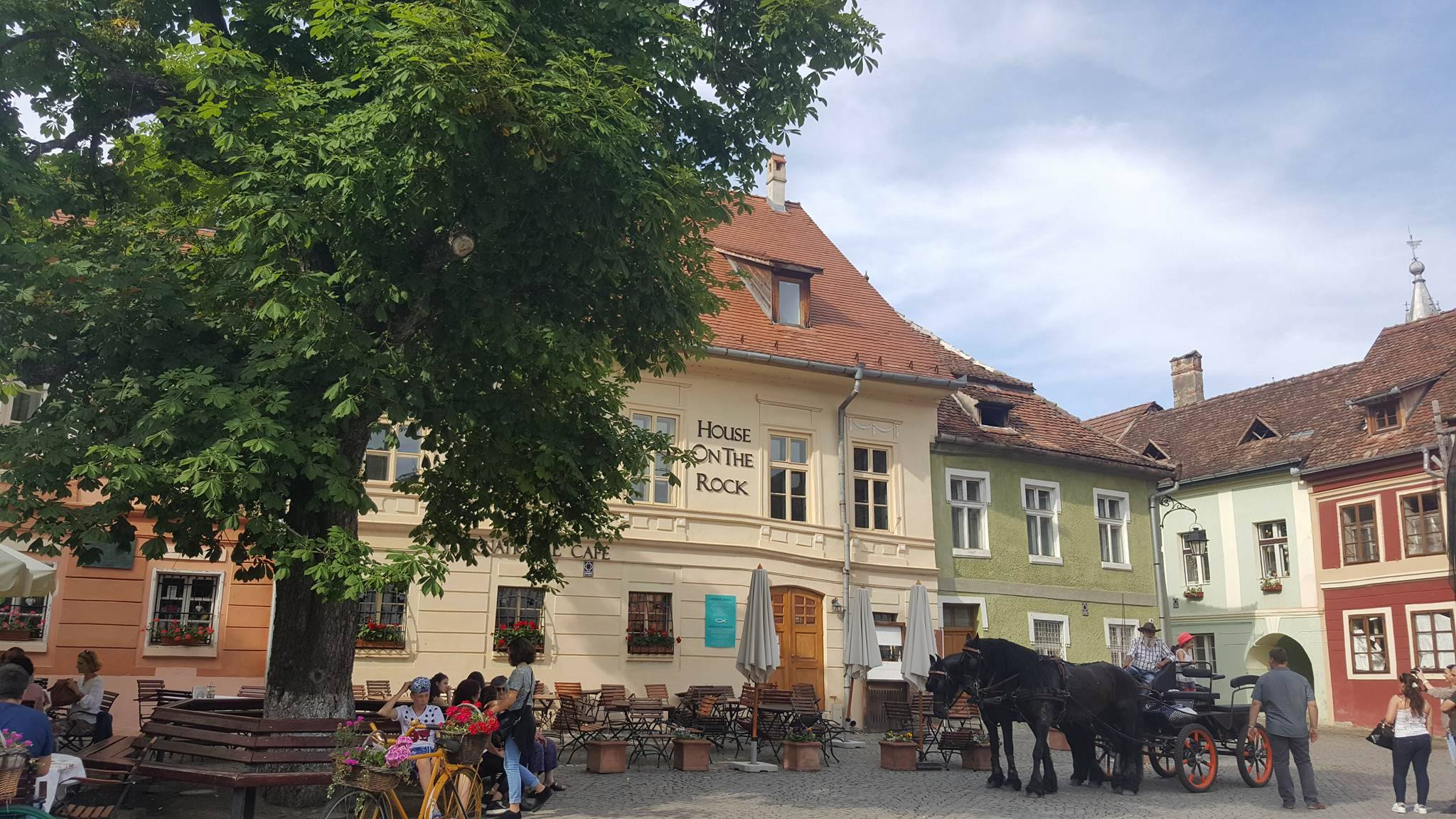
House on the Rock

House on the Rock (Casa de pe stâncă in Romanian) is an historic building in Romania.

The house was built after the great fire of 1676 and today restored by Veritas Foundation, It houses a center for intercultural exchange and an Internet cafe.
