= Knaresborough House =

Building in Knaresborough, North Yorkshire, England

Coordinates: 54°00′37″N 1°28′13″W

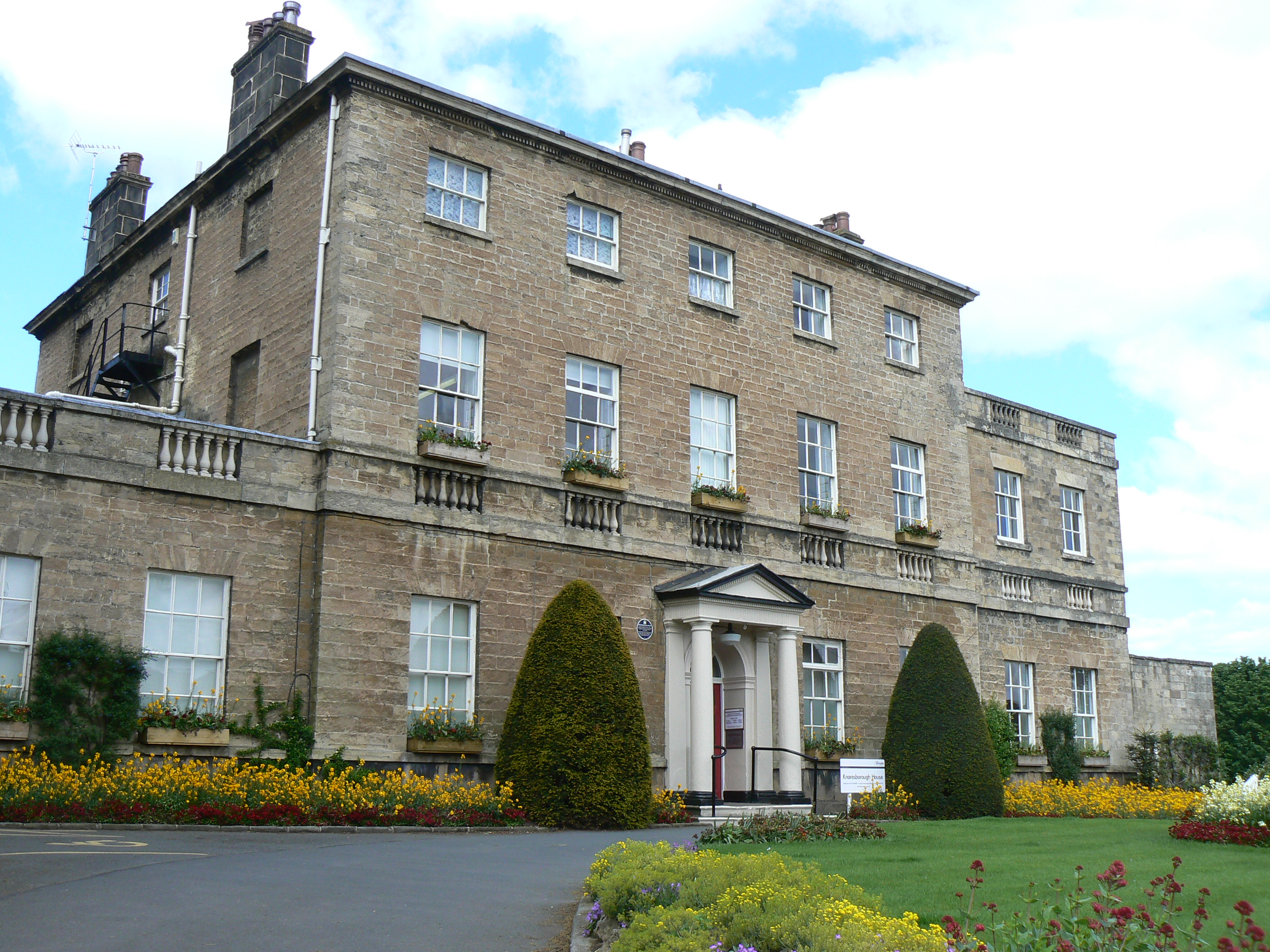
The building, in 2009

Knaresborough House is a historic building in Knaresborough, a town in North Yorkshire, in England.

The house was built in the late 18th century, for the Collins family. It remained in the family until 1951, when it was sold to Knaresborough Urban District Council, which converted it into a town hall, with a council chamber and offices. It has been grade II listed since 1952.

The house is built of limestone, with a balustraded band over the ground floor, a moulded eaves cornice, and a hipped stone slate roof. The main block has three storeys and five bays, with a single-storey two-bay wing on the left and a two-storey two-bay wing on the right. In the centre is a portico with Tuscan columns carrying a fluted frieze, a dentilled cornice, and a triangular pediment, and a doorway with a fanlight. The windows are sashes. Inside, there is a cantilevered staircase, with a landing window containing painted glass, depicting coats of arms and monograms of the Collins family. The council chamber has a decorative plaster ceiling, and a wooden fireplace carved in the Classical style.

== See also ==
- Listed buildings in Knaresborough
