= Conyngham Hall =

Building in Knaresborough, North Yorkshire, England

Coordinates: 54°00′41″N 1°28′43″W

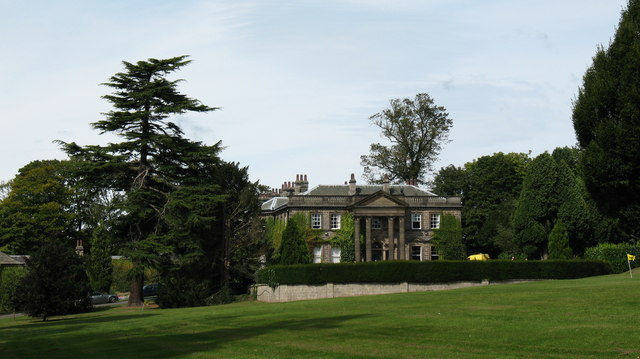
The building, in 2007

Conyngham Hall is a historic building in Knaresborough, a town in North Yorkshire, in England.

Coghill Hall was built in about 1555. In 1796 it was purchased by Ellen, Countess of Conyngham, who rebuilt the house, and named it after herself. It was altered in the mid 19th century, with a range of rooms at the front and a portico added, probably for Basil Thomas Woodd. The house was requisitioned during World War II, and served as a hospital for injured servicemen. In 1945, the house was purchased by Knaresborough Urban District Council, which leased it to Tilcon Connecticut, and from 1965 until 1986 leased the grounds for use as Knaresborough Zoo. The property has remained in council ownership since, most recently rented to small businesses, with the former stables serving as an innovation centre.

The hall has been grade II* listed since 1952. It is built of gritstone, with roofs of Westmorland slate and stone slate. There are two storeys, a front of three bays, and many extensions at the rear. The front has sill bands, a dentilled eaves cornice, a blocking course, a balustraded parapet with finials, and a hipped roof. In the centre is a portico with pairs of giant Ionic columns carrying an entablature with a triangular dentilled and corniced pediment. The doorway has a segmental pediment, and a keystone with a female mask and grapes, and has flanking windows. The windows are sashes in architraves, those in the ground floor with triangular pediments, and in the upper floor with keystones. In the left return are two two-storey canted bay windows, and the right return contains a bay window with a balustraded parapet.

Inside, the entrance hall has Doric order columns, and leads to the staircase hall. The former library has 19th-century panelling, an overmantle in the Jacobean style, and a moulded ceiling depicting women and male warriors. The dining room has 18th-century plasterwork, alcoves with fitted tables, and a marble fireplace. Several upstairs doors are decorated with 18th-century paintings of women, wheat and scrolls. There are brick-vaulted cellars, a dumb waiter, and some early plasterwork and fitted cupboards.

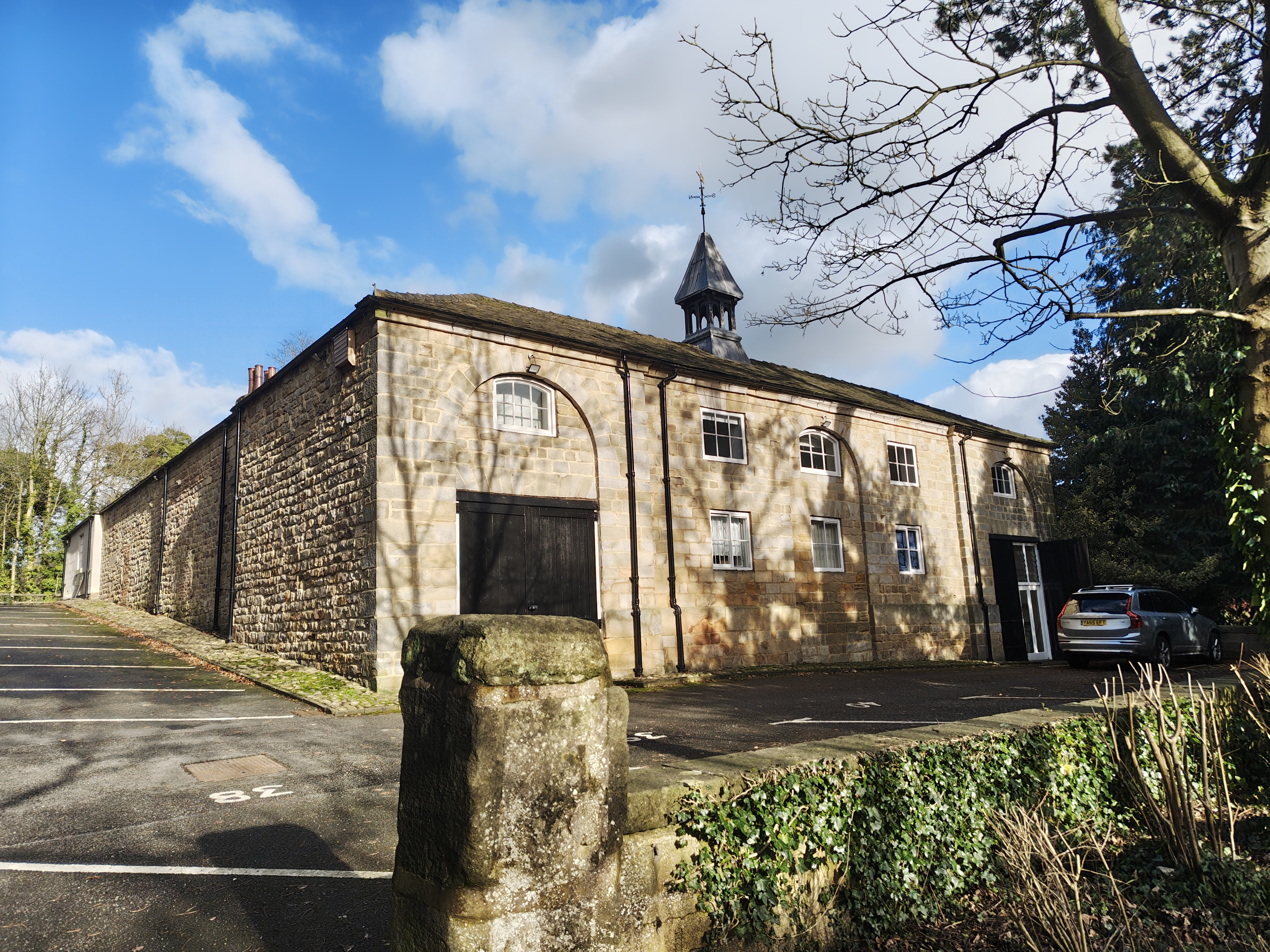
The stable block

The stable block and coach house is also late 18th century, and is grade II listed. It is built of gritstone with a Westmorland slate roof. It forms three ranges around a courtyard, the rear range with two storeys, and with one storey elsewhere. The main range has five bays, the middle bay projecting, and containing a carriage arch with a trefoil head, and a triangular coped pediment. The flanking bays contain square recesses, and a moulded eaves cornice. The middle and end bays of the rear range contain round-arched recesses.

== See also ==
- Grade II* listed buildings in North Yorkshire (district)
- Listed buildings in Knaresborough
