= Knaresborough =

Market town and civil parish in North Yorkshire, England

Coordinates: 54°00′34″N 1°27′48″W

- Town
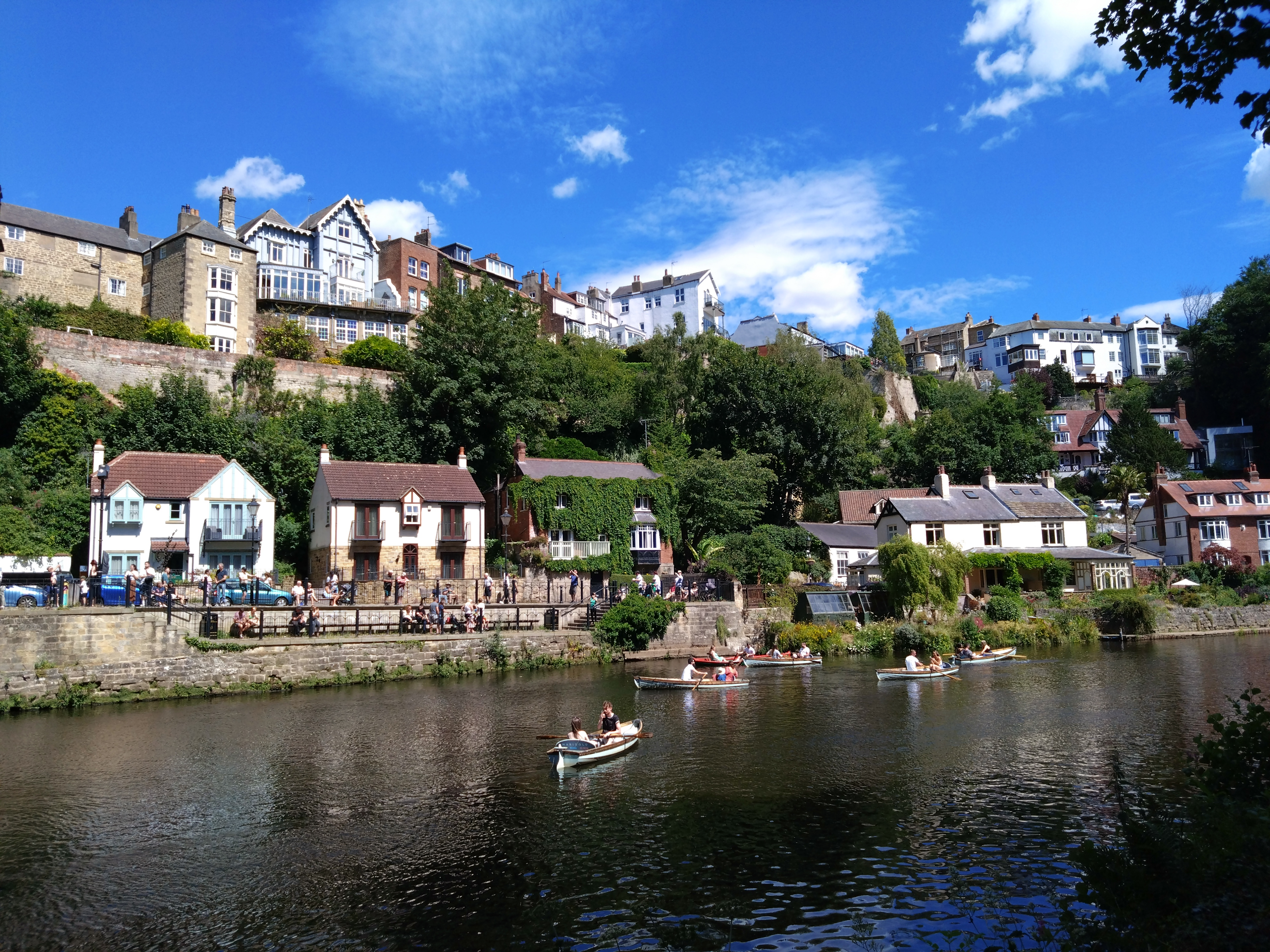
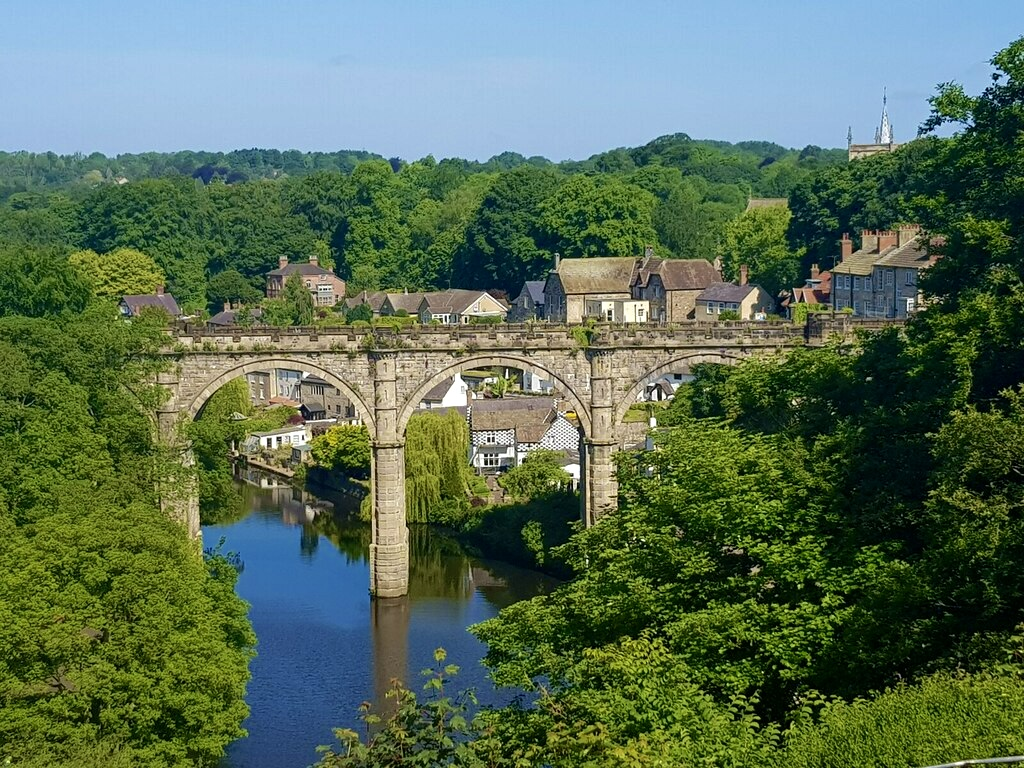
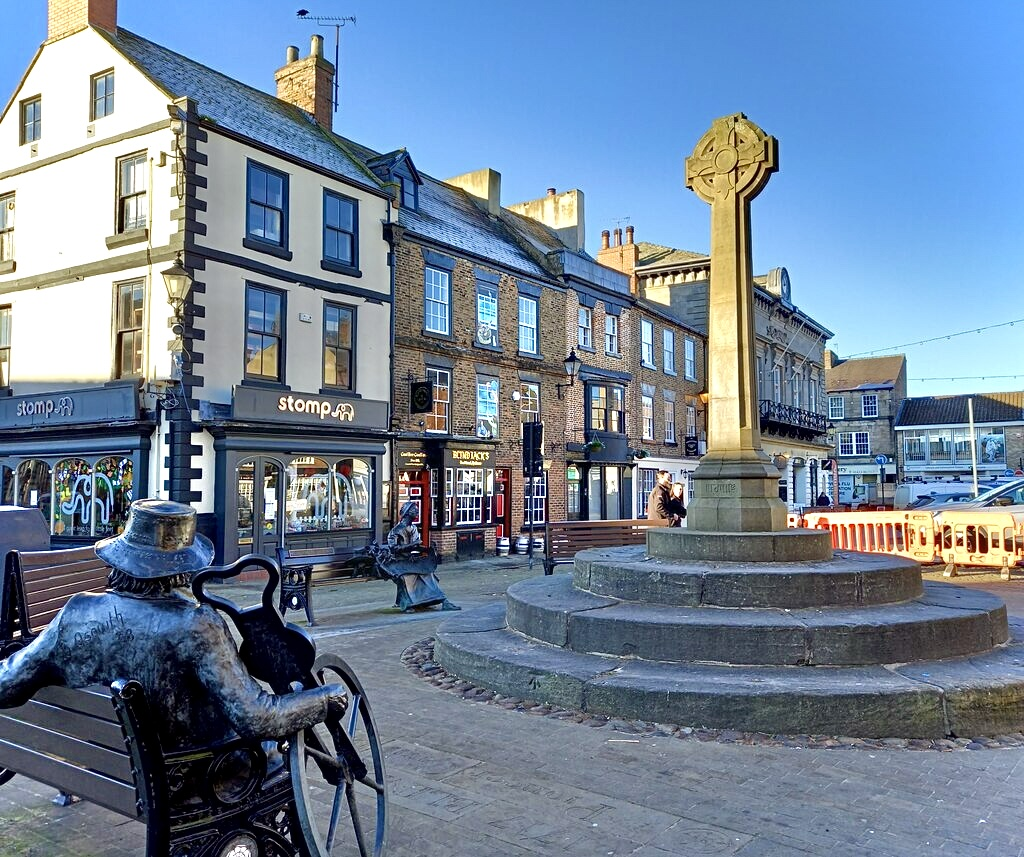
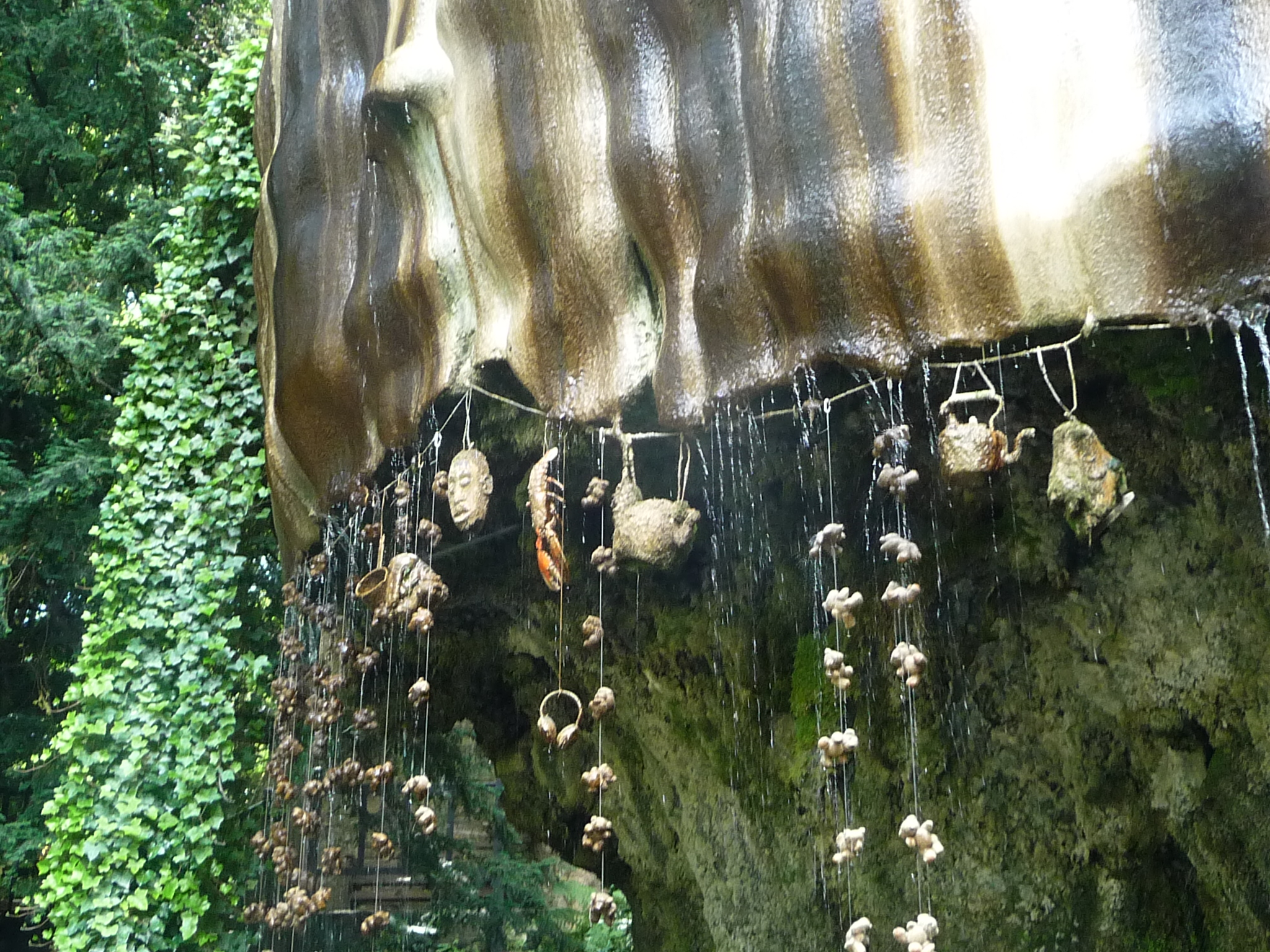
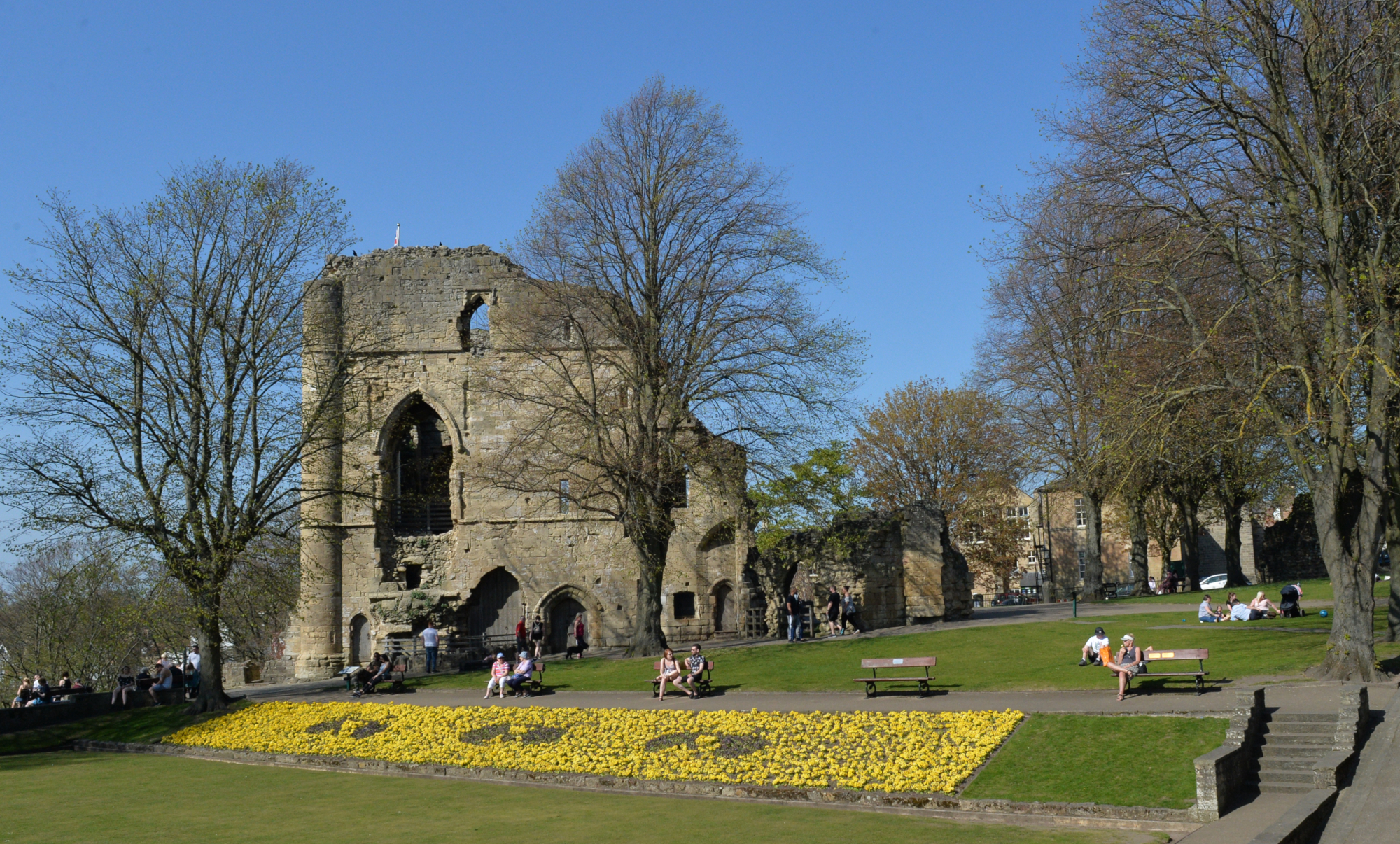
- River Nidd The Viaduct Market Cross Mother Shipton's Cave Castle

- Location within North Yorkshire
- Population: 15,441 (2011 census)
- OS grid reference: SE350570
  - London: 186 mi (299 km) SE
- Unitary authority: North Yorkshire
- Ceremonial county: North Yorkshire
- Region: Yorkshire and the Humber
- Country: England
- Sovereign state: United Kingdom
- Post town: KNARESBOROUGH
- Postcode district: HG5
- Dialling code: 01423
- Police: North Yorkshire
- Fire: North Yorkshire
- Ambulance: Yorkshire
- UK Parliament: Harrogate and Knaresborough
- Website: www.knaresboroughtowncouncil.gov.uk

Knaresborough (/ˈnɛərzbərə/ NAIRZ-bər-ə) is a market and spa town and civil parish on the River Nidd in North Yorkshire, England. It is three miles (five kilometres) east of Harrogate and was in the Borough of Harrogate until April 2023.

== History ==
The Knaresborough Hoard, the largest hoard of Romano-British copper-alloy vessels discovered to date in Britain, dates to the 4th century and indicates wealthy Roman presence in the area. It was probably discovered near Farnham near where two important Roman roads ran: Cade's Road on the eastern side and Dere Street to the west, a major route to York and Hadrian's Wall. There were a number of wealthy Roman villas in the area and the hoard may have come from one of these.

Knaresborough is mentioned in the Domesday Book of 1086 as Chenaresburg, meaning Cenheard's fortress. This obscure, male, Anglo-Saxon given name is sometimes written as Cěnheard or Cēnheard. It was located in the wapentake of Burghshire, renamed Claro Wapentake in the 12th century. Knaresborough Castle is Norman; around 1100, the town began to grow. It provided a market and attracted traders to service the castle. The parish church, St John's, was established around this time. The earliest identified Lord of Knaresborough is around 1115 when Serlo de Burgh held the Honour of Knaresborough from the King.

Hugh de Morville was granted the Honour of Knaresborough in 1158. He was constable of Knaresborough and leader of the group of four knights who murdered Archbishop Thomas Becket at Canterbury Cathedral on 29 December 1170. The four knights fled to Knaresborough and hid at the castle. Hugh de Morville forfeited the lands in 1173, not for his implication in the murder of Thomas Becket, but for "complicity in the rebellion of Henry the Young King", according to the Early Yorkshire Charters. The Honour of Knaresborough then passed to the Stuteville family. When the Stuteville line was broken with the death of Robert the 4th (son of Robert 3rd) in 1205, King John effectively took the Honour of Knaresborough for himself. The first Maundy Money was distributed in Knaresborough by King John on 15 April 1210. Knaresborough Forest, which extended far to the south of the town, is reputed to have been one of King John's favourite hunting grounds.

Although a market was first mentioned in 1206, the town was not granted a Royal Charter to hold a market until 1310, by Edward II. A market is still held every Wednesday in the market square. In Edward II's reign, the castle was occupied by rebels and the curtain walls were breached by a siege engine. Later, Scots invaders burned much of the town and the parish church. In 1328, as part of the marriage settlement, Queen Philippa was granted "the Castle, Town, Forest and Honour of Knaresborough" by Edward III and the parish church was restored. After her death in 1369, the Honour was granted by Edward to their younger son, John of Gaunt, the Duke of Lancaster and since then the castle has belonged to the Duchy of Lancaster. After the accession of Henry IV the castle lost much of its importance in national affairs, but remained a key site in regional administration for another century.

In the English Civil War, following the Battle of Marston Moor in 1644, the castle was besieged by Parliamentary forces. The castle eventually fell and in 1646 an order was made by Parliament for its destruction (but not carried out till 1648). The destruction was mainly done by citizens looting the stone. Many town centre buildings are built of castle stone.

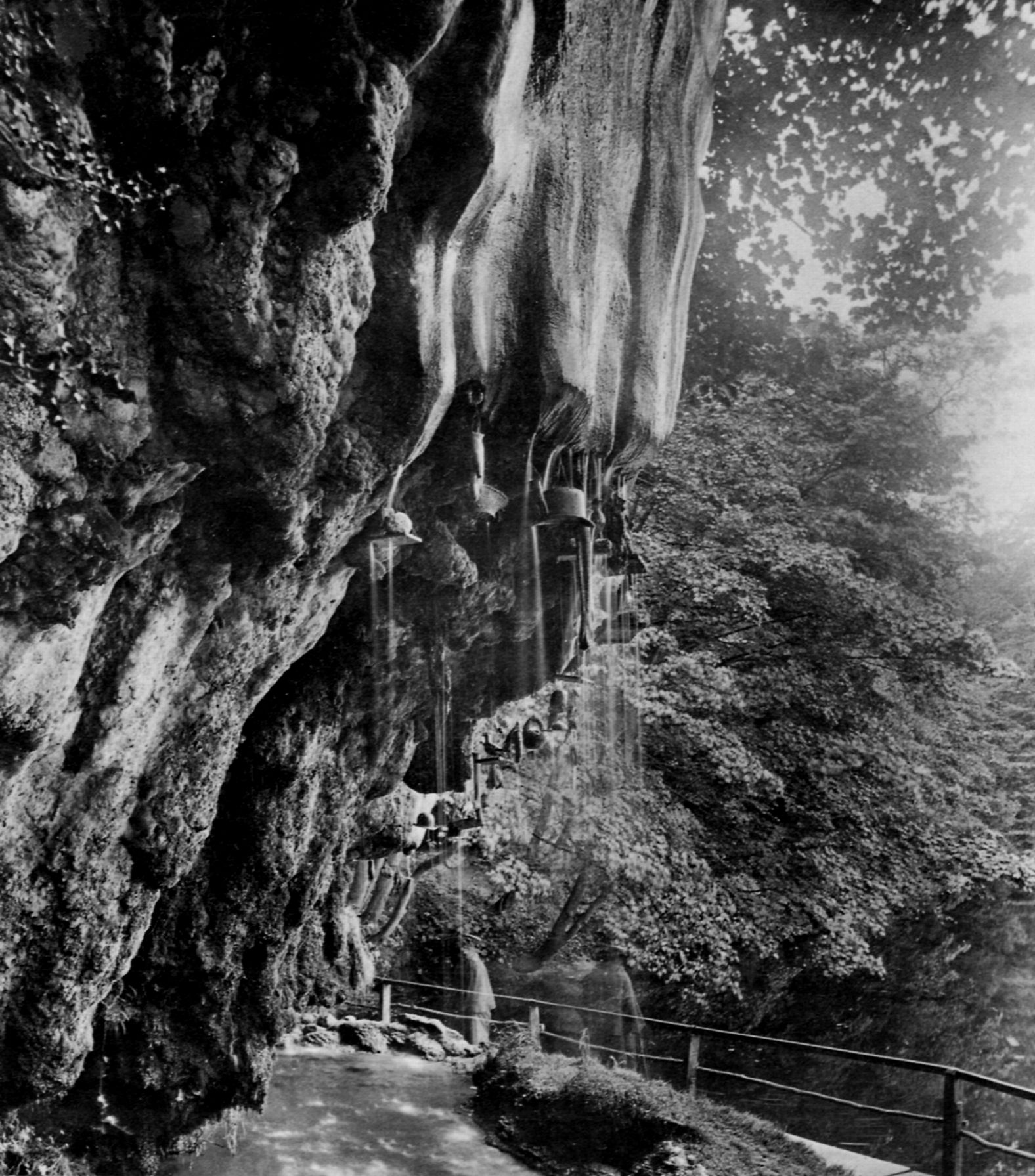
Knaresborough (period 1850–98) by Francis Frith

The railway age began in Knaresborough in 1848 with the opening of a railway station on Hay Park Lane; this was replaced with the current one three years later in 1851. The town had a railway line to Boroughbridge until it closed to passengers in 1950; it was dismantled in 1964.

Historically in the West Riding of Yorkshire, Knaresborough became part of North Yorkshire in 1974.

== Culture and community ==
Knaresborough House on the town's High Street houses Knaresborough Town Council and the Yorkshire Federation of Young Farmers' Clubs.

Knaresborough hosts an annual Bed Race, organised by the Knaresborough Lions Club. It is held on the second Saturday of June and was first held in 1966.

An annual, town centre arts summer festival, the Festival of Entertainment and Visual Arts, has been staged since 2001.

Since May 2019, a parkrun takes place every Saturday at Conyngham Hall.

Knaresbrough appeared in the first episode, opening election sequence of the ITV comedy series The New Statesman. Other exterior shots for the series were also filmed around the town. Knaresbrough was a principal location for the 2019 American television film A Very British Christmas.

The Frazer Theatre is close to Knaresbrough's High Street.

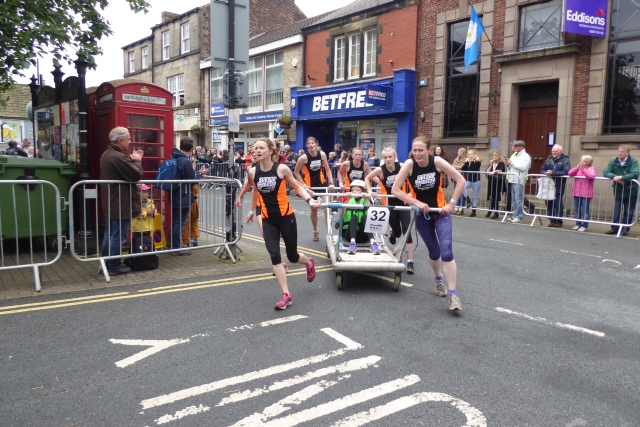
Bed Race in Knaresborough

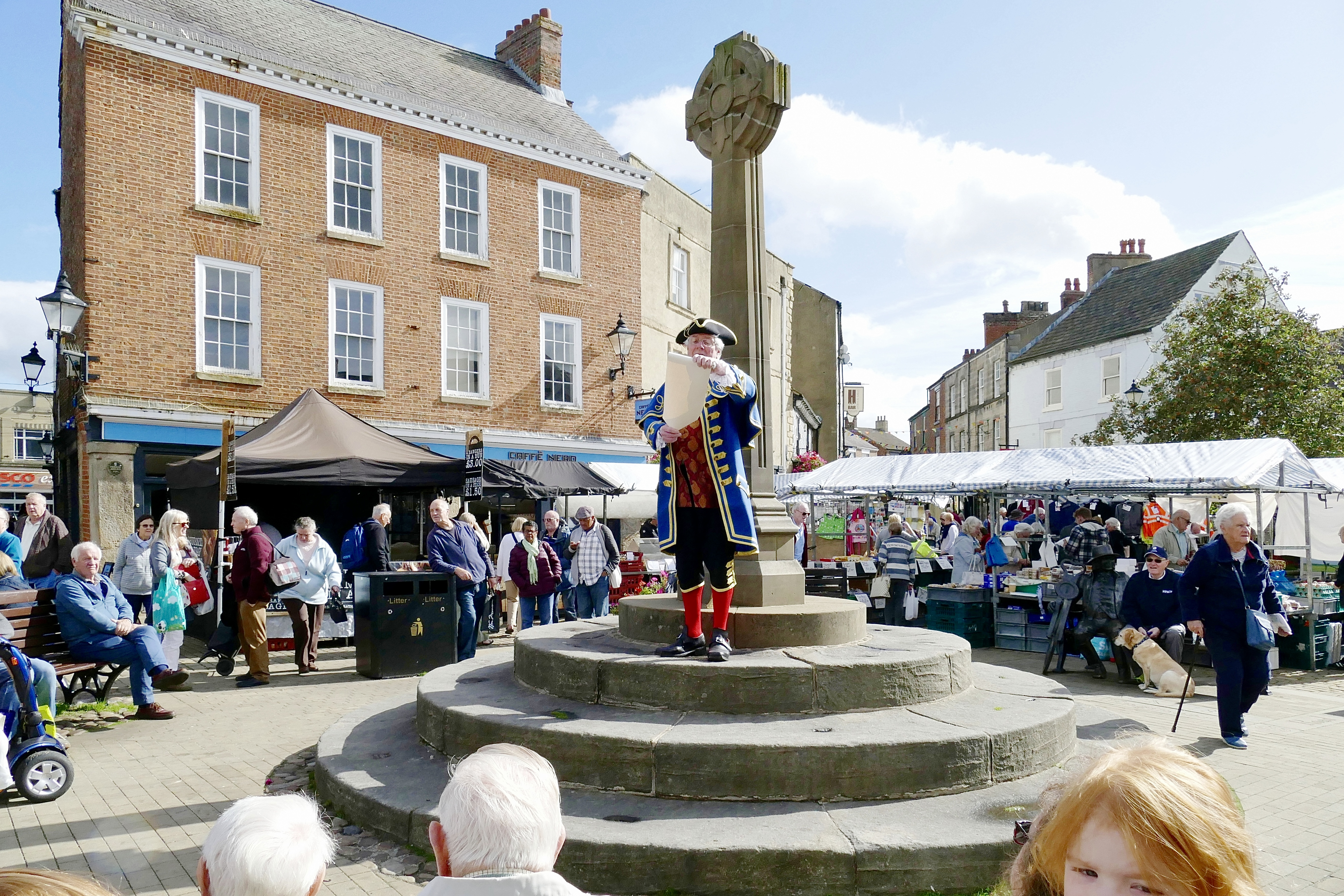
The town crier in the market place (2018)

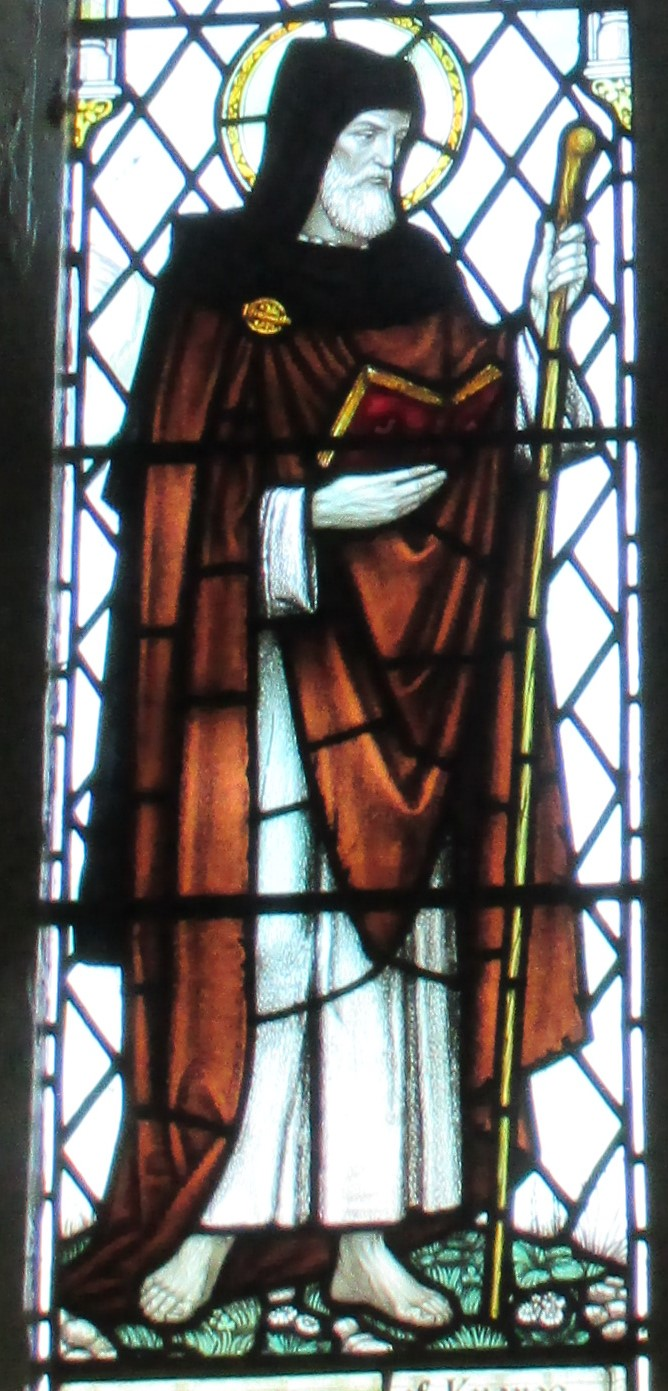
St. Robert of Knaresborough at Holy Trinity Church, Lower Beeding, West Sussex

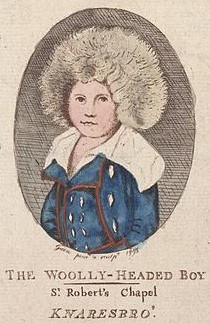
The Woolly-Headed Boy of Fort Montague

== Landmarks ==
Sights in the town include the remains of Knaresborough Castle, the Courthouse Museum in the castle grounds, Mother Shipton's Cave, The House in the Rock, St Robert's Cave (dating from the Middle Ages), and the railway viaduct over the River Nidd.

The House in the Rock, also known as Fort Montague, is a local Knaresborough curiosity. In the early 19th century, a strange child appeared in the Hill family. This child had very blonde, woolly hair, resembling the fleece of a sheep, and was known as the Woolly-Headed Boy of Fort Montague. He conducted visitors around the house, and was a great curiosity himself.

The Chapel of Our Lady of the Crag on Abbey Road is a Grade I listed shrine dedicated to the Virgin Mary. It was built in 1408 by John the Mason after his son, who had been presumed dead in a rockfall in a local quarry, was found alive, his escape being attributed to the mason's frequent prayers to Mary.

Knaresborough is the site of the oldest chemist shop in England, opened in 1720.

The principal areas of public open space are the Knaresborough Castle grounds, Horseshoe Field, the King George V Playing Field and Jacob Smith Park, a 30-acre (12-hectare) parkland on the edge of the town, bequeathed to Knaresborough by Miss Winifred Jacob Smith in 2003. Wildlife is protected in the former flooded quarry, Hay-a-Park Gravel Pit.

Conyngham Hall is close to the town centre. Until the 1980s there was a small zoo in the grounds.

Near the castle are Bebra Gardens, formerly the Moat Gardens, renamed after Bebra, Knaresborough's twin town in Germany.

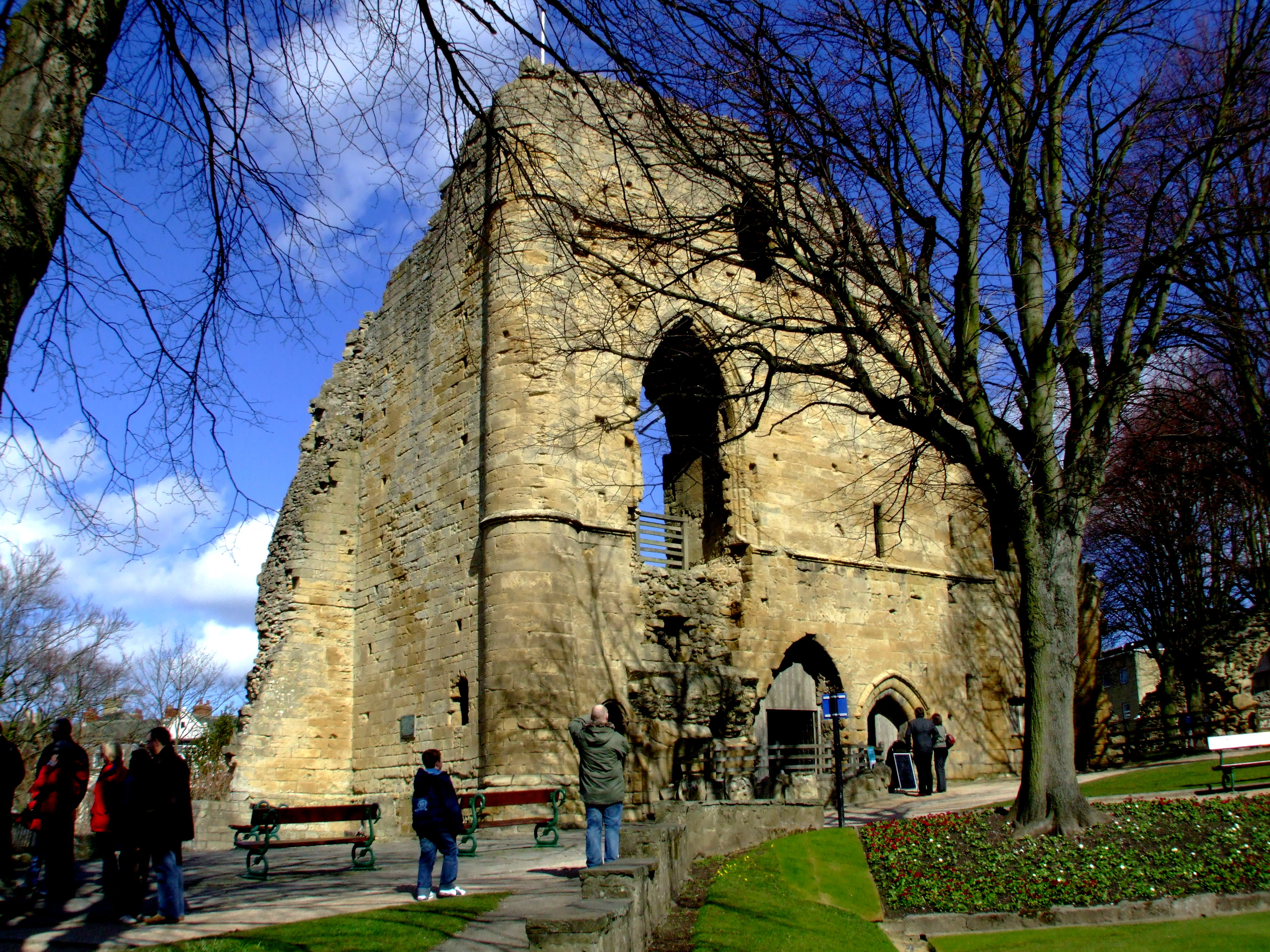
Knaresborough Castle

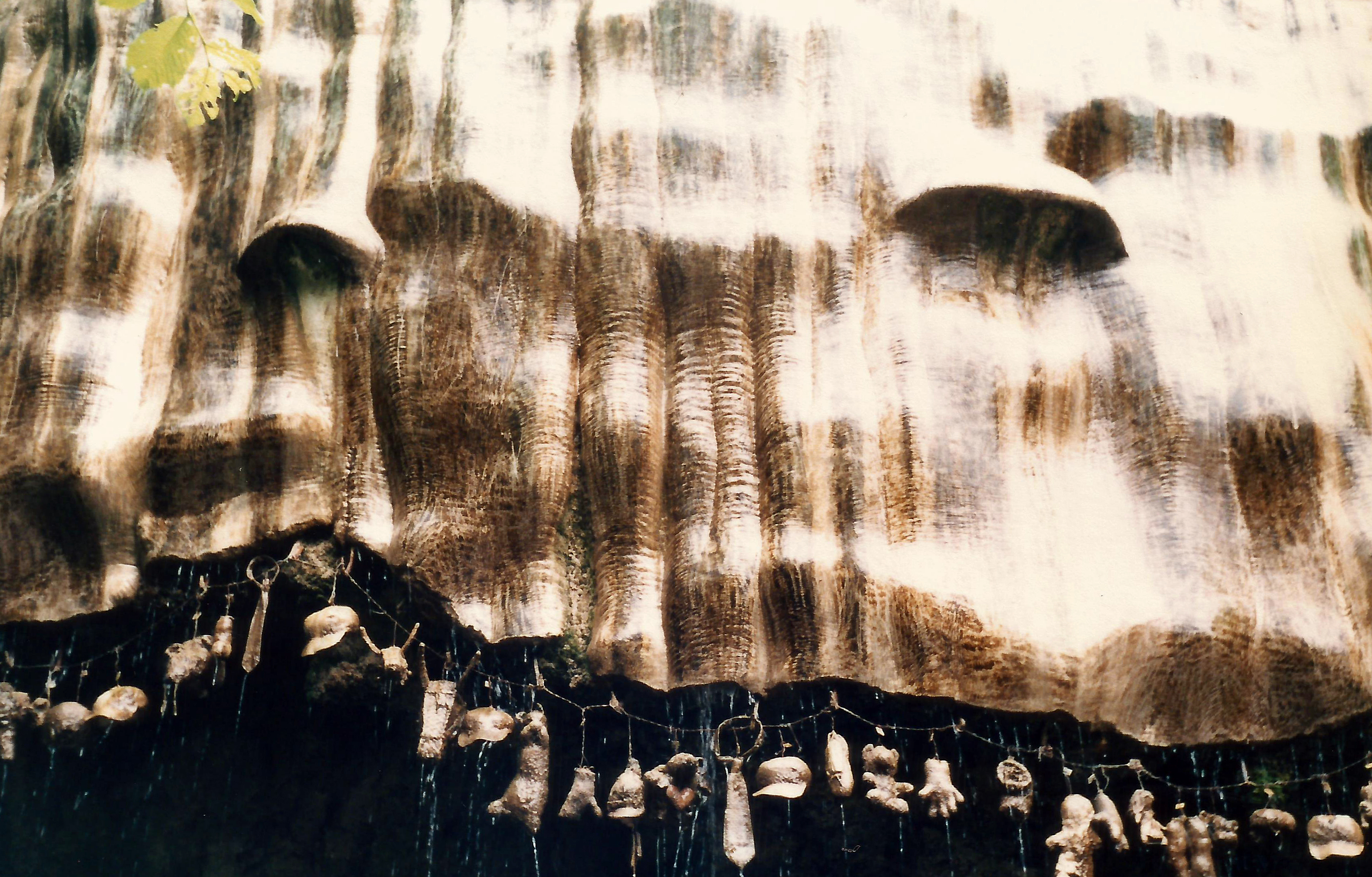
The Dropping Well in 1985, showing petrified toys

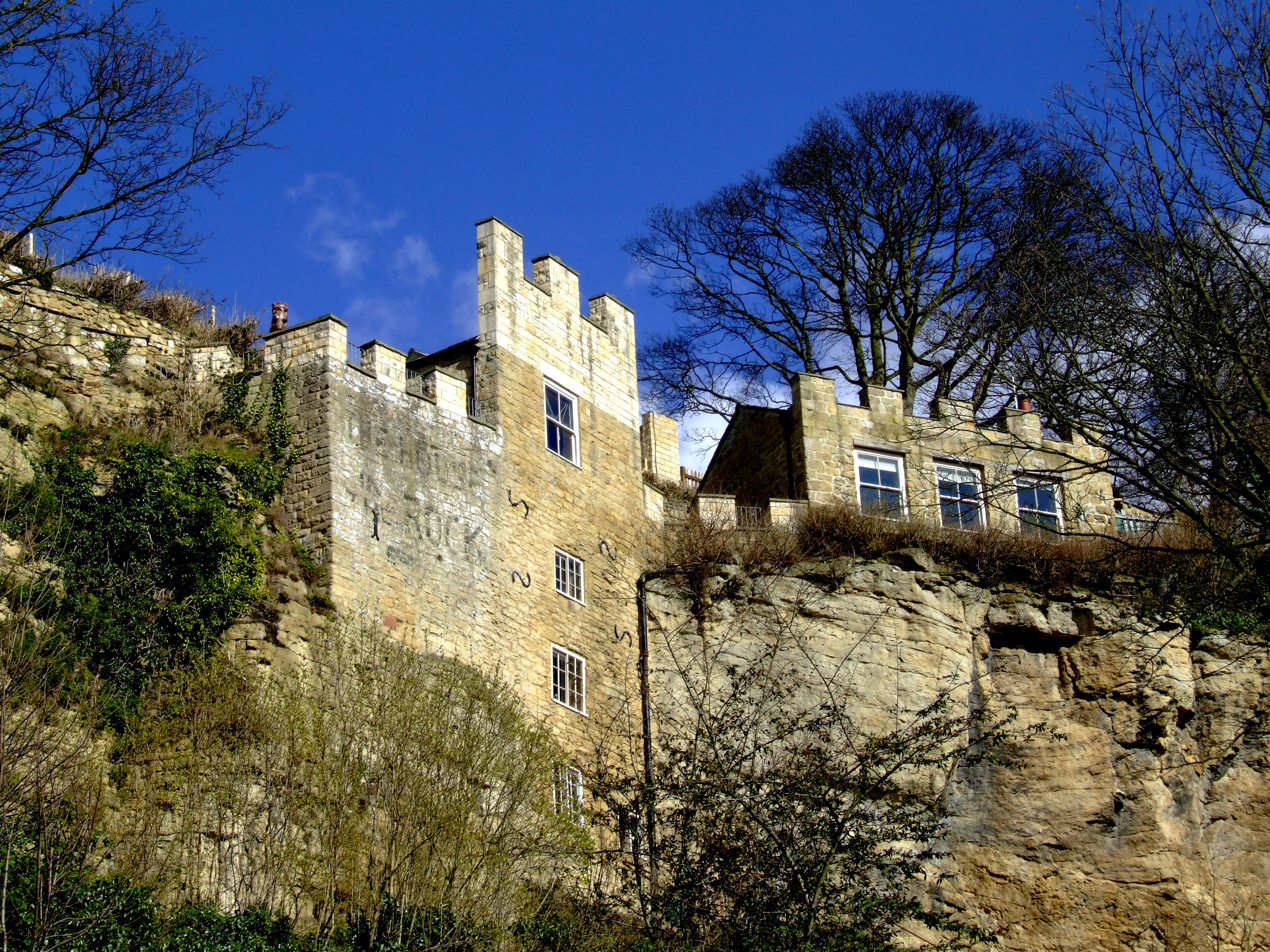
The House in the Rock

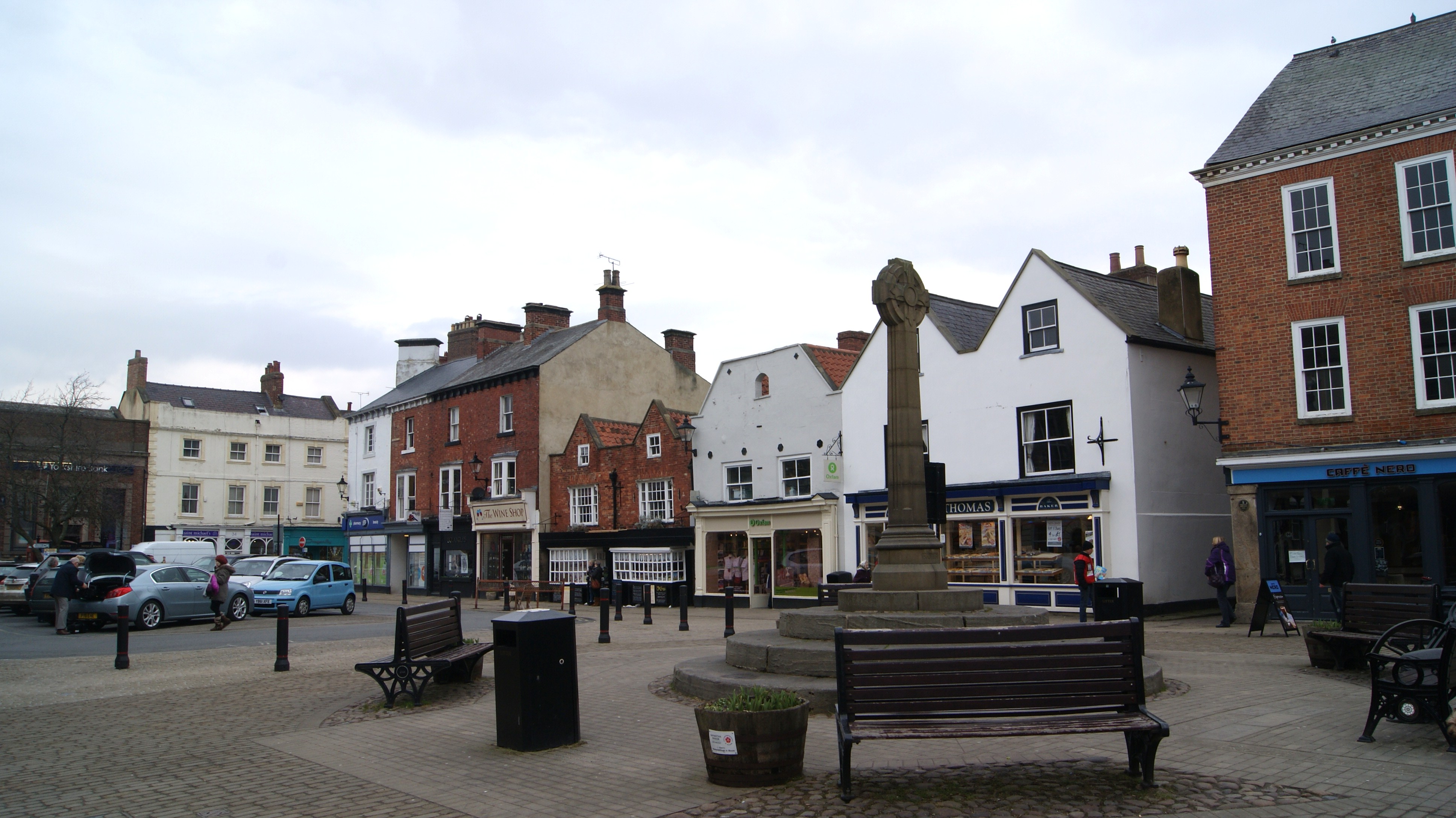
Knaresborough Market Place

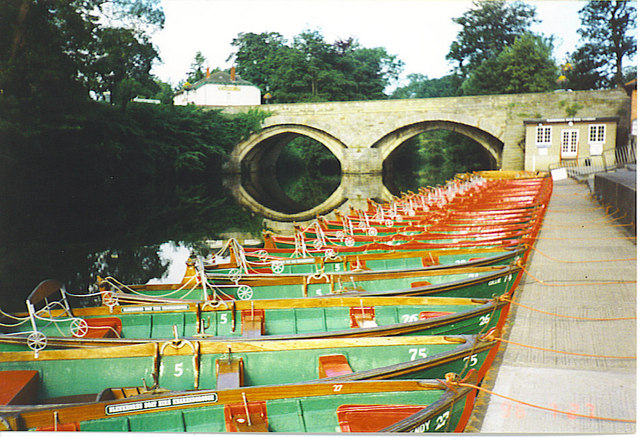
The rowing boats on the River Nidd are a tourist attraction

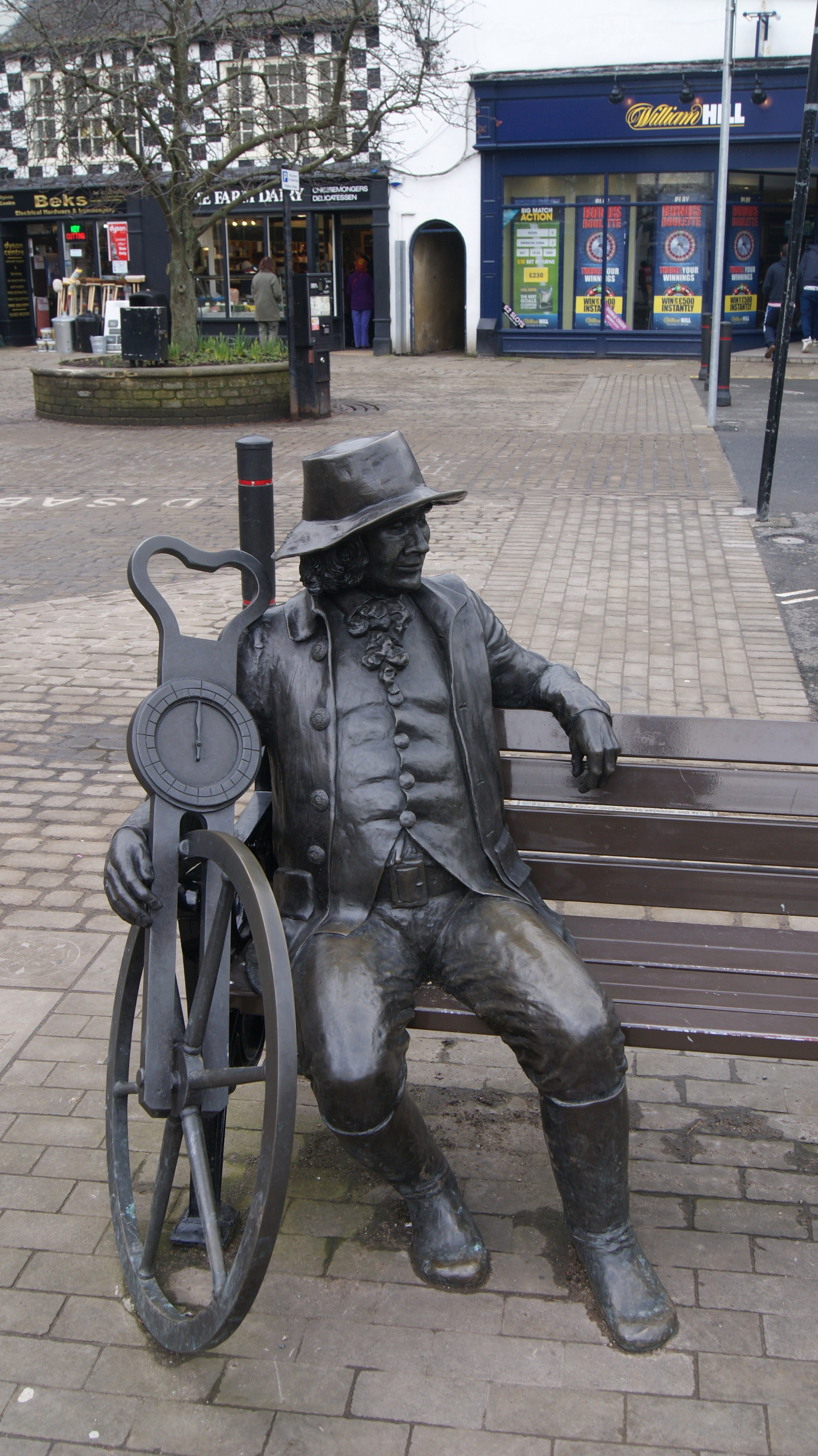
Statue of Blind Jack Metcalf in the market square

== Governance ==
Knaresborough Town Council
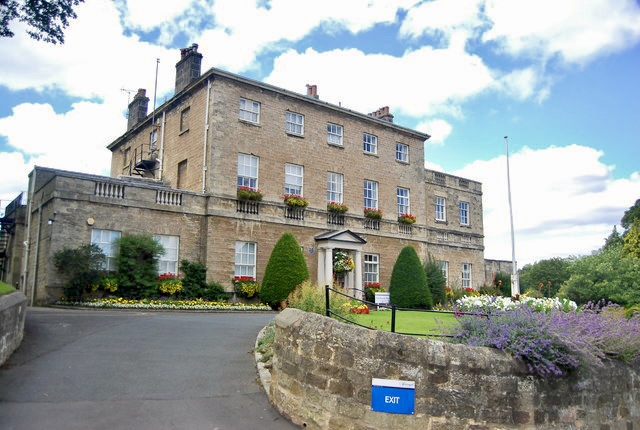

Type
- Type: Town Council

Meeting place
- Knaresborough House

Website
- www.knaresboroughtowncouncil.gov.uk

In the UK parliament the town is in the Harrogate and Knaresborough constituency. This is further divided for council purposes, the town spans four wards, "Knaresborough, Aspin and Calcutt", "Knaresborough Castle", "Knaresborough Eastfield", and "Knaresborough Scriven Park".

From 1974 to 2023 Knaresborough was administered as part of a two tier council system by Harrogate Borough Council, one of the seven district councils in North Yorkshire. The borough council was a non-metropolitan district, responsible for housing, planning, leisure and recreation, waste collection, environmental health and revenue collection. Above the Borough council was North Yorkshire County Council, which was a non-metropolitan county providing education, transport, highways, fire, waste disposal, social and library services.

In April 2023 both councils were replaced by North Yorkshire Council along with all district councils in North Yorkshire. The unitary authority now provides all the services previously provided separately by the two councils.

At the lowest level of governance, Knaresborough has a town council.

== Transport ==
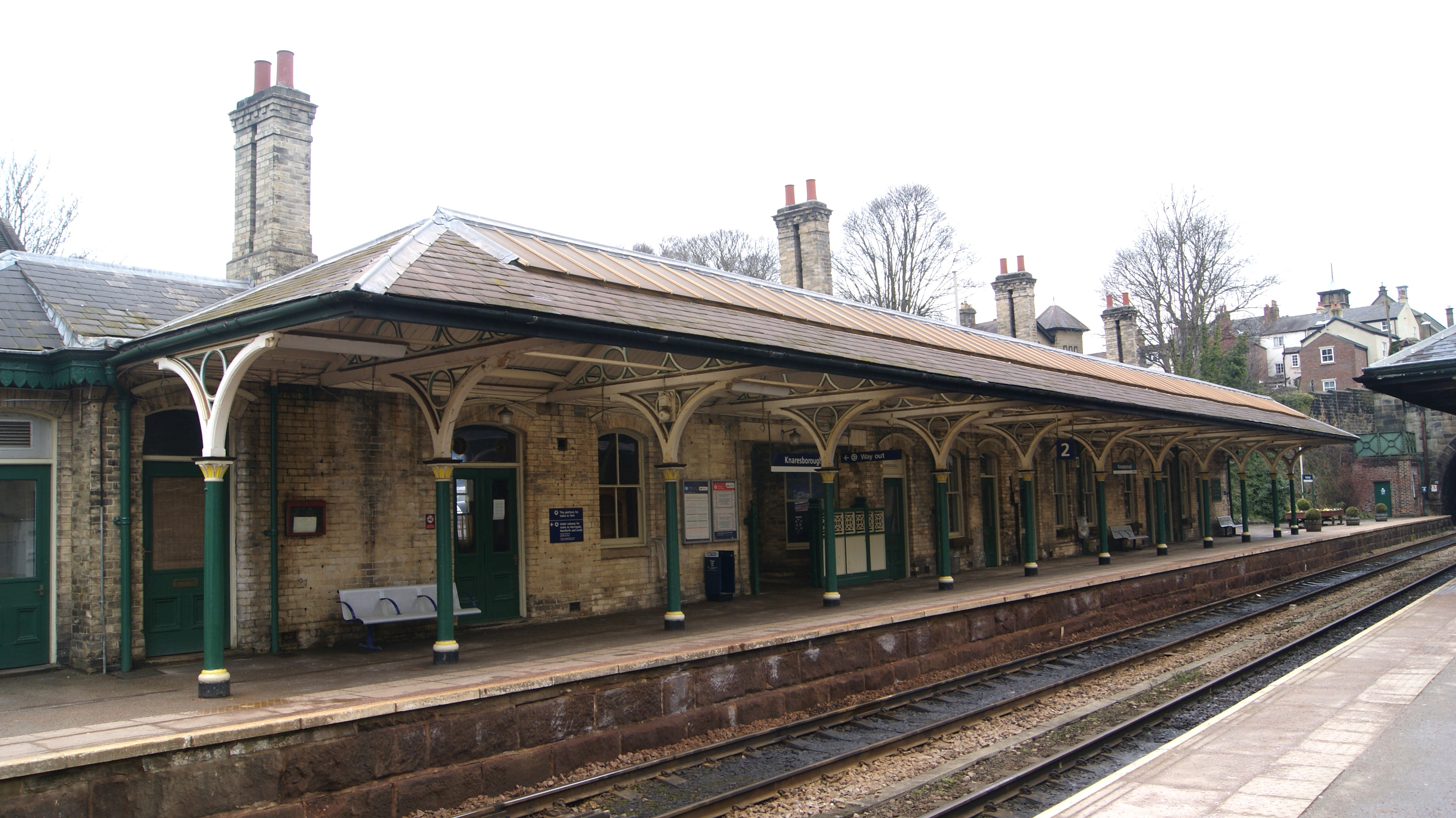
Knaresborough railway station

Knaresborough is served by Knaresborough railway station, on the Harrogate Line between Leeds and York. The town is four miles (six kilometres) from junction 47 of the A1(M) motorway (Great North Road), and on the A59 which links York and Wallasey. It is also served by Transdev, Go Ahead and 21 Transport who both run buses in the area that centre around Knaresborough bus station on the High Street. The closest airport is Leeds Bradford Airport with bus links from neighbouring Harrogate.

== Economy ==
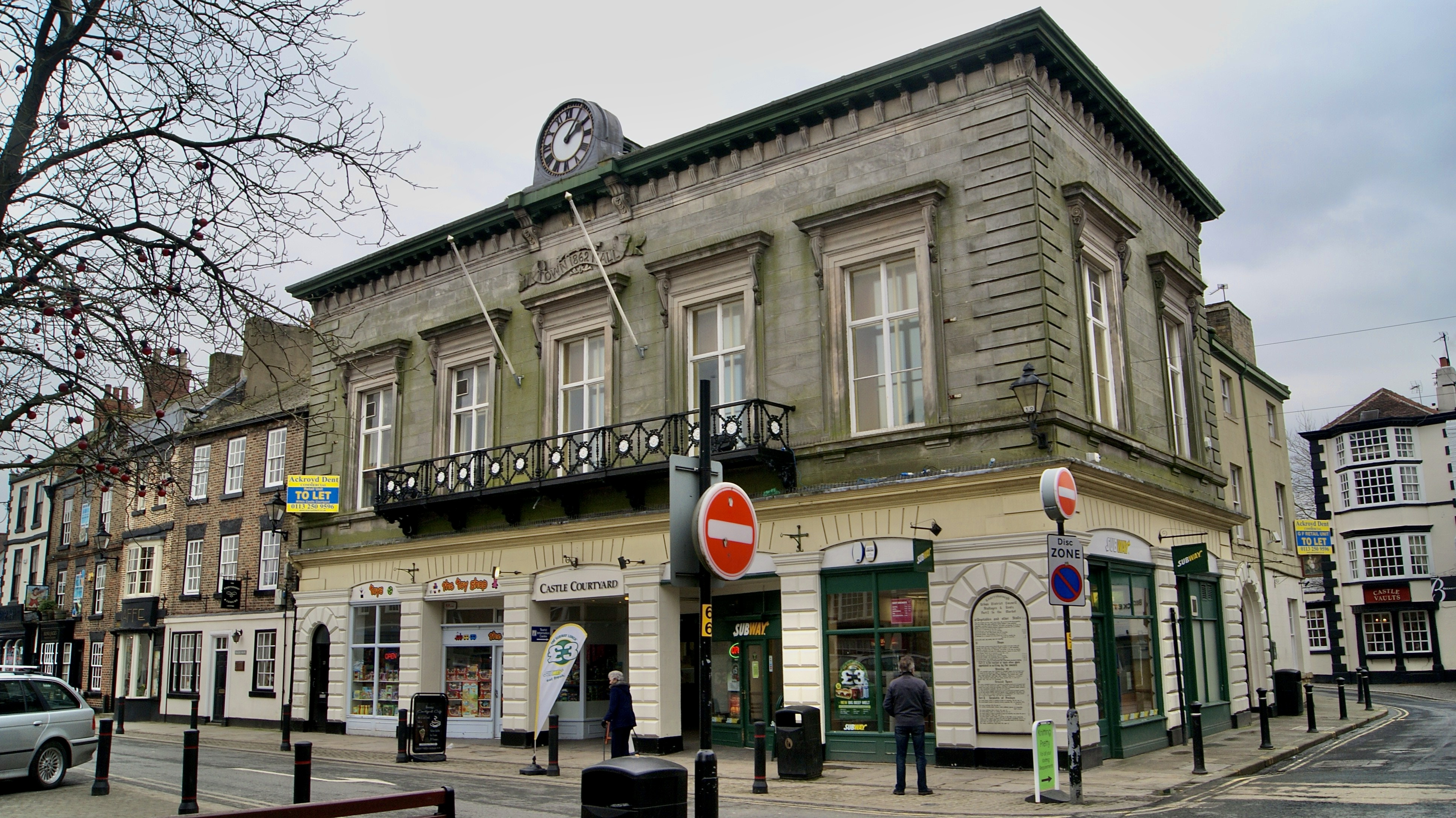
The Old Town Hall was converted into the Castle Courtyard shopping centre in the late 20th century

Knaresborough is mostly a commuter town but it also serves as a local centre for the surrounding rural villages. The town has a small tourism industry and service sector. There is a small industrial estate on Manse Lane in the east of the town. Knaresborough has a local weekly newspaper; the Knaresborough Post, although it borrows content heavily from neighbouring publications. Flying Colours Flagmakers, who hold a Royal Warrant to supply flags to the Royal Household, are based in Knaresborough.

The town has a large supermarket, Lidl, which is located on the site of a former Co-Op store in Chain Lane, as well as smaller supermarkets in the town centre. The St James retail park on the outskirts of the town, off Wetherby Road, has retail chain units. The town has fifteen public houses, a wine bar, two working men's clubs and several restaurants. There are a number of national retailers with branches in the town centre, mostly around the High Street, Market Place and Castle Courtyard (a shopping arcade in the old Town Hall). The town has a public swimming pool.

== Media ==
Local news and television programmes are provided by BBC Yorkshire and BBC North East and Cumbria on BBC One & ITV Yorkshire and ITV Tyne Tees on ITV1. Television signals can be received from either Emley Moor or Bilsdale TV transmitters.

The town's local radio stations are BBC Radio York, Greatest Hits Radio Yorkshire, Heart Yorkshire and 'Your Harrogate' which broadcast from Harrogate.

Local newspapers that serve the town are Knaresborough Post and The Press.

== Religion ==
The town has two Church of England churches, St John the Baptist, which is the largest church in Knaresborough, and Holy Trinity; a Roman Catholic church, St Mary; and Methodist and United Reformed churches.

Knaresborough Primitive Methodist Chapel on High Street was built in the 1850s. The date of closure is not known; a plaque on the building states that it was built in 1851 but there is some debate about this. The chapel premises were used by a coat manufacturer for a good part of the 20th century. In 2001 the premises were converted into four flats.

Ecumenical services take place "on special occasions" at the shrine of Our Lady of the Crag (1408).

A plaque in Market Place, placed by the Knaresborough Civic Society, commemorates the 13-century synagogue to the rear. The plaque indicates that in the 13th century a Jewish community lived and worshipped in Knaresborough. The synagogue was situated at the exit to Synagogue Lane, the exact location of which is unknown. It is believed the Knaresborough Jewish community was dissolved in 1275, before people of the Jewish faith were expelled from England in 1290 on the orders of Edward 1.

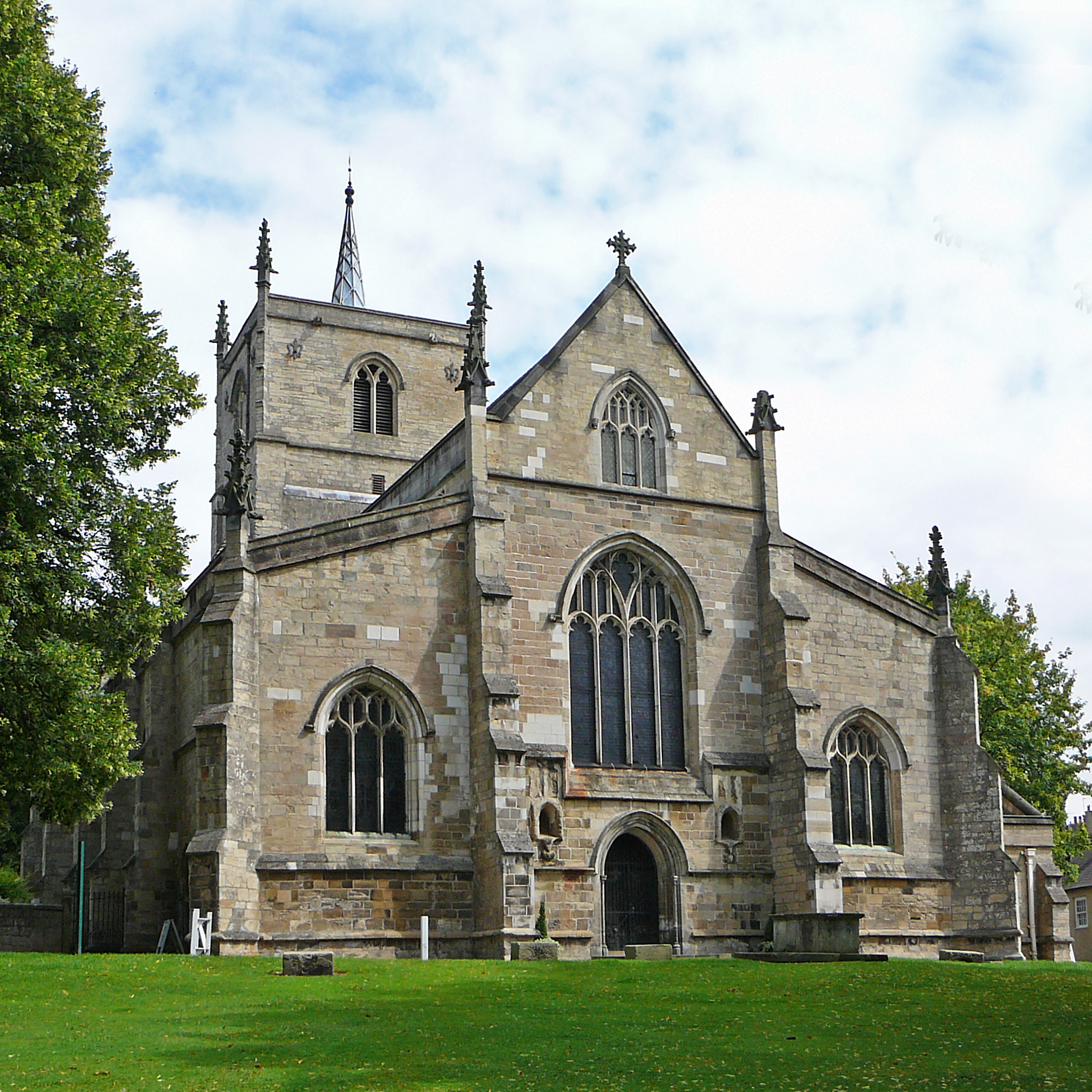
St John the Baptist Church

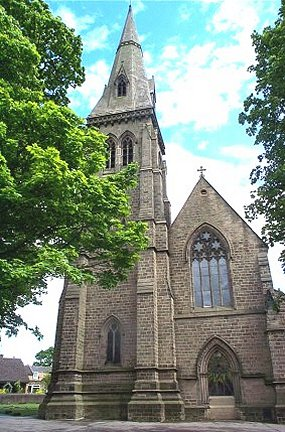
Holy Trinity Church

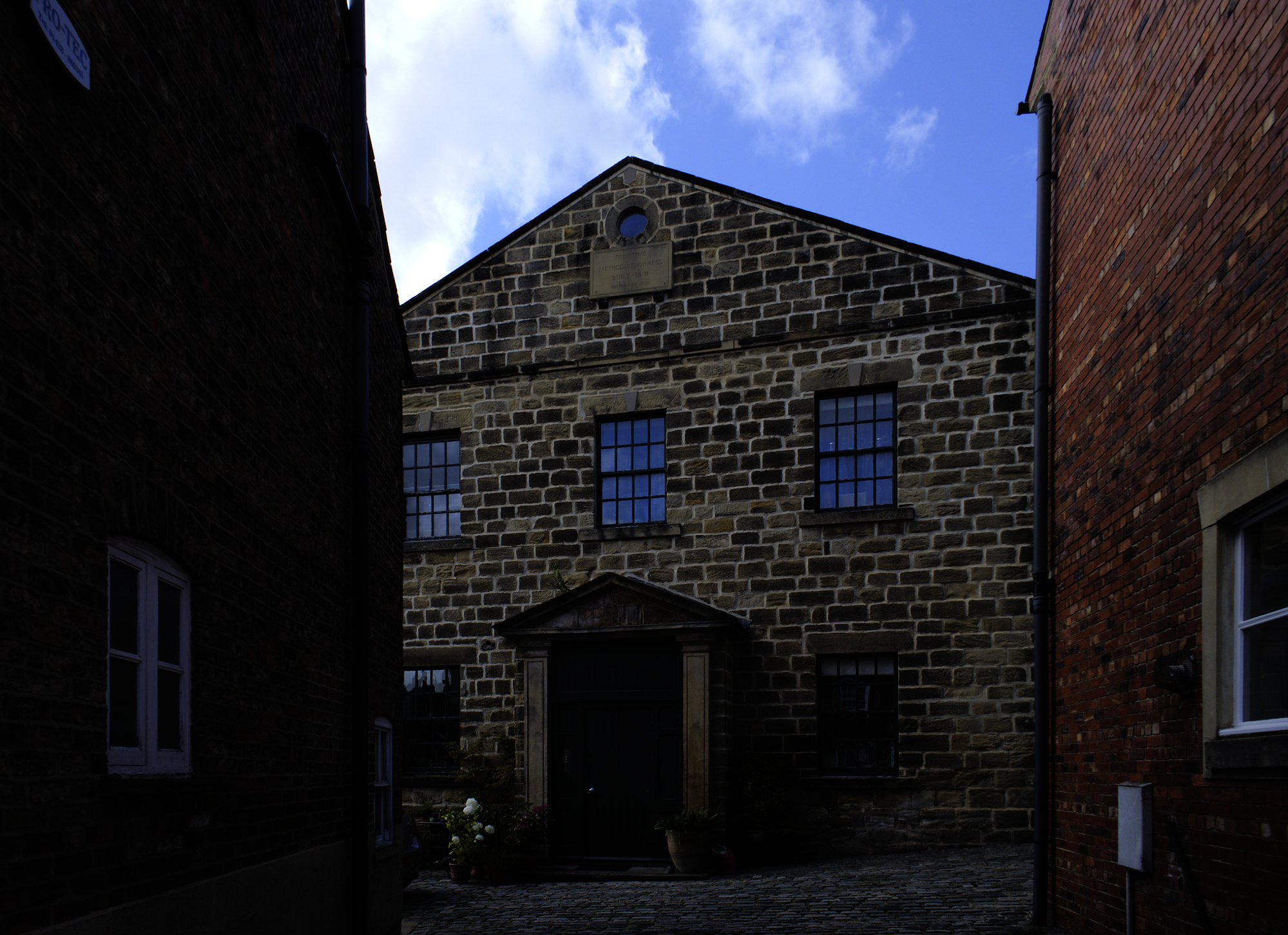
Primitive Methodist chapel

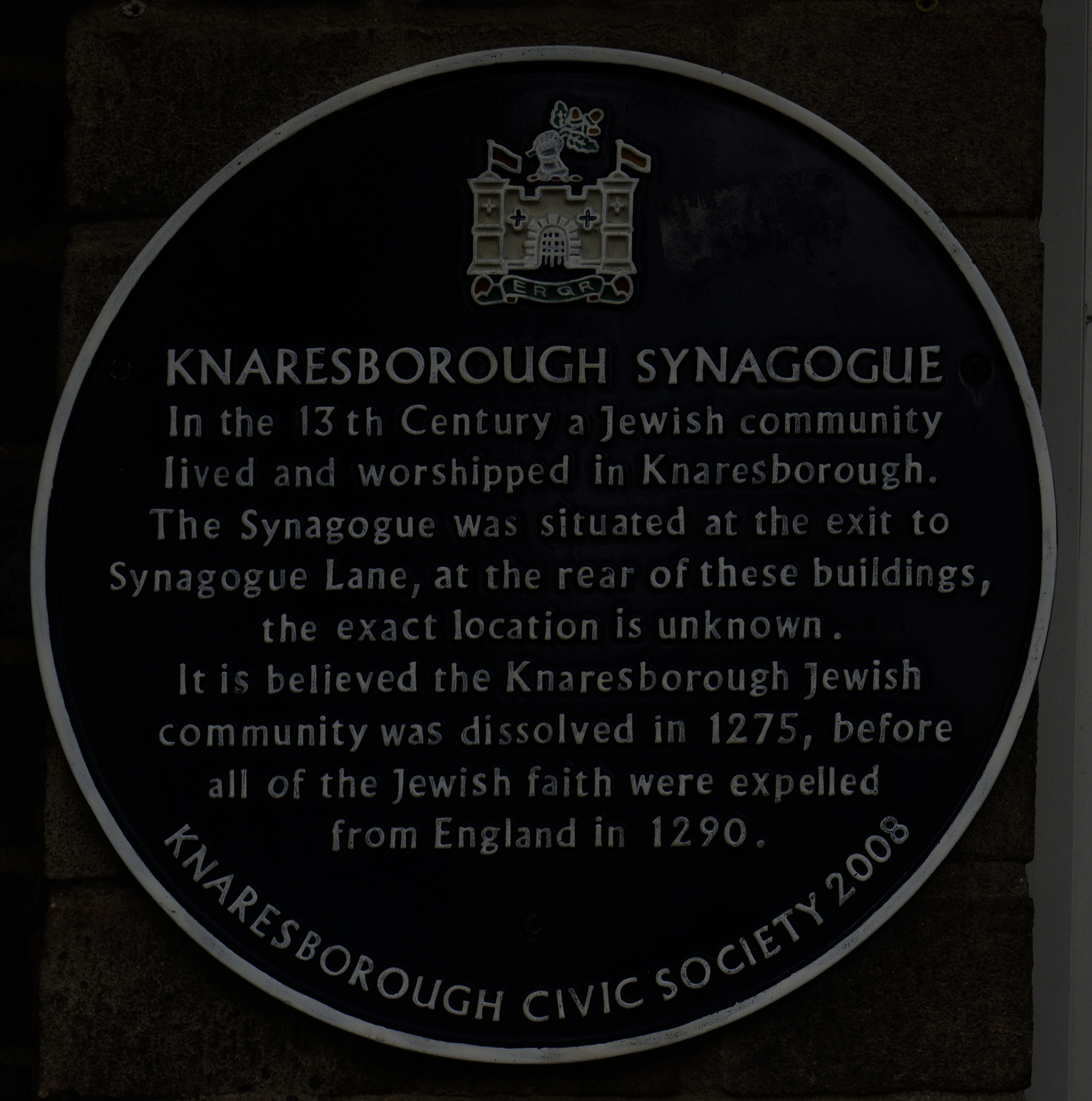
Knaresborough medieval synagogue plaque

== Education ==
Knaresborough has five primary schools and one secondary school; King James' School. There is a further education college in nearby Harrogate and universities in Leeds and York. The town has a two-storey library in the Market Place.

== Sport ==
Knaresborough Town F.C. is based at Manse Lane; they play in the Northern Counties East League Division 1. Youth football is catered for by Knaresborough Celtic with junior teams from Under 6s to Under 17s. Scotton Scorchers offer youth football for boys from the under 6s to under 12s and girls to under 17's. Knaresborough Town are developing youth football.

Knaresborough Rugby Club play in the Yorkshire Leagues. The club was formed in 1982 and play at their Hay-a-park ground which opened in 2014.

The town has two cricket clubs. Knaresborough Forest Cricket Club were Nidderdale League Division 3 winners in 2005, afterwards promoted from Division 2 as runners-up in the following season. Knaresborough Cricket Club have a ground on Aspin Lane, where adult teams play in the Airedale & Wharfedale Senior Cricket League and junior teams play in the Nidderdale Junior Cricket League.

On 6 July 2014, Stage 2 of the 2014 Tour de France from York to Sheffield, passed through the town.

== Notable people ==
- William de Vesci (c. 1125–1184), Anglo-Norman feudal lord, born at Knaresborough Castle
- St. Robert (c. 1160–1218), 12th-century hermit whose cave is near the River Nidd
- Ursula Southeil (c. 1488–1561), known as Mother Shipton, a medieval seer, may have been born in a cave south of the town.
- Robert Byerley (1660–1714), soldier and politician, lived at Goldsborough Hall
- Eugene Aram (1704–1759), scholar and murderer lived here.
- John Metcalf (1717–1810), known as "Blind Jack", lost his sight in childhood; a violin player, local guide, bridgebuilder and roadmaker.
- John Walton (1784–1862), entomologist
- William Hargrove (1788–1862), historian of York, owner of the York Herald
- John Smith (c. 1795–1870), banker and vegetarianism activist
- Richard Popplewell Pullan (1825–1888), architect, discovered the Lion of Knidos.
- William Stubbs (1825–1901), English historian and Anglican bishop.
- Charles Farrar Forster (1848–1894), the first vicar of Beckwithshaw Church.
- John Farrah (1849--1907), grocer, confectioner, biologist and meteorologist
- Squadron Leader James Harry Lacey (1917–1989), Second World War RAF fighter pilot, attended school in Knaresborough.
- Robert Aagaard (1932–2001), local furniture maker, founded the youth movement Cathedral Camps
- Gorden Kaye (1941–2017), actor and singer, best known for playing René Artois in the British comedy series 'Allo 'Allo!.
- Grant Kirkhope (born 1962), musician and composer best known for his work with Rare, was raised here and attended King James's School.
- Tim Kellett (born 1964), trumpeter and keyboardist from Simply Red and Olive
- Bill Callahan (born 1966), American singer-songwriter and guitarist
- The Paul Mirfin Band (formed in 2015), a local folk rock band
- Paul Daniels (born 1938), celebrity magician and TV presenter, part-owner of Mother Shipton's Cave

=== Sport ===
- Jonathan Joy (1826–1889) first-class cricketer
- Francis Prentice (1912–1978), first-class cricketer who played 241 matches
- Darren Manning (born 1975), motor racing driver
- Dan Linfoot (born 1988), world champion motorcycle racer currently competing in the FIM Endurance World Championship for Yoshimura SERT Motul Suzuki. Previously competed in Grand Prix motorcycle racing and the British Superbike Championship
- Greg Minikin (born 1995), rugby league footballer with 173 caps

== See also ==
- Listed buildings in Knaresborough
