= Knaresborough Zoo =

Former zoo in North Yorkshire, England

Coordinates: 54°00′40″N 1°28′28″W

Knaresborough Zoo was a zoo located in the grounds of Conyngham Hall, Knaresborough, a small market town within the district of Harrogate, North Yorkshire. It opened on 29 July 1965 and closed on 13 January 1986.

== History ==
=== First owner - Edward Milborrow ===
Knaresborough Zoo was opened on 29 July 1965 by Edward Milborrow, a former pet shop owner and circus ringmaster. Edward Milborrow had two young daughters, Ella and Jane Milborrow who spent a lot of time on site with the animals, they appear in many of the old photographs that have been shared of the zoo, an article about Knaresborough Zoo by York Press has a photograph of both girls sat within a penguin enclosure.

When Knaresborough Zoo opened it held many varieties of animals including elephants, chimpanzees, bats, otters and exotic birds. One famous chimpanzee who lived at Knaresborough Zoo was named Enoch, this animal had appeared in the 1957 BBC television series The Silver Sword. Knaresborough Zoo was popular with both local residents and tourists visiting the town, in an archive article by the Harrogate Advertiser, the local newspaper of Knareborough at the time, states that within the first four days of opening the zoo attracted 4,000 people despite poor weather conditions.

In 1969 Milborrow left his role as zoo director to become a taxidermist, the Zoo was bought by Associated Pleasure Parks who owned Flamingo Park (now Flamingo Land).

=== Second owner - Nick Nyoka ===
After the departure of Milborrow, Knaresborough Zoo was then taken over by Stockton-born Adrian Darley who lived with his wife Barbara and son Leo. Darley was better known by the pseudonym Nick Nyoka. The inspiration for the surname Nyoka comes from the Swahili language where it translates to the word 'snake'. Before coming to Knaresborough Zoo, Nyoka managed and ran animal shows at many zoos throughout England including Colchester Zoo, footage of his performances can be found online through various film archive sites. Nyoka ran Knaresborough Zoo up until the closure of the site in 1986.

When Nyoka took over Knaresborough Zoo he brought larger animals including lions, tigers, leopards, snakes and Himalayan brown bears. These animals were seen as being more dangerous than the animals that had previously been housed at Knaresborough Zoo during the time when it was owned by Milborrow. Two of the animals that Nick Nyoka kept at Knaresborough Zoo were listed in the Guinness Book of Records for their unbelievable sizes.

The most famous animal that lived at Knaresborough Zoo was Simba, a male African lion who weighed 826 lb (pounds) and had a shoulder height of 1.11 m (44 in). Before moving to Knaresborough Zoo he resided at Colchester Zoo. Residents of Knaresborough who lived in the town during the period of time Simba was at the zoo have recalled memories of hearing the lion roar early in the morning or late at night. Some sources claim Simba the lion was the lion that appeared in the film Cleopatra alongside Elizabeth Taylor in 1963. There are two different reports about what happened to the body of Simba after he died. A clip from the BBC television series Antiques Road Trip uploaded onto YouTube under the title 'SIMBA-WORLDS LARGEST LION' shows a stuffed lion behind glass casing alongside a photo of Nyoka which suggests he was preserved. However, an anonymous comment on a blog about Nyoka and Simba claims this isn't true and the lion's body is buried on the Knaresborough Zoo site.

Another famous animal that Knaresborough Zoo housed during Nyoka's time was a python named Cassius, this snake weighed 220 lb (pounds) and measured 27'4" in length.

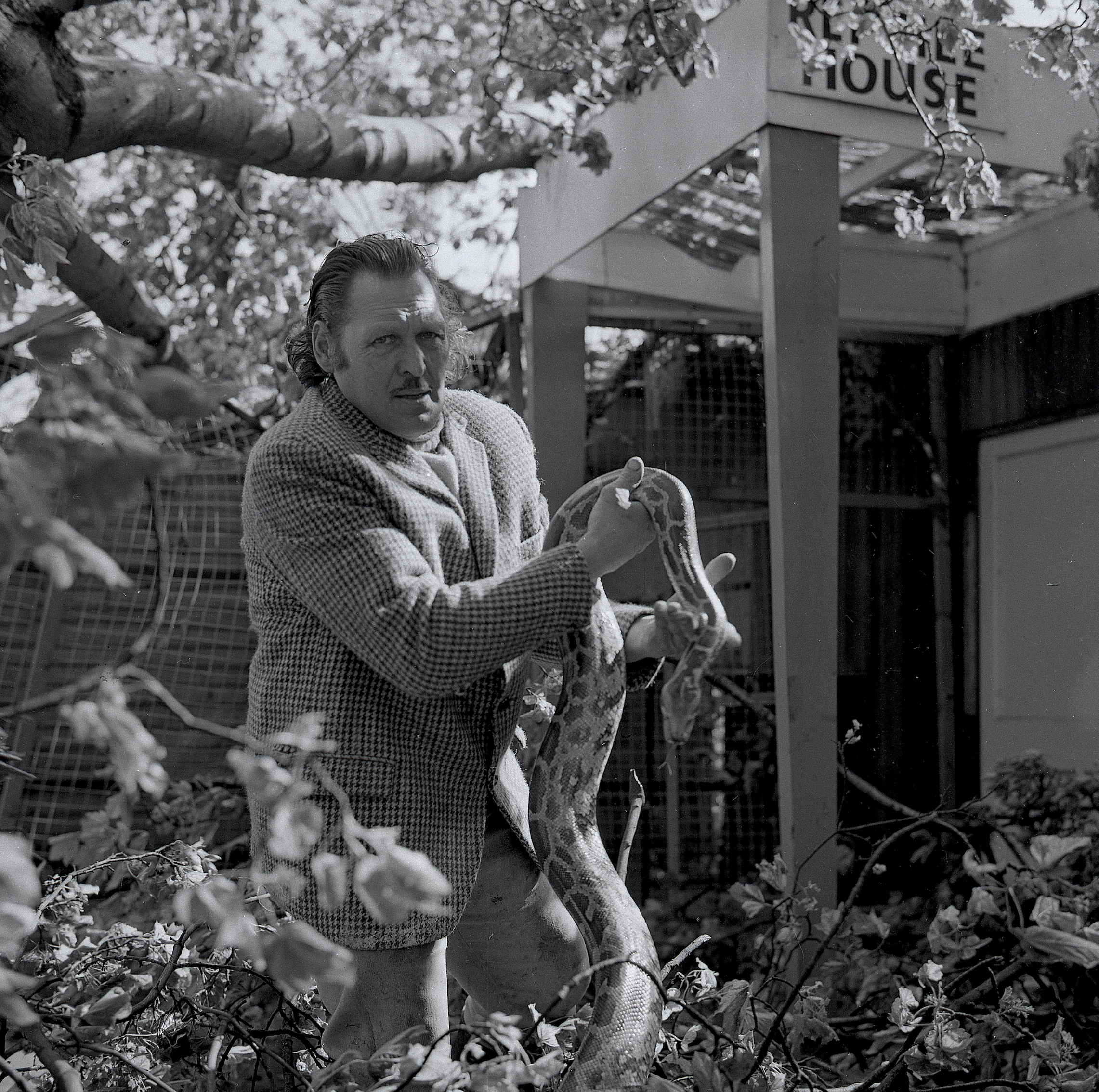
Nick Nyoka rescuing a Python at Knaresborough Zoo after a tree fell on the Reptile house 1978

Nyoka died in 1996 and an obituary for him is listed in Issue 54 of the magazine Tanzanian Affairs.

== Closure ==
Knaresborough Zoo closed on 13 January 1986 after facing a series of financial difficulties and also the refusal of a licence to operate by the local council. An inspectors’ report in the years before closure rated the zoo as "totally inadequate", points of criticism in the report were the standard of the animal enclosures and the level of hygiene in the zoo.

On 8 October 1986, nine months after the closure of Knaresborough Zoo the BBC broadcast a documentary called Animal Squad which showed the closure of the zoo and the attempts to rehome the 300 animals that lived there. Sid Jenkins, one of the RSPCA inspectors who was put in charge of dispersing the animals wrote up this experience in an autobiography titled Animals Have More Sense which was published by Fontana Press in 1988, two years after the documentary was shown.

Many of the animals were rehomed in Twycross Zoo, Leicestershire. Other animals were taken on by Suffolk Wildlife Park (now known as Africa Alive!). On 17 January 1986, four days after the closure of Knaresborough Zoo, Suffolk Wildlife Park put in an appeal to rehouse a lion named Satan, this appeal took 5 months to complete but was successful and on 20 June 1986 Satan arrived in Suffolk. The same park also rescued a pair of dingoes from Knaresborough Zoo when it closed.

Four mammals were not able to be rehomed. Two adult bears, a lion and a blind Puma. These animals were euthanised before their bodies were carried and placed in a skip. The local council disposed of them.

== Incidents ==
In June 1983 a Bengal tiger was shot dead by police after it escaped from its enclosure. The tiger had killed and mauled several other animals in the zoo. In a retirement statement from North Yorkshire Police, an officer named Mike Thompson was described to have taken part in this specific firearms incident.

Three python snakes worth approximately £950 were stolen from Knaresborough Zoo in 1983, Nick Nyoka's wife Barbara described the snakes as "bad-tempered" and warned that they had a tendency to bite, this led to fears for public safety. It is not public information about whether the pythons were returned to the zoo.

== Use of the site today ==
Even though the zoo closed in 1986 nothing was done with the location until the late 1990s when it was acquired by the Henshaw's charity, an organisation which supports individuals with sight loss and other disabilities. The Knaresborough Zoo buildings and enclosures were demolished and an Arts and Crafts Centre was built, this first opened to the general public on 25 April 1999 and is still used today as an educational facility and a place for local events to be held including live music nights. The crafts produced at Henshaw's still reference the zoo history of the location, for the 2017 Spring Flower Show in Harrogate the organisation created a design which included a sculpture of a lion named Simba. A blue plaque was placed on the outside of the Arts and Crafts Centre building by Knaresborough Civic Society in 2014 with a small paragraph about the zoo.

== In popular culture ==
On a building opposite Knaresborough bus station there is an animal themed mural which covers the first and second floor windows. It is titled Zoo and was painted by Julie Cope in 2007. The mural shows a zebra and a giraffe but it is unclear if these species were ever found at Knaresborough Zoo as there are no photographs or public records to evidence this. The artwork was funded by three different councils which were Knaresborough Town Council, Harrogate Borough Council and the Arts Council and is part of a series of windows that tell the history of Knaresborough town.
