= Holy Trinity Church, Knaresborough =

Anglican church in Knaresborough, North Yorkshire

Coordinates: 54°00′20″N 1°27′58″W

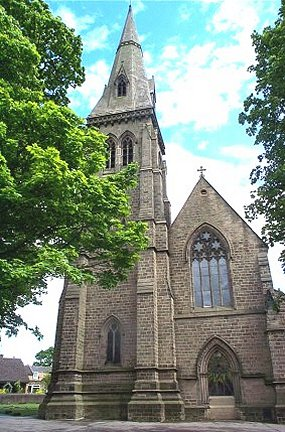
The church, in 2002

Holy Trinity Church is an Anglican church in Knaresborough, a town in North Yorkshire, in England.

The church was designed by J. Fawcett, in the 14th-century Gothic style. It was built between 1856 and 1863, on land donated by the Slingsby family, and could seat 612 worshippers. Painted glass was added to the east window, in memory of Prince Albert of Saxe-Coburg and Gotha. The church was grade II listed in 1952.

The church is built of gritstone with a Westmorland slate roof, and consists of a nave with a clerestory, north and south aisles, a north porch, a chancel with a north vestry, and a northwest tower. The tower has three stages, angle buttresses, two and three-light windows and bell openings, and a broach spire with lucarnes. It is 160 feet (49 m) high. Inside, there is a carved and gilded reredos, depicting the Apostles and symbols of the Passion of Christ. There are murals of saints and bishops at the east end, and a piscina and sedilia in the chancel.

== See also ==
- Listed buildings in Knaresborough
